= Ministry of Special Backward Classes Welfare (Maharashtra) =

Maharashtra government ministry responsible for Special Backward Classes Welfare

Ministry of Special Backward Classes Welfare Government of Maharashtra
- मंत्रालय विशेष मागासवर्गीय कल्याण विभाग, महाराष्ट्र शासन
- Seal of the state of Maharashtra

- Building of Administrative Headquarters of Mumbai

Ministry overview
- Jurisdiction: (India) Maharashtra
- Headquarters: Mantralay, Mumbai
- Minister responsible: Devendra Fadnavis, Chief Minister of Maharashtra
- Deputy Minister responsible: Vacant, TBD since 29 June 2022, Minister of State
- Ministry executive: (IAS)
- Parent department: Government of Maharashtra

The Ministry of Special Backward Classes Welfare is a Ministry of the Government of Maharashtra.

The Ministry is headed by a cabinet level Minister. Devendra Fadnavis is Current Chief Minister of Maharashtra and Minister of Special Backward Classes Welfare Government of Maharashtra.

== Head office ==
Minister of Special Backward Classes Welfare मंत्री विशेष मागासवर्गीय कल्याण विभाग
- Emblem of India

- Flag of India
- Incumbent; Devendra Fadnavis since 05 December 2024
- Ministry of Special Backward Classes Welfare (Maharashtra)
- Style: The Honourable
- Abbreviation: Cabinet Minister
- Member of: State Cabinet
- Reports to: Chief Minister, Maharashtra Legislature
- Seat: Mantralaya, Mumbai
- Appointer: Governor on the advice of the Chief Minister
- Term length: 5 years
- Precursor: Atul Save; (2022- 2023)
- Inaugural holder: D. S. Palaspagar (1960-1962)
- Formation: 1 May 1960
- Deputy: Vacant, TBD; since 29 June 2022

== Cabinet Ministers ==
No.	Portrait	Minister (Constituency)	Term of office			Political party	Ministry	Chief Minister
No.	Portrait	Minister (Constituency)	From	To	Period	Political party	Ministry	Chief Minister
Minister of Special Backward Classes Welfare - SBCW
01		B. G. Gadhe (MLA for Jalna North Constituency No. 101- Jalna District) (Legislative Assembly)	01 May 1960	07 March 1962	1 year, 310 days	Indian National Congress	Yashwantrao I	Yashwantrao Chavan
02		D. S. Palaspagar (MLC for Elected by MLAs Constituency No. 19 - Bhandara District) (Legislative Council)	08 March 1962	19 November 1962	256 days	Indian National Congress	Yashwantrao II	Yashwantrao Chavan
03		Keshavrao Sonawane (MLA for Latur Constituency No. 235- Latur District) (Legislative Assembly)	20 November 1962	24 November 1963	1 year, 4 days	Indian National Congress	Kannamwar l	Marotrao Kannamwar
04		P. K. Sawant (MLA for Chiplun Constituency No. 265- Ratnagiri District) (Legislative Assembly) (Interim Chief Minister)	25 November 1962	04 December 1963	9 days	Indian National Congress	Sawant	P. K. Sawant
05		Nirmala Raje Bhosale (MLA for Satara Constituency No. 268- Satara District) (Legislative Assembly)	05 December 1963	01 March 1967	3 years, 86 days	Indian National Congress	Vasantrao I	Vasantrao Naik
06		Gopalrao Bajirao Khedkar (MLA for Akot Constituency No. 28- Akola District) (Legislative Assembly)	01 March 1967	27 October 1969	2 years, 240 days	Indian National Congress	Vasantrao II	Vasantrao Naik
07		Nirmala Raje Bhosale (MLA for Satara Constituency No. 268- Satara District) (Legislative Assembly)	27 October 1969	13 March 1972	2 years, 138 days	Indian National Congress	Vasantrao II	Vasantrao Naik
08		Hari Govindrao Vartak (MLA for Bassein-Vasai Constituency No. 180- Palghar District (Legislative Assembly)	13 March 1972	04 April 1973	1 year, 32 days	Indian National Congress	Vasantrao III	Vasantrao Naik
09		Abdul Rahman Antulay (MLA for Shrivardhan Constituency No. 193- Raigad District) (Legislative Assembly)	04 April 1973	17 Match; 1974	347 days	Indian National Congress	Vasantrao III	Vasantrao Naik
10		M. B. Popat (MLA for Dhobitalao Constituency No. 160- Mumbai City District) (Legislative Assembly)	17 Match; 1974	21 February 1975	341 days	Indian National Congress	Vasantrao III	Vasantrao Naik
11		Vasantdada Patil (MLC for Elected by MLAs Constituency No. 20 - Sangli District) (Legislative Council)	21 February 1975	16 April 1977	2 years, 54 days	Indian National Congress	Shankarrao I	Shankarrao Chavan
12		Madhukar Dhanaji Chaudhari (MLA for Raver Constituency No. 11- Jalgaon District) (Legislative Assembly)	17 April 1977	07 March 1978	1 year, 324 days	Indian National Congress	Vasantdada I	Vasantdada Patil
13		Nashikrao Tirpude (MLA for Bhandara Constituency No. 61- Bhandara District) (Legislative Assembly) (Deputy Chief Minister)	07 March 1978	18 July 1978	133 days	Indian National Congress (Indira)	Vasantdada II	Vasantdada Patil
14		Bhausaheb Surve (MLA for Nagpur Central Constituency No. 55- Nagpur District) (Legislative Assembly)	18 July 1978	17 February 1980	1 year, 214 days	Indian Congress (Socialist)	Pawar I	Sharad Pawar
15		Jawaharlal Darda (MLC for Elected by MLAs Constituency No. 19 - Yavatmal District) (Legislative Council)	09 June 1980	21 January 1982	1 year, 226 days	Indian National Congress	Antulay	Abdul Rahman Antulay
16		Surupsingh Hirya Naik (MLA for Navapur Constituency No. 04- Nandurbar District) (Legislative Assembly)	21 January 1982	02 February 1983	1 year, 12 days	Indian National Congress	Bhosale	Babasaheb Bhosale
17		Shantaram Gholap (MLA for Murbad Constituency No. 139- Thane District) (Legislative Assembly)	07 February 1983	05 March 1985	2 years, 26 days	Indian National Congress	Vasantdada III	Vasantdada Patil
18		Balachandra Bhai Sawant (MLC for Elected by MLAs Constituency No. 09 - Ratnagiri District) (Legislative Council)	12 March 1985	03 June 1985	83 days	Indian National Congress	Vasantdada IV	Vasantdada Patil
19		Jawaharlal Darda (MLC for Elected by MLAs Constituency No. 19 - Yavatmal District) (Legislative Council)	03 June 1985	12 March 1986	282 days	Indian National Congress	Nilangekar	Shivajirao Patil Nilangekar
20		Sushilkumar Shinde (MLA for Solapur City Central Constituency No. 249- Solapur District) (Legislative Assembly)	12 March 1986	26 June 1988	2 years, 106 days	Indian National Congress	Shankarrao II	Shankarrao Chavan
21		Sudhakarrao Naik (MLA for Pusad Constituency No. 81- Yavatmal District) (Legislative Assembly)	26 June 1988	03 March 1990	1 year, 250 days	Indian National Congress	Pawar II	Sharad Pawar
22		Narendra Marutrao Kamble (MLC for Elected by Governor Nominated No. 10 - Mumbai City District) (Legislative Council)	03 March 1990	25 June 1991	1 year, 114 days	Indian National Congress	Pawar III	Sharad Pawar
23		Sushilkumar Shinde (MLA for Solapur City Central Constituency No. 249- Solapur District) (Legislative Assembly)	25 June 1991	22 February 1993	1 year, 242 days	Indian National Congress	Sudhakarrao	Sudhakarrao Naik
24		Chhagan Bhujbal (MLA for Mazgaon constituency No. 210- Mumbai Suburban District) (Legislative Assembly)	06 March 1993	14 March 1995	2 years, 8 days	Indian National Congress	Pawar IV	Sharad Pawar
25		Gopinath Munde (MLA for Renapur Constituency No. 236- Latur District) (Legislative Assembly) (Deputy Chief Minister)	14 March 1995	01 February 1999	3 years, 324 days	Bharatiya Janata Party	Joshi	Manohar Joshi
26		Babanrao Gholap (MLA for Deolali Constituency No. 126- Pune District) (Legislative Assembly)	01 February 1999	11 May 1999	99 days	Shiv Sena	Rane	Narayan Rane
27		Gopinath Munde (MLA for Renapur Constituency No. 236- Latur District) (Legislative Assembly) (Deputy Chief Minister)	11 May 1999	17 October 1999	159 days	Bharatiya Janata Party	Rane	Narayan Rane
28		Jaywantrao Awale (MLA for Vadgaon Maval Constituency No. 192- Pune District (Legislative Assembly)	19 October 1999	16 January 2003	3 years, 89 days	Indian National Congress	Deshmukh I	Vilasrao Deshmukh
29		Surupsingh Hirya Naik (MLA for Navapur Constituency No. 04- Nandurbar District) (Legislative Assembly)	18 January 2003	01 November 2004	1 year, 295 days	Indian National Congress	Sushilkumar	Sushilkumar Shinde
30		R. R. Patil (MLA for Tasgaon-Kavathe Mahankal Constituency No. 287- Sangli District) (Legislative Assembly) (Deputy Chief Minister)	01 November 2004	09 November 2004	8 days	Nationalist Congress Party	Deshmukh II	Vilasrao Deshmukh
31		Jayant Patil (MLA for Walva Constituency No. 283- Sangli District) (Legislative Assembly)	09 November 2004	01 December 2008	4 years, 22 days	Nationalist Congress Party	Deshmukh II	Vilasrao Deshmukh
32		Ganesh Naik (MLA for Belapur Constituency No. 151- Thane District) (Legislative Assembly)	08 December 2008	06 November 2009	333 days	Nationalist Congress Party	Ashok I	Ashok Chavan
33		Shivajirao Moghe (MLA for Arni Constituency No. 80- Yavatmal District) (Legislative Assembly)	07 November 2009	10 November 2010	1 year, 3 days	Indian National Congress	Ashok II	Ashok Chavan
34		Radhakrishna Vikhe Patil (MLA for Shirdi Constituency No. 218- Ahmednagar District) (Legislative Assembly)	11 November 2010	26 September 2014	3 years, 319 days	Indian National Congress	Prithviraj	Prithviraj Chavan
35		Devendra Fadnavis (MLA for Nagpur South West Constituency No. 52- Nagpur District) (Legislative Assembly) (Chief_Minister)	31 October 2014	04 June 2016	1 year, 217 days	Bharatiya Janata Party	Fadnavis I	Devendra Fadnavis
36		Chandrakant Patil (MLC for Pune Graduates Constituency No. 05 - Pune District) (Legislative Council)	04 June 2016	16 June 2019	3 years, 12 days	Bharatiya Janata Party	Fadnavis I	Devendra Fadnavis
37		Sanjay Kute (MLA for Jalgaon (Jamod) Constituency No. 27- Buldhana District (Legislative Assembly)	16 June 2019	12 November 2019	149 days	Bharatiya Janata Party	Fadnavis I	Devendra Fadnavis
38		Devendra Fadnavis (MLA for Nagpur South West Constituency No. 52- Nagpur District) (Legislative Assembly) (Chief_Minister); In Charge	23 November 2019	28 November 2019	5 days	Bharatiya Janata Party	Fadnavis II	Devendra Fadnavis
39		Nitin Raut (MLA for Nagpur North Constituency No. 57- Nagpur District) (Legislative Assembly)	28 November 2019	30 December 2019	32 days	Indian National Congress	Thackeray	Uddhav Thackeray
40		Vijay Namdevrao Wadettiwar (MLA for Bramhapuri Constituency No. 73- Chandrapur District) (Legislative Assembly)	30 December 2019	29 June 2022	2 years, 181 days	Indian National Congress	Thackeray	Uddhav Thackeray
41		Eknath Shinde (MLA for Kopri-Pachpakhadi Constituency No. 147- Thane District) (Legislative Assembly) (Chief Minister); In Charge	30 June 2022	14 August 2022	45 days	Shiv Sena (2022–present)	Eknath	Eknath Shinde
42		Atul Save (MLA for Aurangabad East Constituency No. 109- Chhatrapati Sambhaji Nagar District Also Previously Known Aurangabad District (Legislative Assembly)	14 August 2022	14 July 2023	334 days	Bharatiya Janata Party	Eknath	Eknath Shinde
43		Eknath Shinde (MLA for Kopri-Pachpakhadi Constituency No. 147- Thane District) (Legislative Assembly) (Chief Minister)	14 July 2023	26 November 2024	1 year, 135 days	Shiv Sena (2022–present)	Eknath	Eknath Shinde
44		Devendra Fadnavis (MLA for Nagpur South West Constituency No. 52- Nagpur District) (Legislative Assembly) (Chief_Minister); In Charge	05 December 2024	Incumbent	1 year, 297 days	Bharatiya Janata Party	Fadnavis III	Devendra Fadnavis

== Ministers of State ==
No.	Portrait	Deputy Minister (Constituency)	Term of office			Political party	Ministry	Minister	Chief Minister
No.	Portrait	Deputy Minister (Constituency)	From	To	Period	Political party	Ministry	Minister	Chief Minister
Deputy Minister of Special Backward Classes Welfare - SBCW
Vacant			23 November 2019	28 November 2019	5 days	NA	Fadnavis II	Devendra Fadnavis	Devendra Fadnavis
01		Omprakash Babarao Kadu (MLA for Achalpur Constituency No. 42- Amravati District) (Legislative Assembly)	30 December 2019	27 June 2022	2 years, 179 days	Prahar Janshakti Party Supported Party Shiv Sena	Thackeray	Vijay Namdevrao Wadettiwar	Uddhav Thackeray
02		Dattatray Vithoba Bharne (MLA for Indapur Constituency No. 200- Pune District (Legislative Assembly); Additional_Charge	27 June 2022	29 June 2022	2 days	Nationalist Congress Party	Thackeray	Vijay Namdevrao Wadettiwar	Uddhav Thackeray
Vacant			30 June 2022	26 November 2024	2 years, 149 days	NA	Eknath	Eknath Shinde (2022 - 2022); Atul Save (2023 – 2023); Eknath Shinde (2023 – 2024)	Eknath Shinde
Vacant			21 December 2024	incumbent	1 year, 281 days	NA	Fadnavis III	Devendra Fadnavis (2024 – Present)	Devendra Fadnavis
