= Ministry of Socially and Educationally Backward Classes (Maharashtra) =

Maharashtra government ministry

Ministry of Socially And Educationally Backward Classes Government of Maharashtra
- मंत्रालय सामाजिक आणि शैक्षणिकदृष्ट्या मागासवर्गीय विभाग, महाराष्ट्र शासन
- Seal of the state of Maharashtra

- Building of Administrative Headquarters of Mumbai

Ministry overview
- Jurisdiction: (India) Maharashtra
- Headquarters: Mantralay, Mumbai
- Minister responsible: Devendra Fadnavis, Chief Minister of Maharashtra and Minister of Socially And Educationally Backward Classes
- Deputy Minister responsible: Vacant, TBD since 29 June 2022, Minister of State
- Ministry executive: (IAS)
- Parent department: Government of Maharashtra

The Ministry of Socially And Educationally, Backward Classes - SEBC is a Ministry of the Government of Maharashtra. It was established following the Maharashtra State Reservation for Socially and Educationally Backward Classes Act, 2018.

The Ministry is headed by a cabinet level Minister. Devendra Fadnavis is Current Chief Minister of Maharashtra and Minister of Socially And Educationally Backward Classes Government of Maharashtra.

== Head office ==
Minister of Socially And Educationally Backward Classes मंत्री सामाजिक आणि शैक्षणिकदृष्ट्या मागासवर्गीय विभाग
- Emblem of India

- Flag of India
- Incumbent; Devendra Fadnavis; Chief Minister since 05 December 2024
- Ministry of Socially And Educationally Backward Classes (Maharashtra)
- Style: The Honourable
- Abbreviation: Cabinet Minister
- Member of: State Cabinet
- Reports to: Chief Minister, Maharashtra Legislature
- Seat: Mantralaya, Mumbai
- Appointer: Governor on the advice of the Chief Minister
- Term length: 5 years
- Precursor: Atul Save; (2022- 2023)
- Inaugural holder: Keshavrao Sonawane (1960-1962)
- Formation: 1 May 1960
- Deputy: Vacant, TBD; since 29 June 2022

== Cabinet Ministers ==
No.	Portrait	Minister (Constituency)	Term of office			Political party	Ministry	Chief Minister
No.	Portrait	Minister (Constituency)	From	To	Period	Political party	Ministry	Chief Minister
Minister of Socially And Educationally, Backward Classes - SEBC
01		T. R. Narawane (MLA for Kurla Constituency No. 174- Mumbai Suburban District) (Legislative Assembly)	01 May 1960	07 March 1962	1 year, 310 days	Indian National Congress	Yashwantrao I	Yashwantrao Chavan
02		Keshavrao Sonawane (MLA for Latur Constituency No. 235- Latur District) (Legislative Assembly)	08 March 1962	19 November 1962	256 days	Indian National Congress	Yashwantrao II	Yashwantrao Chavan
03		Nirmala Raje Bhosale (MLA for Satara Constituency No. 268- Satara District) (Legislative Assembly)	20 November 1962	24 November 1963	1 year, 4 days	Indian National Congress	Kannamwar l	Marotrao Kannamwar
04		P. K. Sawant (MLA for Chiplun Constituency No. 265- Ratnagiri District) (Legislative Assembly) (Interim Chief Minister)	25 November 1962	04 December 1963	9 days	Indian National Congress	Sawant	P. K. Sawant
05		Narendra Mahipati Tidke (MLA for Savner Constituency No. 49- Nagpur District) (Legislative Assembly)	05 December 1963	01 March 1967	3 years, 86 days	Indian National Congress	Vasantrao I	Vasantrao Naik
06		Pratibha Patil (MLA for Jalgaon City Constituency No. 13- Jalgaon District) (Legislative Assembly)	01 March 1967	27 October 1969	2 years, 240 days	Indian National Congress	Vasantrao II	Vasantrao Naik
07		D. S. Palaspagar (MLC for Elected by MLAs Constituency No. 19 - Bhandara District) (Legislative Council)	27 October 1969	13 March 1972	2 years, 138 days	Indian National Congress	Vasantrao II	Vasantrao Naik
08		Madhukar Dhanaji Chaudhari Chaudhari (MLA for Raver Constituency No. 11- Jalgaon District) (Legislative Assembly)	13 March 1972	04 April 1973	1 year, 32 days	Indian National Congress	Vasantrao III	Vasantrao Naik
09		Yashwantrao Mohite (MLA for Karad South Constituency No. 260- Satara District) (Legislative Assembly)	04 April 1973	17 Match; 1974	347 days	Indian National Congress	Vasantrao III	Vasantrao Naik
10		Narendra Mahipati Tidke (MLA for Savner Constituency No. 49- Nagpur District) (Legislative Assembly)	17 Match; 1974	21 February 1975	341 days	Indian National Congress	Vasantrao III	Vasantrao Naik
11		Pratibha Patil (MLA for Jalgaon City Constituency No. 13- Jalgaon District) (Legislative Assembly)	21 February 1975	16 April 1977	2 years, 54 days	Indian National Congress	Shankarrao I	Shankarrao Chavan
12		Sundarrao Solanke (MLA for Majalgaon Constituency No. 229- Beed District) (Legislative Assembly)	17 April 1977	07 March 1978	1 year, 324 days	Indian National Congress	Vasantdada I	Vasantdada Patil
13		Yashwantrao Mohite (MLA for Karad South Constituency No. 260- Satara District) (Legislative Assembly)	07 March 1978	18 July 1978	133 days	Indian National Congress	Vasantdada II	Vasantdada Patil
14		Bhausaheb Surve (MLA for Nagpur Central Constituency No. 55- Nagpur District) (Legislative Assembly)	18 July 1978	17 February 1980	1 year, 214 days	Indian Congress (Socialist)	Pawar I	Sharad Pawar
15		Baburao Kale (MLA for Ghansavangi Jalna Constituency No. 190- Jalna District) (Legislative Assembly)	09 June 1980	21 January 1982	1 year, 226 days	Indian National Congress	Antulay	Abdul Rahman Antulay
16		Surupsingh Hirya Naik (MLA for Navapur Constituency No. 04- Nandurbar District) (Legislative Assembly)	21 January 1982	02 February 1983	1 year, 12 days	Indian National Congress	Bhosale	Babasaheb Bhosale
17		Baliram Waman Hiray (MLA for Dabhadi Constituency No. 74- Nashik District) (Legislative Assembly)	07 February 1983	05 March 1985	2 years, 26 days	Indian National Congress	Vasantdada III	Vasantdada Patil
18		Surupsingh Hirya Naik (MLA for Navapur Constituency No. 04- Nandurbar District) (Legislative Assembly)	12 March 1985	03 June 1985	83 days	Indian National Congress	Vasantdada IV	Vasantdada Patil
19		Sudhakarrao Naik (MLA for Pusad Constituency No. 81- Yavatmal District) (Legislative Assembly)	03 June 1985	12 March 1986	282 days	Indian National Congress	Nilangekar	Shivajirao Patil Nilangekar
20		Vilasrao Deshmukh (MLA for Latur City Constituency No. 235- Latur District) (Legislative Assembly)	12 March 1986	26 June 1988	2 years, 106 days	Indian National Congress	Shankarrao II	Shankarrao Chavan
21		Sushilkumar Shinde (MLA for Solapur City Central Constituency No. 249- Solapur District) (Legislative Assembly)	26 June 1988	03 March 1990	1 year, 250 days	Indian National Congress	Pawar II	Sharad Pawar
22		Sudhakarrao Naik (MLA for Pusad Constituency No. 81- Yavatmal District) (Legislative Assembly)	03 March 1990	25 June 1991	1 year, 114 days	Indian National Congress	Pawar III	Sharad Pawar
23		Shivajirao Deshmukh (MLC for Elected by MLAs Constituency No. 18 - Sangli District) (Legislative Council)	25 June 1991	22 February 1993	1 year, 242 days	Indian National Congress	Sudhakarrao	Sudhakarrao Naik
24		Padamsinh Bajirao Patil (MLA for Osmanabad Constituency No. 242- Osmanabad District (Legislative Assembly)	06 March 1993	14 March 1995	2 years, 8 days	Indian National Congress	Pawar IV	Sharad Pawar
25		Daulatrao Aher (MLC for Elected by MLAs Constituency No. 21 - Nashik District) (Legislative Council)	14 March 1995	01 February 1999	3 years, 324 days	Bharatiya Janata Party	Joshi	Manohar Joshi
26		Haribhau Bagade (MLA for Aurangabad East Constituency No. 109- Chhatrapati Sambhaji Nagar District Also Previously Known Aurangabad District (Legislative Assembly)	01 February 1999	11 May 1999	99 days	Bharatiya Janata Party	Rane	Narayan Rane
27		Daulatrao Aher (MLC for Elected by MLAs Constituency No. 21 - Nashik District) (Legislative Council)	11 May 1999	17 October 1999	159 days	Bharatiya Janata Party	Rane	Narayan Rane
28		Padamsinh Bajirao Patil (MLA for Osmanabad Constituency No. 242- Osmanabad District (Legislative Assembly)	19 October 1999	16 January 2003	3 years, 89 days	Nationalist Congress Party	Deshmukh I	Vilasrao Deshmukh
29		Sushilkumar Shinde (MLA for Solapur South Constituency No. 251- Solapur District) (Legislative Assembly) (Chief Minister)	18 January 2003	01 November 2004	1 year, 295 days	Indian National Congress	Sushilkumar	Sushilkumar Shinde
30		R. R. Patil (MLA for Tasgaon-Kavathe Mahankal Constituency No. 287- Sangli District) (Legislative Assembly) (Deputy Chief Minister)	01 November 2004	09 November 2004	8 days	Nationalist Congress Party	Deshmukh II	Vilasrao Deshmukh
31		Vijaysinh Mohite-Patil (MLA for Malshiras Constituency No. 254- Solapur District) (Legislative Assembly)	09 November 2004	01 December 2008	4 years, 22 days	Nationalist Congress Party	Deshmukh II	Vilasrao Deshmukh
32		Vimal Mundada (MLA for Kaij Constituency No. 232- Beed District) (Legislative Assembly)	08 December 2008	06 November 2009	333 days	Nationalist Congress Party	Ashok I	Ashok Chavan
33		Rajendra Darda (MLA for Aurangabad East Constituency No. 109- Chhatrapati Sambhaji Nagar District Also Previously Known Aurangabad District (Legislative Assembly)	07 November 2009	10 November 2010	1 year, 3 days	Indian National Congress	Ashok II	Ashok Chavan
34		Patangrao Kadam (MLA for Palus-Kadegaon Constituency No. 285- Sangli District) (Legislative Assembly)	11 November 2010	26 September 2014	3 years, 319 days	Indian National Congress	Prithviraj	Prithviraj Chavan
35		Devendra Fadnavis (MLA for Nagpur South West Constituency No. 52- Nagpur District) (Legislative Assembly) (Chief_Minister)	31 October 2014	04 June 2016	1 year, 217 days	Bharatiya Janata Party	Fadnavis I	Devendra Fadnavis
36		Chandrakant Patil (MLC for Pune Graduates Constituency No. 05 - Pune District) (Legislative Council)	04 June 2016	16 June 2019	3 years, 12 days	Bharatiya Janata Party	Fadnavis I	Devendra Fadnavis
37		Devendra Fadnavis (MLA for Nagpur South West Constituency No. 52- Nagpur District) (Legislative Assembly) (Chief_Minister)	16 June 2019	12 November 2019	149 days	Bharatiya Janata Party	Fadnavis I	Devendra Fadnavis
38		Devendra Fadnavis (MLA for Nagpur South West Constituency No. 52- Nagpur District) (Legislative Assembly) (Chief_Minister); In Charge	23 November 2019	28 November 2019	5 days	Bharatiya Janata Party	Fadnavis II	Devendra Fadnavis
39		Nitin Raut (MLA for Nagpur North Constituency No. 57- Nagpur District) (Legislative Assembly)	28 November 2019	30 December 2019	32 days	Indian National Congress	Thackeray	Uddhav Thackeray
40		Vijay Namdevrao Wadettiwar (MLA for Bramhapuri Constituency No. 73- Chandrapur District) (Legislative Assembly)	30 December 2019	29 June 2022	2 years, 181 days	Indian National Congress	Thackeray	Uddhav Thackeray
41		Eknath Shinde (MLA for Kopri-Pachpakhadi Constituency No. 147- Thane District) (Legislative Assembly) (Chief Minister); In Charge	30 June 2022	14 August 2022	45 days	Shiv Sena (Shinde Group)	Eknath	Eknath Shinde
42		Atul Save (MLA for Aurangabad East Constituency No. 109- Chhatrapati Sambhaji Nagar District Also Previously Known Aurangabad District (Legislative Assembly)	14 August 2022	14 July 2023	334 days	Bharatiya Janata Party	Eknath	Eknath Shinde
43		Eknath Shinde (MLA for Kopri-Pachpakhadi Constituency No. 147- Thane District) (Legislative Assembly) (Chief Minister)	14 July 2023	26 November 2024	1 year, 135 days	Shiv Sena (2022–present)	Eknath	Eknath Shinde
44		Devendra Fadnavis (MLA for Nagpur South West Constituency No. 52- Nagpur District) (Legislative Assembly) (Chief_Minister); In Charge	05 December 2024	Incumbent	1 year, 335 days	Bharatiya Janata Party	Fadnavis III	Devendra Fadnavis

== Ministers of State ==
No.	Portrait	Deputy Minister (Constituency)	Term of office			Political party	Ministry	Minister	Chief Minister
No.	Portrait	Deputy Minister (Constituency)	From	To	Period	Political party	Ministry	Minister	Chief Minister
Deputy Minister of Socially and Educationally Backward Classes - SEBC
Vacant			23 November 2019	28 November 2019	5 days	NA	Fadnavis II	Devendra Fadnavis	Devendra Fadnavis
01		Omprakash Babarao Kadu (MLA for Achalpur Constituency No. 42- Amravati District) (Legislative Assembly)	30 December 2019	27 June 2022	2 years, 179 days	Prahar Janshakti Party Supported Party Shiv Sena	Thackeray	Vijay Namdevrao Wadettiwar	Uddhav Thackeray
02		Dattatray Vithoba Bharne (MLA for Indapur Constituency No. 200- Pune District (Legislative Assembly); Additional_Charge	27 June 2022	29 June 2022	2 days	Nationalist Congress Party	Thackeray	Vijay Namdevrao Wadettiwar	Uddhav Thackeray
Vacant			30 June 2022	26 November 2024	2 years, 149 days	NA	Eknath	Eknath Shinde (2022 - 2023); Atul Save (2023–2023); Eknath Shinde (2023–2024)	Eknath Shinde
Vacant			21 December 2024	incumbent	1 year, 319 days	NA	Fadnavis III	Devendra Fadnavis (2024 – Present)	Devendra Fadnavis
