= Ministry of Nomadic Tribes (Maharashtra) =

Maharashtra government ministry responsible for Nomadic Tribes

Ministry of Nomadic Tribes Government of Maharashtra
- Seal of the state of Maharashtra

- Building of Administrative Headquarters of Mumbai

Ministry overview
- Jurisdiction: (India) Maharashtra
- Headquarters: Mantralay, Mumbai
- Minister responsible: Devendra Fadnavis, Chief Minister of Maharashtra
- Deputy Minister responsible: Vacant, TBD since 29 June 2022, Minister of State
- Ministry executive: (IAS)
- Parent department: Government of Maharashtra

The Ministry of Nomadic Tribes, also named the Nomadic Tribes Development Corporation, Limited, is a ministry of the Government of Maharashtra. state.

The Ministry is headed by a cabinet-level Minister. Devendra Fadnavis is Current Chief Minister of Maharashtra and Minister of Nomadic Tribes Department Government of Maharashtra.

== Head office ==
Minister of Nomadic Tribes मंत्री भटक्या जमाती विभाग
- Emblem of India

- Flag of India
- Incumbent; Devendra Fadnavis since 05 December 2024
- Ministry of Nomadic Tribes (Maharashtra)
- Style: The Honourable
- Abbreviation: Cabinet Minister
- Member of: State Cabinet
- Reports to: Chief Minister, Maharashtra Legislature
- Seat: Mantralaya, Mumbai
- Appointer: Governor on the advice of the Chief Minister
- Term length: 5 years
- Precursor: Atul Save; (2022- 2023)
- Inaugural holder: D. S. Palaspagar (1960-1962)
- Formation: 1 May 1960
- Deputy: Vacant, TBD; since 29 June 2022

== Cabinet Ministers ==
No.	Portrait	Minister (Constituency)	Term of office			Political party	Ministry	Chief Minister
No.	Portrait	Minister (Constituency)	From	To	Period	Political party	Ministry	Chief Minister
Minister of Nomadic Tribesl Department
01		Balasaheb Shivram Bharde (MLA for Ahmednagar South Constituency No. 224- Ahmednagar District) (Legislative Assembly)	01 May 1960	07 March 1962	1 year, 310 days	Indian National Congress	Yashwantrao I	Yashwantrao Chavan
02		D. S. Palaspagar (MLC for Elected by MLAs Constituency No. 19 - Bhandara District) (Legislative Council)	08 March 1962	19 November 1962	256 days	Indian National Congress	Yashwantrao II	Yashwantrao Chavan
03		M. G. Mane (MLC for Elected by MLAs Constituency No. 02 - Ahmednagar District) (Legislative Council)	20 November 1962	24 November 1963	1 year, 4 days	Indian National Congress	Kannamwar l	Marotrao Kannamwar
04		P. K. Sawant (MLA for Chiplun Constituency No. 265- Ratnagiri District) (Legislative Assembly) (Interim Chief Minister)	25 November 1962	04 December 1963	9 days	Indian National Congress	Sawant	P. K. Sawant
05		Keshavrao Sonawane (MLA for Latur Constituency No. 235- Latur District) (Legislative Assembly)	05 December 1963	01 March 1967	3 years, 86 days	Indian National Congress	Vasantrao I	Vasantrao Naik
06		Vasantrao Naik (MLA for Pusad Constituency No. 81- Yavatmal District) (Legislative Assembly) (Chief Minister)	01 March 1967	27 October 1969	2 years, 240 days	Indian National Congress	Vasantrao II	Vasantrao Naik
07		P. K. Sawant (MLA for Chiplun Constituency No. 265- Ratnagiri District) (Legislative Assembly)	27 October 1969	13 March 1972	2 years, 138 days	Indian National Congress	Vasantrao II	Vasantrao Naik
08		Yashwantrao Mohite (MLA for Karad South Constituency No. 260- Satara District) (Legislative Assembly)	13 March 1972	04 April 1973	1 year, 32 days	Indian National Congress	Vasantrao III	Vasantrao Naik
09		Shankarrao Chavan (MLA for Bhokar Constituency No. 85- Nanded District) (Legislative Assembly)	04 April 1973	17 Match; 1974	347 days	Indian National Congress	Vasantrao III	Vasantrao Naik
10		Vasantrao Patil (MLC for Elected by MLAs Constituency No. 20 - Sangli District) (Legislative Council)	17 Match; 1974	21 February 1975	341 days	Indian National Congress	Vasantrao III	Vasantrao Naik
11		Yashwantrao Mohite (MLA for Karad South Constituency No. 260- Satara District) (Legislative Assembly)	21 February 1975	16 April 1977	2 years, 54 days	Indian National Congress	Shankarrao I	Shankarrao Chavan
12		R. J. Deotale (MLA for Bhadrawati Constituency No. 72- Chandrapur District (Legislative Assembly)	17 April 1977	07 March 1978	1 year, 324 days	Indian National Congress	Vasantdada I	Vasantdada Patil
13		Ramrao Adik (MLC for Elected by MLAs Constituency No. 05 - Ahmednagar District) (Legislative Council)	07 March 1978	18 July 1978	133 days	Indian National Congress	Vasantdada II	Vasantdada Patil
14		Bhausaheb Surve (MLA for Nagpur Central Constituency No. 55- Nagpur District) (Legislative Assembly)	18 July 1978	17 February 1980	1 year, 214 days	Indian Congress (Socialist)	Pawar I	Sharad Pawar
15		Nanabhau Yembadwar (MLC for Bhandara - Gondia Local Authorities Constituency No. 14 - Gondia District) (Legislative Council)	09 June 1980	21 January 1982	1 year, 226 days	Indian National Congress	Antulay	Abdul Rahman Antulay
16		Sharadchandrika Suresh Patil (MLA for Chopda Constituency No. 10- Jalgaon District) (Legislative Assembly)	21 January 1982	02 February 1983	1 year, 12 days	Indian National Congress	Bhosale	Babasaheb Bhosale
17		Shivajirao Patil Nilangekar (MLA for Nilanga Constituency No. 238- Latur District) (Legislative Assembly)	07 February 1983	05 March 1985	2 years, 26 days	Indian National Congress	Vasantdada III	Vasantdada Patil
18		Balachandra Bhai Sawant (MLC for Elected by MLAs Constituency No. 09 - Ratnagiri District) (Legislative Council)	12 March 1985	03 June 1985	83 days	Indian National Congress	Vasantdada IV	Vasantdada Patil
19		Surupsingh Hirya Naik (MLA for Navapur Constituency No. 04- Nandurbar District) (Legislative Assembly)	03 June 1985	12 March 1986	282 days	Indian National Congress	Nilangekar	Shivajirao Patil Nilangekar
20		Sushilkumar Shinde (MLA for Solapur City Central Constituency No. 249- Solapur District) (Legislative Assembly)	12 March 1986	26 June 1988	2 years, 106 days	Indian National Congress	Shankarrao II	Shankarrao Chavan
21		Surupsingh Hirya Naik (MLA for Navapur Constituency No. 04- Nandurbar District) (Legislative Assembly)	26 June 1988	03 March 1990	1 year, 250 days	Indian National Congress	Pawar II	Sharad Pawar
22		Sharad Pawar (MLA for Baramati Constituency No. 201- Pune District) (Legislative Assembly) (Chief Minister)	03 March 1990	25 January 1991	328 days	Indian National Congress	Pawar III	Sharad Pawar
23		Jawaharlal Darda (MLC for Elected by MLAs Constituency No. 19 - Yavatmal District) (Legislative Council)	25 January 1991	25 June 1991	151 days	Indian National Congress	Pawar III	Sharad Pawar
24		Madhukarrao Pichad (MLA for Akole Constituency No. 213- Ahmednagar District (Legislative Assembly)	25 June 1991	02 November 1992	1 year, 130 days	Indian National Congress	Sudhakarrao	Sudhakarrao Naik
25		Sudhakarrao Naik (MLA for Pusad Constituency No. 81- Yavatmal District) (Legislative Assembly) (Chief Minister)	02 November 1992	22 February 1993	112 days	Indian National Congress	Sudhakarrao	Sudhakarrao Naik
26		Shivajirao Deshmukh (MLC for Elected by MLAs Constituency No. 18 - Sangli District) (Legislative Council)	06 March 1993	14 March 1995	2 years, 8 days	Indian National Congress	Pawar IV	Sharad Pawar
27		Dattatraya Rane (MLA for Shivadi Constituency No. 183- Mumbai City District (Legislative Assembly)	14 March 1995	01 February 1999	3 years, 324 days	Bharatiya Janata Party	Joshi	Manohar Joshi
28		Vishnu Savara (MLA for Vikramgad Constituency No. 129- Palghar District) (Legislative Assembly)	01 February 1999	11 May 1999	99 days	Bharatiya Janata Party	Rane	Narayan Rane
29		Gajanan Kirtikar (MLA for Malad Constituency No. 177- Mumbai Suburban District (Legislative Assembly)	11 May 1999	17 October 1999	159 days	Shiv Sena	Rane	Narayan Rane
30		Jaywantrao Awale (MLA for Vadgaon Maval Constituency No. 192- Pune District (Legislative Assembly)	19 October 1999	16 January 2003	3 years, 89 days	Indian National Congress	Deshmukh I	Vilasrao Deshmukh
31		Surupsingh Hirya Naik (MLA for Navapur Constituency No. 04- Nandurbar District) (Legislative Assembly)	18 January 2003	01 November 2004	1 year, 295 days	Indian National Congress	Sushilkumar	Sushilkumar Shinde
32		R. R. Patil (MLA for Tasgaon-Kavathe Mahankal Constituency No. 287- Sangli District) (Legislative Assembly) (Deputy Chief Minister)	01 November 2004	09 November 2004	8 days	Nationalist Congress Party	Deshmukh II	Vilasrao Deshmukh
33		Vijaykumar Krishnarao Gavit (MLA for Nandurbar Constituency No. 03- Nandurbar District) (Legislative Assembly)	09 November 2004	01 December 2008	4 years, 22 days	Nationalist Congress Party	Deshmukh II	Vilasrao Deshmukh
34		Surupsingh Hirya Naik (MLA for Navapur Constituency No. 04- Nandurbar District) (Legislative Assembly)	08 December 2008	06 November 2009	333 days	Indian National Congress	Ashok I	Ashok Chavan
35		Shivajirao Moghe (MLA for Arni Constituency No. 80- Yavatmal District) (Legislative Assembly)	07 November 2009	10 November 2010	1 year, 3 days	Indian National Congress	Ashok II	Ashok Chavan
36		Babanrao Pachpute (MLA for Shrigonda Constituency No. 226- Ahmednagar District (Legislative Assembly)	11 November 2010	11 June 2013	2 years, 212 days	Nationalist Congress Party	Prithviraj	Prithviraj Chavan
37		Madhukarrao Pichad (MLA for Akole Constituency No. 213- Ahmednagar District (Legislative Assembly)	11 June 2013	26 September 2014	1 year, 107 days	Nationalist Congress Party	Prithviraj	Prithviraj Chavan
38		Devendra Fadnavis (MLA for Nagpur South West Constituency No. 52- Nagpur District) (Legislative Assembly) (Chief_Minister)	31 October 2014	04 June 2016	1 year, 217 days	Bharatiya Janata Party	Fadnavis I	Devendra Fadnavis
39		Vishnu Savara (MLA for Vikramgad Constituency No. 129- Palghar District) (Legislative Assembly)	04 June 2016	16 June 2019	3 years, 12 days	Bharatiya Janata Party	Fadnavis I	Devendra Fadnavis
40		Sanjay Kute (MLA for Jalgaon (Jamod) Constituency No. 27- Buldhana District (Legislative Assembly)	16 June 2019	12 November 2019	149 days	Bharatiya Janata Party	Fadnavis I	Devendra Fadnavis
41		Devendra Fadnavis (MLA for Nagpur South West Constituency No. 52- Nagpur District) (Legislative Assembly) (Chief_Minister); In Charge	23 November 2019	28 November 2019	5 days	Bharatiya Janata Party	Fadnavis II	Devendra Fadnavis
42		Nitin Raut (MLA for Nagpur North Constituency No. 57- Nagpur District) (Legislative Assembly)	28 November 2019	30 December 2019	32 days	Indian National Congress	Thackeray	Uddhav Thackeray
43		Vijay Namdevrao Wadettiwar (MLA for Bramhapuri Constituency No. 73- Chandrapur District) (Legislative Assembly)	30 December 2019	29 June 2022	2 years, 181 days	Indian National Congress	Thackeray	Uddhav Thackeray
44		Eknath Shinde (MLA for Kopri-Pachpakhadi Constituency No. 147- Thane District) (Legislative Assembly) (Chief Minister); In Charge	30 June 2022	14 August 2022	45 days	Shiv Sena (2022–present)	Eknath	Eknath Shinde
45		Atul Save (MLA for Aurangabad East Constituency No. 109- Chhatrapati Sambhaji Nagar District Also Previously Known Aurangabad District (Legislative Assembly)	14 August 2022	14 July 2023	334 days	Bharatiya Janata Party	Eknath	Eknath Shinde
46		Eknath Shinde (MLA for Kopri-Pachpakhadi Constituency No. 147- Thane District) (Legislative Assembly) (Chief Minister)	14 July 2023	26 November 2024	1 year, 135 days	Shiv Sena (2022–present)	Eknath	Eknath Shinde
47		Devendra Fadnavis (MLA for Nagpur South West Constituency No. 52- Nagpur District) (Legislative Assembly) (Chief_Minister); In Charge	05 December 2024	Incumbent	1 year, 297 days	Bharatiya Janata Party	Fadnavis III	Devendra Fadnavis

== Ministers of State ==
No.	Portrait	Deputy Minister (Constituency)	Term of office			Political party	Ministry	Minister	Chief Minister
No.	Portrait	Deputy Minister (Constituency)	From	To	Period	Political party	Ministry	Minister	Chief Minister
Deputy Minister of Nomadic Tribes
Vacant			23 November 2019	28 November 2019	5 days	NA	Fadnavis II	Devendra Fadnavis	Devendra Fadnavis
01		Omprakash Babarao Kadu (MLA for Achalpur Constituency No. 42- Amravati District) (Legislative Assembly)	30 December 2019	27 June 2022	2 years, 179 days	Prahar Janshakti Party Supported Party Shiv Sena	Thackeray	Vijay Namdevrao Wadettiwar	Uddhav Thackeray
02		Dattatray Vithoba Bharne (MLA for Indapur Constituency No. 200- Pune District (Legislative Assembly); Additional_Charge	27 June 2022	29 June 2022	2 days	Nationalist Congress Party	Thackeray	Vijay Namdevrao Wadettiwar	Uddhav Thackeray
Vacant			30 June 2022	Incumbent	2 years, 149 days	NA	Eknath	Eknath Shinde (2022 - 2022); Atul Save (2023 – 2023); Eknath Shinde (2023 – 2024)	Eknath Shinde
Vacant			21 December 2024	incumbent	1 year, 281 days	NA	Fadnavis III	Devendra Fadnavis (2024 – Present)	Devendra Fadnavis
