= Ministry of Tribal Development (Maharashtra) =

Maharashtra government ministry responsible for Tribal Development

Ministry of Tribal Development Government of Maharashtra
- मंत्रालय आदिवासी विकास विभाग, महाराष्ट्र शासन
- Seal of the state of Maharashtra

- Building of Administrative Headquarters of Mumbai

Ministry overview
- Jurisdiction: (India) Maharashtra
- Headquarters: Mantralay, Mumbai
- Minister responsible: Prof.(Dr). Ashok Uike, Cabinet Minister
- Deputy Minister responsible: Indranil Naik, Minister of State
- Ministry executive: (IAS)
- Parent department: Government of Maharashtra

The Ministry of Tribal Development is a Ministry of the Government of Maharashtra state.

The Ministry is headed by a cabinet level Minister Ashok Uike is Current Minister of Tribal Development Government of Maharashtra.

== Head office ==
Minister of Tribal Development मंत्री आदिवासी विकास विभाग
- Emblem of India

- Flag of India
- Incumbent; Prof.Dr. Ashok Uike since 21 December 2024
- Ministry of Tribal Development (Maharashtra)
- Style: The Honourable
- Abbreviation: Cabinet Minister
- Member of: State Cabinet
- Reports to: Chief Minister, Maharashtra Legislature
- Seat: Mantralaya, Mumbai
- Appointer: Governor on the advice of the Chief Minister
- Term length: 5 years
- Precursor: Devendra Fadnavis; (2024- 2024)
- Inaugural holder: P. K. Sawant; (1960-1962)
- Formation: 1 May 1960
- Deputy: Indranil Naik

== Cabinet Ministers ==
No.	Portrait	Minister (Constituency)	Term of office			Political party	Ministry	Chief Minister
No.	Portrait	Minister (Constituency)	From	To	Period	Political party	Ministry	Chief Minister
Minister of Tribal Development
01		T. R. Narawane (MLA for Kurla Constituency No. 174- Mumbai Suburban District) (Legislative Assembly)	01 May 1960	07 March 1962	1 year, 310 days	Indian National Congress	Yashwantrao I	Yashwantrao Chavan
02		Parashuram Krishnaji Sawant (MLA for Chiplun Constituency No. 265- Ratnagiri District) (Legislative Assembly)	08 March 1962	19 November 1962	256 days	Indian National Congress	Yashwantrao II	Yashwantrao Chavan
03		D. S. Palapsagar (MLC for Elected by MLAs Constituency No. 19 - Bhandara District) (Legislative Council)	20 November 1962	24 November 1963	1 year, 4 days	Indian National Congress	Kannamwar l	Marotrao Kannamwar
04		Parashuram Krishnaji Sawant (MLA for Chiplun Constituency No. 265- Ratnagiri District) (Legislative Assembly) (Interim Chief Minister)	25 November 1962	04 December 1963	9 days	Indian National Congress	Sawant	Parashuram Krishnaji Sawant
05		Narendra Mahipati Tidke (MLA for Savner Constituency No. 49- Nagpur District) (Legislative Assembly)	05 December 1963	01 March 1967	3 years, 86 days	Indian National Congress	Vasantrao I	Vasantrao Naik
06		Nirmala Raje Bhosale (MLA for Satara Constituency No. 268- Satara District) (Legislative Assembly)	01 March 1967	27 October 1969	2 years, 240 days	Indian National Congress	Vasantrao II	Vasantrao Naik
07		Sadashiv Govind Barve (MLA for Shivajinagar Constituency No. 209- Pune District) (Legislative Assembly)	27 October 1969	13 March 1972	2 years, 138 days	Indian National Congress	Vasantrao II	Vasantrao Naik
08		Madhukar Dhanaji Chaudhari (MLA for Raver Constituency No. 11- Jalgaon District) (Legislative Assembly)	13 March 1972	04 April 1973	1 year, 32 days	Indian National Congress	Vasantrao III	Vasantrao Naik
09		Narendra Mahipati Tidke (MLA for Savner Constituency No. 49- Nagpur District) (Legislative Assembly)	04 April 1973	17 Match; 1974	347 days	Indian National Congress	Vasantrao III	Vasantrao Naik
10		M. B. Popat (MLA for Dhobitalao Constituency No. 160- Mumbai City District) (Legislative Assembly)	17 Match; 1974	21 February 1975	341 days	Indian National Congress	Vasantrao III	Vasantrao Naik
11		Vasantdada Patil (MLA for Sangli Constituency No. 282- Sangli District) (Legislative Assembly)	21 February 1975	16 April 1977	2 years, 54 days	Indian National Congress	Shankarrao I	Shankarrao Chavan
12		Nashikrao Tirpude (MLA for Bhandara Constituency No. 61- Bhandara District) (Legislative Assembly)	17 April 1977	07 March 1978	1 year, 324 days	Indian National Congress	Vasantdada I	Vasantdada Patil
Minister of Tribal Welfare
13		Ramrao Adik (MLC for Elected by MLAs Constituency No. 05 - Ahmednagar District) (Legislative Council)	07 March 1978	18 July 1978	133 days	Indian National Congress	Vasantdada II	Vasantdada Patil
Minister of Tribal Development
14		Sundarrao Solanke (MLA for Majalgaon Constituency No. 229- Beed District) (Legislative Assembly) (Deputy Chief Minister)	18 July 1978	18 February 1980	1 year, 215 days	Indian Congress (Socialist)	Pawar I	Sharad Pawar
Minister of Tribal Welfare
15		Pramilaben Yagnik (MLC for Elected by MLAs Constituency No. 12 - Mumbai City District) (Legislative Council)	09 June 1980	21 January 1982	1 year, 226 days	Indian National Congress	Antulay	Abdul Rahman Antulay
16		Surupsingh Hirya Naik (MLA for Navapur Constituency No. 04- Nandurbar District) (Legislative Assembly)	21 January 1982	02 February 1983	1 year, 12 days	Indian National Congress	Bhosale	Babasaheb Bhosale
17		Surupsingh Hirya Naik (MLA for Navapur Constituency No. 04- Nandurbar District) (Legislative Assembly)	07 February 1983	05 March 1985	2 years, 26 days	Indian National Congress	Vasantdada III	Vasantdada Patil
18		Surupsingh Hirya Naik (MLA for Navapur Constituency No. 04- Nandurbar District) (Legislative Assembly)	12 March 1985	03 June 1985	83 days	Indian National Congress	Vasantdada IV	Vasantdada Patil
19		Surupsingh Hirya Naik (MLA for Navapur Constituency No. 04- Nandurbar District) (Legislative Assembly)	03 June 1985	12 March 1986	282 days	Indian National Congress	Nilangekar	Shivajirao Patil Nilangekar
Minister of Tribal Development
20		Sushilkumar Shinde (MLA for Solapur City Central Constituency No. 249- Solapur District) (Legislative Assembly)	12 March 1986	26 June 1988	2 years, 106 days	Indian National Congress	Shankarrao II	Shankarrao Chavan
Minister of Tribal Welfare
21		Surupsingh Hirya Naik (MLA for Navapur Constituency No. 04- Nandurbar District) (Legislative Assembly)	26 June 1988	03 March 1990	1 year, 250 days	Indian National Congress	Pawar II	Sharad Pawar
22		Surupsingh Hirya Naik (MLA for Navapur Constituency No. 04- Nandurbar District) (Legislative Assembly)	03 March 1990	25 June 1991	1 year, 114 days	Indian National Congress	Pawar III	Sharad Pawar
Minister of Tribal Development
23		Madhukarrao Pichad (MLA for Akole Constituency No. 213- Ahmednagar District (Legislative Assembly)	25 June 1991	02 November 1992	1 year, 130 days	Indian National Congress	Sudhakarrao	Sudhakarrao Naik
24		Sudhakarrao Naik (MLA for Pusad Constituency No. 81- Yavatmal District) (Legislative Assembly) (Chief Minister)	02 November 1992	22 February 1993	112 days	Indian National Congress	Sudhakarrao	Sudhakarrao Naik
25		Madhukarrao Pichad (MLA for Akole Constituency No. 213- Ahmednagar District (Legislative Assembly)	06 March 1993	18 November 1994	1 year, 257 days	Indian National Congress	Pawar IV	Sharad Pawar
26		Dattatraya Rane (MLA for Shivadi Constituency No. 183- Mumbai City District (Legislative Assembly)	14 March 1995	01 February 1999	3 years, 324 days	Bharatiya Janata Party	Joshi	Manohar Joshi
27		Daulatrao Aher (MLC for Elected by MLAs Constituency No. 21 - Nashik District) (Legislative Council)	01 February 1999	11 May 1999	99 days	Bharatiya Janata Party	Rane	Narayan Rane
28		Vishnu Savara (MLA for Vikramgad Constituency No. 129- Palghar District) (Legislative Assembly)	11 May 1999	17 October 1999	159 days	Bharatiya Janata Party	Rane	Narayan Rane
29		Chhagan Bhujbal (MLC for Elected by MLAs Constituency No. 09 - Mumbai City District) (Legislative Council) (Deputy Chief Minister)	19 October 1999	27 October 1999	8 days	Nationalist Congress Party	Deshmukh I	Vilasrao Deshmukh
30		Madhukarrao Pichad (MLA for Akole Constituency No. 213- Ahmednagar District (Legislative Assembly)	27 October 1999	16 January 2003	3 years, 81 days	Nationalist Congress Party	Deshmukh I	Vilasrao Deshmukh
31		Satish Chaturvedi (MLA for Nagpur East Constituency No. 54- Nagpur district) (Legislative Assembly)	18 January 2003	01 November 2004	1 year, 295 days	Indian National Congress	Sushilkumar	Sushilkumar Shinde
32		R. R. Patil (MLA for Tasgaon-Kavathe Mahankal Constituency No. 287- Sangli District) (Legislative Assembly) (Deputy Chief Minister)	01 November 2004	09 November 2004	8 days	Nationalist Congress Party	Deshmukh II	Vilasrao Deshmukh
33		Vijaykumar Krishnarao Gavit (MLA for Nandurbar Constituency No. 03- Nandurbar District) (Legislative Assembly)	09 November 2004	01 December 2008	4 years, 22 days	Nationalist Congress Party	Deshmukh II	Vilasrao Deshmukh
34		Vijaykumar Krishnarao Gavit (MLA for Nandurbar Constituency No. 03- Nandurbar District) (Legislative Assembly)	08 December 2008	06 November 2009	333 days	Indian National Congress	Ashok I	Ashok Chavan
35		Babanrao Pachpute (MLA for Shrigonda Constituency No. 226- Ahmednagar District (Legislative Assembly)	07 November 2009	10 November 2010	1 year, 3 days	Nationalist Congress Party	Ashok II	Ashok Chavan
36		Babanrao Pachpute (MLA for Shrigonda Constituency No. 226- Ahmednagar District (Legislative Assembly)	11 November 2010	11 June 2013	2 years, 212 days	Nationalist Congress Party	Prithviraj	Prithviraj Chavan
37		Madhukarrao Pichad (MLA for Akole Constituency No. 213- Ahmednagar District (Legislative Assembly)	11 June 2013	26 September 2014	1 year, 107 days	Nationalist Congress Party	Prithviraj	Prithviraj Chavan
38		Vishnu Savara (MLA for Vikramgad Constituency No. 129- Palghar District) (Legislative Assembly)	31 October 2014	16 June 2019	4 years, 228 days	Bharatiya Janata Party	Fadnavis I	Devendra Fadnavis
39		Ashok Uike (MLA for Ralegaon Constituency No. 77- Yavatmal District) (Legislative Assembly)	16 June 2019	12 November 2019	149 days	Bharatiya Janata Party	Fadnavis I	Devendra Fadnavis
40		Devendra Fadnavis (MLA for Nagpur South West Constituency No. 52- Nagpur District) (Legislative Assembly) (Chief_Minister); In Charge	23 November 2019	28 November 2019	5 days	Bharatiya Janata Party	Fadnavis II	Devendra Fadnavis
41		Nitin Raut (MLA for Nagpur North Constituency No. 57- Nagpur District) (Legislative Assembly)	28 November 2019	30 December 2019	32 days	Indian National Congress	Thackeray	Uddhav Thackeray
42		Kagda Chandya Padvi (MLA for Akkalkuwa Constituency No. 01- Nandurbar District) (Legislative Assembly)	30 December 2019	29 June 2022	2 years, 181 days	Indian National Congress	Thackeray	Uddhav Thackeray
43		Eknath Shinde (MLA for Kopri-Pachpakhadi Constituency No. 147- Thane District) (Legislative Assembly) (Chief Minister); In Charge	30 June 2022	14 August 2022	45 days	Shiv Sena (2022–present)	Eknath	Eknath Shinde
44		Vijaykumar Krishnarao Gavit (MLA for Nandurbar Constituency No. 03- Nandurbar District) (Legislative Assembly)	14 August 2022	26 November 2024	2 years, 135 days	Bharatiya Janata Party	Eknath	Eknath Shinde
45		Devendra Fadnavis (MLA for Nagpur South West Constituency No. 52- Nagpur District) (Legislative Assembly) (Chief_Minister); In Charge	05 December 2024	21 December 2024	16 days	Bharatiya Janata Party	Fadnavis III	Devendra Fadnavis
46		Prof.Dr. Ashok Uike (MLA for Ralegaon Constituency No. 77- Yavatmal District) (Legislative Assembly)	21 December 2024	Incumbent	1 year, 281 days	Bharatiya Janata Party	Fadnavis III	Devendra Fadnavis

== Ministers of State ==
No.	Portrait	Deputy Minister (Constituency)	Term of office			Political party	Ministry	Minister	Chief Minister
No.	Portrait	Deputy Minister (Constituency)	From	To	Period	Political party	Ministry	Minister	Chief Minister
Deputy Minister of Tribal Development
The Post of Deputy Minister / Minister of States has been kept Vacant from 23 November 2019 To 28 November 2019			23 November 2019	28 November 2019	5 days	NA	Fadnavis II	Devendra Fadnavis	Devendra Fadnavis
01		Prajakt Tanpure (MLA for Rahuri Constituency No. 223- Ahmednagar District) (Legislative Assembly)	30 December 2019	30 June 2022	2 years, 181 days	Nationalist Congress Party	Thackeray	Kagda Chandya Padvi (2019-2022)	Uddhav Thackeray
The Post of Deputy Minister / Minister of States has been kept Vacant from 30 June 2022 to 21 December 2024			30 June 2022	26 November 2024	2 years, 149 days	NA	Eknath	Eknath Shinde (2022-2022); Vijaykumar Krishnarao Gavit (2022-2024)	Eknath Shinde
02		Indranil Naik (MLA for Pusad Constituency No. 81- Yavatmal District) (Legislative Assembly)	21 December 2024	Incumbent	1 year, 281 days	Nationalist Congress Party (Ajit Pawar Group)	Fadnavis III	Prof.Dr. Ashok Uike (2024 – Present)	Devendra Fadnavis
