= Ministry of Forest (Maharashtra) =

Government department of Maharashtra, India

Ministry of Forests Government of Maharashtra
- मंत्रालय वनविभाग, महाराष्ट्र शासन
- Seal of the state of Maharashtra

- Building of Administrative Headquarters of Mumbai

Agency overview
- Formed: 1960; 66 years ago
- Preceding agency: Forests Department
- Jurisdiction: Chief Minister of Maharashtra
- Headquarters: Mantralaya, Mumbai
- Annual budget: State budget of Government of Maharashtra
- Minister responsible: Ganesh Naik, Cabinet Minister
- Deputy Ministers responsible: Vacant, TBD since 29 June 2022, Minister of State
- Agency executive: Principal Secretary; Joint Secretary; Deputy Secretary

The Ministry of Forests (Maharashtra) is a Ministry of the Government of Maharashtra. It is headed by Cabinet Minister Ganesh Ramachandra Naik.

== Office bearers ==
Minister of Forests Department मंत्री वन विभाग
- Emblem of India

- Flag of India

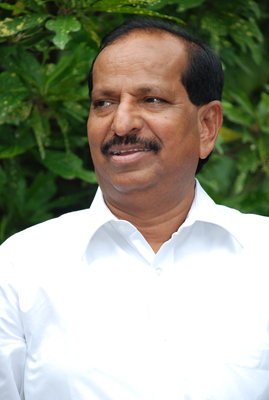
- Incumbent; Ganesh Naik since 21 December 2024
- Ministry of Forests Department
- Style: The Honourable
- Abbreviation: Cabinet Minister
- Member of: State Cabinet
- Reports to: Chief Minister, Maharashtra Legislature
- Seat: Mantralaya, Mumbai
- Appointer: Governor on the advice of the Chief Minister
- Term length: 5 years
- Precursor: Devendra Fadnavis
- Inaugural holder: D. S. Palaspagar (1960-1962)
- Formation: 1 May 1960
- Deputy: Vacant, TBD; since 29 June 2022

== Cabinet Ministers ==
No.	Portrait	Minister (Constituency)	Term of office			Political party	Ministry	Chief Minister
No.	Portrait	Minister (Constituency)	From	To	Period	Political party	Ministry	Chief Minister
Minister of Forests Department
01		B. G. Gadhe (MLA for Jalna North Constituency No. 101- Jalna District) (Legislative Assembly)	01 May 1960	07 March 1962	1 year, 310 days	Indian National Congress	Yashwantrao I	Yashwantrao Chavan
02		D. S. Palaspagar (MLC for Elected by MLAs Constituency No. 19 - Bhandara District) (Legislative Council)	08 March 1962	19 November 1962	256 days	Indian National Congress	Yashwantrao II	Yashwantrao Chavan
03		D. S. Palaspagar (MLC for Elected by MLAs Constituency No. 19 - Bhandara District) (Legislative Council)	20 November 1962	24 November 1963	1 year, 4 days	Indian National Congress	Kannamwar l	Marotrao Kannamwar
04		Parashuram Krishnaji Sawant (MLA for Chiplun Constituency No. 265- Ratnagiri District) (Legislative Assembly) (Interim Chief Minister)	25 November 1962	04 December 1963	9 days	Indian National Congress	Sawant	Parashuram Krishnaji Sawant
05		Vasantrao Naik (MLA for Pusad Constituency No. 81- Yavatmal District) (Legislative Assembly) (Chief Minister)	05 December 1963	01 March 1967	3 years, 86 days	Indian National Congress	Vasantrao I	Vasantrao Naik
06		Parashuram Krishnaji Sawant (MLA for Chiplun Constituency No. 265- Ratnagiri District) (Legislative Assembly)	01 March 1967	27 October 1969	2 years, 240 days	Indian National Congress	Vasantrao II	Vasantrao Naik
07		Vasantrao Naik (MLA for Pusad Constituency No. 81- Yavatmal District) (Legislative Assembly) (Chief Minister)	27 October 1969	13 March 1972	2 years, 138 days	Indian National Congress	Vasantrao II	Vasantrao Naik
08		Shankarrao Chavan (MLA for Bhokar Constituency No. 85- Nanded District) (Legislative Assembly)	13 March 1972	04 April 1973	1 year, 32 days	Indian National Congress	Vasantrao III	Vasantrao Naik
09		Madhukar Dhanaji Chaudhari (MLA for Raver Constituency No. 11- Jalgaon District) (Legislative Assembly)	04 April 1973	17 Match; 1974	347 days	Indian National Congress	Vasantrao III	Vasantrao Naik
10		Narendra Mahipati Tidke (MLA for Savner Constituency No. 49- Nagpur District) (Legislative Assembly)	17 Match; 1974	21 February 1975	341 days	Indian National Congress	Vasantrao III	Vasantrao Naik
11		R. J. Deotale (MLA for Bhadrawati Constituency No. 72- Chandrapur District (Legislative Assembly)	21 February 1975	16 April 1977	2 years, 54 days	Indian National Congress	Shankarrao I	Shankarrao Chavan
12		R. J. Deotale (MLA for Bhadrawati Constituency No. 72- Chandrapur District (Legislative Assembly)	17 April 1977	07 March 1978	1 year, 324 days	Indian National Congress	Vasantdada I	Vasantdada Patil
13		Nashikrao Tirpude (MLA for Bhandara Constituency No. 61- Bhandara District) (Legislative Assembly) (Deputy Chief Minister)	07 March 1978	18 July 1978	133 days	Indian National Congress (Indira)	Vasantdada II	Vasantdada Patil
14		Sadanand Varde (MLA for Vandre Constituency No. 176- Mumbai Suburban District) (Legislative Assembly)	18 July 1978	18 February 1980	1 year, 124 days	Janata Party	Pawar I	Sharad Pawar
15		Ganpatrao Deshmukh (MLA for Sangola Constituency No. 235- Solapur District (Legislative Assembly)	19 November 1979	18 February 1980	91 days	Peasants and Workers Party of India	Pawar I	Sharad Pawar
16		Abdul Rahman Antulay (MLA for Shrivardhan Constituency No. 193- Raigad District) (Legislative Assembly) (Chief Minister)	09 June 1980	21 January 1982	1 year, 226 days	Indian National Congress	Antulay	Abdul Rahman Antulay
Minister of Forests Department and Minister of Social Forestry
17		S. M. I. Aseer (MLA for Ahmednagar South Constituency No. 223- Ahmednagar District (Legislative Assembly)	21 January 1982	02 February 1983	1 year, 12 days	Indian National Congress	Bhosale	Babasaheb Bhosale
18		Surupsingh Hirya Naik (MLA for Navapur Constituency No. 04- Nandurbar District) (Legislative Assembly)	07 February 1983	05 March 1985	2 years, 26 days	Indian National Congress	Vasantdada III	Vasantdada Patil
19		Surupsingh Hirya Naik (MLA for Navapur Constituency No. 04- Nandurbar District) (Legislative Assembly)	12 March 1985	03 June 1985	83 days	Indian National Congress	Vasantdada IV	Vasantdada Patil
20		Surupsingh Hirya Naik (MLA for Navapur Constituency No. 04- Nandurbar District) (Legislative Assembly)	03 June 1985	12 March 1986	282 days	Indian National Congress	Nilangekar	Shivajirao Patil Nilangekar
21		Vilasrao Deshmukh (MLA for Latur City Constituency No. 235- Latur District) (Legislative Assembly)	12 March 1986	26 June 1988	2 years, 106 days	Indian National Congress	Shankarrao II	Shankarrao Chavan
22		Chhedilal Gupta (MLA for Gondiya Constituency No. 134- Gondiya District) (Legislative Assembly)	26 June 1988	03 March 1990	1 year, 250 days	Indian National Congress	Pawar II	Sharad Pawar
23		Sharad Pawar (MLA for Baramati Constituency No. 201- Pune District) (Legislative Assembly) (Chief Minister)	03 March 1990	25 January 1991	328 days	Indian National Congress	Pawar III	Sharad Pawar
24		Datta Meghe (MLC for Elected by MLAs Constituency No. 15 - Wardha District) (Legislative Council)	25 January 1991	25 June 1991	151 days	Indian National Congress	Pawar III	Sharad Pawar
25		Madhukarrao Pichad (MLA for Akole Constituency No. 213- Ahmednagar District (Legislative Assembly)	25 June 1991	26 December 1991	184 days	Indian National Congress	Sudhakarrao	Sudhakarrao Naik
26		Shankarrao Genuji Kolhe (MLA for Kopargaon Constituency No. 219- Ahmednagar District) (Legislative Assembly)	26 December 1991	22 February 1993	1 year, 58 days	Indian National Congress	Sudhakarrao	Sudhakarrao Naik
Minister of Forests Department
27		Surupsingh Hirya Naik (MLA for Navapur Constituency No. 04- Nandurbar District) (Legislative Assembly)	06 March 1993	18 November 1994	1 year, 257 days	Indian National Congress	Pawar IV	Sharad Pawar
28		Ganesh Naik (MLA for Belapur Constituency No. 151- Thane District) (Legislative Assembly)	14 March 1995	01 February 1999	3 years, 324 days	Shiv Sena	Joshi	Manohar Joshi
29		Gopinath Munde (MLA for Renapur Constituency No. 236 - Latur District) (Legislative Assembly) (Deputy Chief Minister)	01 February 1999	11 May 1999	99 days	Bharatiya Janata Party	Rane	Narayan Rane
30		Sudhir Joshi (MLC for Elected by MLAs Constituency No. 21 - Mumbai City District) (Legislative Council)	11 May 1999	17 October 1999	159 days	Shiv Sena	Rane	Narayan Rane
31		Surupsingh Hirya Naik (MLA for Navapur Constituency No. 04- Nandurbar District) (Legislative Assembly)	19 October 1999	16 January 2003	3 years, 89 days	Indian National Congress	Deshmukh I	Vilasrao Deshmukh
32		Vijaysinh Mohite–Patil (MLA for Malshiras Constituency No. 254- Solapur District) (Legislative Assembly)	18 January 2003	01 November 2004	1 year, 295 days	Nationalist Congress Party	Sushilkumar	Sushilkumar Shinde
33		R. R. Patil (MLA for Tasgaon-Kavathe Mahankal Constituency No. 287- Sangli District) (Legislative Assembly) (Deputy Chief Minister)	01 November 2004	09 November 2004	8 days	Nationalist Congress Party	Deshmukh II	Vilasrao Deshmukh
34		Babanrao Pachpute (MLA for Shrigonda Constituency No. 226- Ahmednagar District (Legislative Assembly)	09 November 2004	01 December 2008	4 years, 22 days	Nationalist Congress Party	Deshmukh II	Vilasrao Deshmukh
35		Babanrao Pachpute (MLA for Shrigonda Constituency No. 226- Ahmednagar District (Legislative Assembly)	08 December 2008	06 November 2009	333 days	Nationalist Congress Party	Ashok I	Ashok Chavan
36		Patangrao Kadam (MLA for Palus-Kadegaon Constituency No. 285- Sangli District) (Legislative Assembly)	07 November 2009	10 November 2010	1 year, 3 days	Indian National Congress	Ashok II	Ashok Chavan
37		Patangrao Kadam (MLA for Palus-Kadegaon Constituency No. 285- Sangli District) (Legislative Assembly)	11 November 2010	26 September 2014	3 years, 319 days	Indian National Congress	Prithviraj	Prithviraj Chavan
38		Sudhir Mungantiwar (MLA for Ballarpur Constituency No. 72- Chandrapur District) (Legislative Assembly)	31 October 2014	12 November 2019	5 years, 12 days	Bharatiya Janata Party	Fadnavis I	Devendra Fadnavis
39		Devendra Fadnavis (MLA for Nagpur South West Constituency No. 52- Nagpur District) (Legislative Assembly) (Chief_Minister); In Charge	23 November 2019	28 November 2019	5 days	Bharatiya Janata Party	Fadnavis II	Devendra Fadnavis
40		Eknath Shinde (MLA for Kopri-Pachpakhadi Constituency No. 147- Thane District) (Legislative Assembly)	28 November 2019	30 December 2019	32 days	Shiv Sena	Thackeray	Uddhav Thackeray
41		Sanjay Rathod (MLA for Digras Constituency No. 79- Yavatmal District (Legislative Assembly)	30 December 2019	28 February 2021	1 year, 60 days	Shiv Sena	Thackeray	Uddhav Thackeray
42		Uddhav Thackeray (MLC for Elected by MLAs Constituency No. 25 - Mumbai Suburban District) (Legislative Council) (Chief Minister)	28 February 2021	29 June 2022	1 year, 121 days	Shiv Sena	Thackeray	Uddhav Thackeray
43		Eknath Shinde (MLA for Kopri-Pachpakhadi Constituency No. 147- Thane District) (Legislative Assembly) (Chief Minister); In Charge	30 June 2022	14 August 2022	45 days	Shiv Sena (2022–present)	Eknath	Eknath Shinde
44		Sudhir Mungantiwar (MLA for Ballarpur Constituency No. 72- Chandrapur District) (Legislative Assembly)	14 August 2022	26 November 2024	2 years, 135 days	Bharatiya Janata Party	Eknath	Eknath Shinde
45		Devendra Fadnavis (MLA for Nagpur South West Constituency No. 52- Nagpur District) (Legislative Assembly) (Chief_Minister); In Charge	05 December 2024	Incumbent	1 year, 277 days	Bharatiya Janata Party	Fadnavis III	Devendra Fadnavis
46		Ganesh Naik (MLA for Airoli Constituency No. 150- Thane District) (Legislative Assembly)	21 December 2024	Incumbent	1 year, 261 days	Bharatiya Janata Party	Fadnavis III	Devendra Fadnavis

== Ministers of State ==
No.	Portrait	Deputy Minister (Constituency)	Term of office			Political party	Ministry	Minister	Chief Minister
No.	Portrait	Deputy Minister (Constituency)	From	To	Period	Political party	Ministry	Minister	Chief Minister
Deputy Minister of Forest
Vacant			23 November 2019	28 November 2019	5 days	NA	Fadnavis II	Devendra Fadnavis	Devendra Fadnavis
01		Dattatray Vithoba Bharne (MLA for Indapur Constituency No. 200- Pune District (Legislative Assembly)	30 December 2019	29 June 2022	2 years, 181 days	Nationalist Congress Party	Thackeray	Sanjay Rathod (2019 - 2021); Uddhav Thackeray (2021 - 2022)	Uddhav Thackeray
Vacant			30 June 2022	26 November 2024	2 years, 149 days	NA	Eknath	Eknath Shinde (2022 - 2022); Sudhir Mungantiwar (2022 - 2024)	Eknath Shinde
Vacant			21 December 2024	incumbent	1 year, 261 days	NA	Fadnavis III	Ganesh Naik (2024 – Present)	Devendra Fadnavis
