= Vasant Purke =

Indian politician (born 1956)

Vasantrao Purke

Chairman of Adivasi Congress Maharashtra Pradesh Congress Committee
- Incumbent
- Assumed office 6 July 2025

Member of Maharashtra Legislative Assembly
- In office (1995-1999), (1999-2004), (2004-2009), (2009 – 2014)
- Preceded by: Netaji Tanbaji Rajgadkar
- Succeeded by: Ashok Uike
- Constituency: Ralegaon

Deputy Speaker of the Maharashtra Legislative Assembly
- In office 4 December 2010 – 8 November 2014
- Speaker: Dilip Walse-Patil
- Preceded by: Madhukarrao Chavan
- Succeeded by: Vijayrao Bhaskarrao Auti

Minister of School Education, Maharashtra
- In office 9 November 2004 – 1 December 2008
- Preceded by: Ashok Chavan
- Succeeded by: Radhakrishna Vikhe Patil

Minister of Sports and Youth Welfare, Maharashtra
- In office 1 November 2004 – 4 December 2008
- Preceded by: Ramkrishna More
- Succeeded by: Patangrao Kadam

Guardian Minister of Hingoli District
- In office 1 Nov 2004 – 4 Dec 2008

Personal details
- Born: Vasant Chindhuji Purke; 3 May 1956 (age 70) At.Atmurdi, Tq.Ralegaon, Yavatmal District, Maharashtra
- Party: Indian National Congress
- Spouse: Smt.Premlata Vasantrao Purke
- Children: Pradhnya Bhupesh Uike (Purke); Unmesh Vasantrao Purke
- Parent: Chindhuji Laxmanrao Purke (Father)
- Education: Amravati University (MA)

Prof. Vasantrao Chindhuji Purke (Sir), (born 3 May 1956) is an Indian politician, elected to the Maharashtra Legislative Assembly from the Ralegaon constituency in 1995 and serving until 2014 as a member of the Indian National Congress. He is currently Vice President of Maharashtra Adivasi Development Corporation (Nashik) - Minister of State आदिवासी विकास विभाग (महाराष्ट्र शासन).
