= Shinde ministry =

Shinde ministry may refer to:

- Sushilkumar Shinde ministry, the Maharashtra government led by Sushilkumar Shinde from January 2003 to November 2004
- Eknath Shinde ministry, the Maharashtra government led by Eknath Shinde from 30 June 2022 to 5 December 2024

== See also ==
- Chief Minister of Maharashtra
