= Surupsingh Hirya Naik =

Indian politician (1938–2025)

Cabinet Minister Government of Maharashtra
- In office 08 December 2008 – 06 November 2009
- Minister: Transport; Nomadic Tribes Development; Other Backward Bahujan Welfare
- Governor: S. C. Jamir
- Cabinet: First Ashok Chavan ministry
- Chief Minister: Ashok Chavan
- Dy Chief Minister: Chhagan Bhujbal
- Preceded by: Himself (Transport); Vijaykumar Krishnarao Gavit (Nomadic Tribes); Patangrao Kadam (Other Backward Bahujan Welfare)
- Succeeded by: Radhakrishna Vikhe Patil (Transport); Shivajirao Moghe (Nomadic Tribes); Shivajirao Moghe (Other Backward Bahujan Welfare)

Cabinet Minister Government of Maharashtra
- In office 09 November 2004 – 01 December 2008
- Minister: Transport; Soil and Water Conservation
- Governor: Mohammed Fazal; S. M. Krishna; S. C. Jamir
- Cabinet: Second Deshmukh ministry
- Chief Minister: Vilasrao Deshmukh
- Dy Chief Minister: R. R. Patil
- Preceded by: Vilasrao Deshmukh (Transport); Vilasrao Deshmukh (Soil and Water Conservation)
- Succeeded by: Himself (Transport); Balasaheb Thorat (Soil and Water Conservation)

Cabinet Minister Government of Maharashtra
- In office 18 January 2003 – 01 November 2004
- Minister: Public Works (Including Public Undertakings); Nomadic Tribes; Special Backward Classes Welfare
- Governor: Mohammed Fazal
- Cabinet: Sushilkumar Shinde ministry
- Chief Minister: Sushilkumar Shinde
- Dy Chief Minister: Chhagan Bhujbal; Vijaysinh Mohite–Patil
- Preceded by: Vikramsinh Patankar (Public Works (Including Public Undertakings)); Jaywantrao Awale (Nomadic Tribes); Jaywantrao Awale (Special Backward Classes Welfare)
- Succeeded by: Anil Deshmukh (Public Works (Including Public Undertakings)); R. R. Patil (Nomadic Tribes); R. R. Patil (Special Backward Classes Welfare)

Cabinet Minister Government of Maharashtra
- In office 19 October 1999 – 16 January 2003
- Minister: Environment; Forests; State Border Defence (First)
- Governor: P. C. Alexander; Mohammed Fazal
- Cabinet: First Deshmukh ministry
- Chief Minister: Vilasrao Deshmukh
- Dy Chief Minister: Chhagan Bhujbal
- Preceded by: Chandrakant Khaire (Environment); Sudhir Joshi (Forests); Gopinath Munde (State Border Defence (First))
- Succeeded by: Vijaysinh Mohite–Patil (Environment); Vijaysinh Mohite–Patil (Forests); R. R. Patil (State Border Defence (First))

Cabinet Minister Government of Maharashtra
- In office 06 March 1993 – 14 March 1995
- Minister: Forest; Public Works (Including Public Undertakings); Other Backward Bahujan Welfare
- Governor: P. C. Alexander
- Cabinet: Fourth Pawar ministry
- Chief Minister: Sharad Pawar
- Preceded by: Shankarrao Genuji Kolhe (Forest Department); Shankarrao Genuji Kolhe (Public Works (Including Public Undertakings)); Ramrao Adik (Other Backward Bahujan Welfare)
- Succeeded by: Ganesh Naik (Forest Department); Nitin Gadkari (Public Works (Including Public Undertakings)); Gopinath Munde (Other Backward Bahujan Welfare)

Cabinet Minister Government of Maharashtra
- In office 04 March 1990 – 25 June 1991
- Minister: Tribal Welfare; Marathi Language
- Governor: Chidambaram Subramaniam
- Cabinet: Third Pawar ministry
- Chief Minister: Sharad Pawar
- Preceded by: Himself (Tribal Welfare); Narendra Marutrao Kamble (Marathi Language)
- Succeeded by: Madhukarrao Pichad (Tribal Welfare); Shivajirao Deshmukh (Marathi Language)

Cabinet Minister Government of Maharashtra
- In office 26 June 1988 – 03 March 1990
- Minister: Tribal Welfare; Transport; Nomadic Tribes
- Governor: K. Brahmananda Reddy; Chidambaram Subramaniam
- Cabinet: Second Pawar ministry
- Chief Minister: Sharad Pawar
- Preceded by: Sushilkumar Shinde (Tribal Welfare); Sushilkumar Shinde (Transport); Sushilkumar Shinde (Nomadic Tribes)
- Succeeded by: Himself (Tribal Welfare); Vijaysinh Mohite-Patil (Transport); Sharad Pawar (Nomadic Tribes)

Cabinet Minister Government of Maharashtra
- In office 03 June 1985 – 06 March 1986
- Minister: Public Works (Excluding Public Undertakings); Forest; Social Forestry; Tribal Welfare; Disaster Management; Vimukta Jati; Nomadic Tribes
- Governor: Kona Prabhakara Rao
- Cabinet: Nilangekar ministry
- Chief Minister: Shivajirao Patil Nilangekar
- Preceded by: Ramprasad Kadam Bordikar (Public Works (Excluding Public Undertakings)); Himself (Forests); Himself (Social Forestry); Himself (Tribal Welfare); Vasantdada Patil (Disaster Management); Himself (Vimukta Jati); Balachandra Bhai Sawant (Nomadic Tribes)
- Succeeded by: Vilasrao Deshmukh (Public Works (Excluding Public Undertakings)); Vilasrao Deshmukh (Forests); Vilasrao Deshmukh (Social Forestry); Sushilkumar Shinde (Tribal Welfare); V. Subramanian (Disaster Management); Ram Meghe (Vimukta Jati); Sushilkumar Shinde (Nomadic Tribes)

Cabinet Minister Government of Maharashtra
- In office 12 March 1985 – 01 June 1985
- Minister: Forest; Social Forestry; Tribal Welfare; Food and Civil Supplies; Food and Drug Administration; Woman and Child Development; Socially And Educationally Backward Classes; Vimukta Jati; Khar Land Development
- Governor: Idris Hasan Latif; Prabhakara Rao
- Cabinet: Fourth Vasantdada Patil ministry
- Chief Minister: Vasantdada Patil
- Preceded by: Himself (Forests); Himself (Social Forestry); Himself (Tribal Welfare); Pratibha Patil (Food and Civil Supplies); Ramprasad Borade (Food and Drug Administration); Sudhakarrao Naik (Woman and Child Development); Baliram Waman Hiray (Socially And Educationally Backward Classes); Ramprasad Borade (Vimukta Jati); Shantaram Gholap (Khar Land Development)
- Succeeded by: Himself (Forests); Himself (Social Forestry); Himself (Tribal Welfare); Shivajirao Deshmukh (Food and Civil Supplies); Shivajirao Deshmukh (Food and Drug Administration); Shivajirao Deshmukh (Woman and Child Development); Sudhakarrao Naik (Socially And Educationally Backward Classes); Himself (Vimukta Jati); Balachandra Bhai Sawant (Khar Land Development)

Cabinet Minister Government of Maharashtra
- In office 02 February 1983 – 09 March 1985
- Minister: Forest; Social Forestry; Tribal Welfare; Ports Development; Public Works (Including Public Undertakings)
- Governor: Idris Hasan Latif
- Cabinet: Third Vasantdada Patil ministry
- Chief Minister: Vasantdada Patil
- Dy Chief Minister: Ramrao Adik
- Preceded by: S. M. I. Aseer (Forest); S. M. I. Aseer (Social Forestry); Himself (Tribal Welfare); Pratibha Patil (Ports Development); Shivajirao Patil Nilangekar (Public Works (Including Public Undertakings))
- Succeeded by: Himself (Forest); Himself (Social Forestry); Himself (Tribal Welfare); Balachandra Bhai Sawant (Ports Development); Narendra Mahipati Tidke (Public Works (Including Public Undertakings))

Cabinet Minister Government of Maharashtra
- In office 25 January 1982 – 01 February 1983
- Minister: Public Works (Excluding Public Undertakings); Tribal Welfare; Social Welfare; Special Backward Classes Welfare; Socially And Educationally Backward Classes; Soil and Water Conservation
- Governor: Om Prakash Mehra; Idris Hasan Latif
- Cabinet: Bhosale ministry
- Chief Minister: Sharad Pawar
- Preceded by: Shalini Patil (Public Works; (Excluding Public Undertakings)): Pramilaben Yagnik (Tribal Welfare); Himself (Social Welfare); Jawaharlal Darda (Special Backward Classes Welfare); Baburao Kale (Socially And Educationally Backward Classes); Shivajirao Patil Nilangekar (Soil and Water Conservation)
- Succeeded by: Ramprasad Kadam Bordikar (Public Works; (Excluding Public Undertakings)): Pramilaben Yagnik (Tribal Welfare); Pratibha Patil (Social Welfare); Shantaram Gholap (Special Backward Classes Welfare); Baliram Waman Hiray (Socially And Educationally Backward Classes); Ramrao Adik (Soil and Water Conservation)

Cabinet Minister Government of Maharashtra
- In office 25 September 1980 – 12 January 1982
- Minister: Social Justice (09 March 1981 – 12 January 1982); Ex. Servicemen Welfare
- Governor: Sadiq Ali; Om Prakash Mehra
- Cabinet: Antulay ministry
- Chief Minister: A. R. Antulay
- Preceded by: Pramilaben Yagnik (Social Justice); Jagannathrao Jadhav (Ex. Servicemen Welfare)
- Succeeded by: Himself (Social Justice); Babasaheb Bhosale (Ex. Servicemen Welfare)

Member of the Maharashtra Legislative Assembly
- In office (1972–1978), (1985–1990), (1990–1995), (1995–1999), (1999–2004), (2004–2009), (2014 – 2019)
- Preceded by: Dharma Jayaram Kokani
- Succeeded by: Shirishkumar Surupsing Naik
- Constituency: Navapur

Member of Parliament, Lok Sabha
- In office (1977–1980), (1980 – 1981)
- Preceded by: Tukaram Huraji Gavit
- Succeeded by: Manikrao Hodlya Gavit
- Constituency: Nandurbar

Personal details
- Born: Surupsing Hirya Naik; 10 September 1938 Navagaon, Navapur taluka, Dhule district, Bombay Province, British India
- Died: December 24, 2025 (aged 87)
- Party: Indian National Congress

Surupsing Hirya Naik (10 September 1938 – 24 December 2025) was an Indian politician who was a member of the 13th Maharashtra Legislative Assembly. He represented the Navapur Assembly constituency, and belonged to the Indian National Congress. The Surupsingh Naik Ayurvedic Mahavidyalaya, a medical college in Dhule district, is named after him. He represented the constituency from 1978, before losing his seat in 2009. Naik died on 24 December 2025 at the age of 87.
