= Ashok Uike =

Indian politician (born 1964)

Minister of Tribal Development Government of Maharashtra
- Incumbent
- Assumed office 15 December 2024
- Chief Minister: Devendra Fadnavis
- Preceded by: Vijaykumar Gavit
- In office 16 June 2019 – 8 November 2019
- Chief Minister: Devendra Fadnavis
- Preceded by: Vishnu Savara
- Succeeded by: Kagda Chandya Padvi

Member of Maharashtra Legislative Assembly
- Incumbent
- Assumed office (2014-2019), (2019-2024), (2024-Present)
- Preceded by: Vasant Purke
- Constituency: Ralegaon

Guardian Minister of Chandrapur District
- Incumbent
- Assumed office 18 Jan 2025
- Preceded by: Sudhir Mungantiwar

Personal details
- Born: 1 January 1964 (age 62) Ghonsa, Wani, Yavatmal District
- Party: Bharatiya Janata Party (2014–present)
- Other political affiliations: Shiv Sena (Before 2014)
- Spouse: Bina Uike
- Children: 2 daughters
- Education: M.Sc. (Master of Science) from Amravati University 1991 - Ph.D. from Government Vidarbha Institute, Amravati

Prof. Ashok Ramaji Uike is an Indian politician & three term MLA. He was elected to the Maharashtra Legislative Assembly from the Ralegaon constituency in the 2014 Maharashtra Legislative Assembly election as a member of the Bharatiya Janata Party. He was sworn in as Minister of Tribal Development in Devendra Fadnavis cabinet in Dec 2024.

== Political career ==
=== Party affiliation ===
- Currently aligned with the Bharatiya Janata Party (BJP) (from 2014 onwards)
- Formerly associated with Shiv Sena (until 2014)

==== Legislative work ====
- MLA, Maharashtra Legislative Assembly, Ralegaon (ST) Constituency
- Terms served: 2014–2019, 2019–2024, and 2024–Present

== Ministerial roles ==
=== Minister of Tribal Development, Maharashtra ===
- Initially held the post on 16 June 2019 (Fadnavis I ministry), serving until 8 November 2019
- Reappointed to the same portfolio in the Third Fadnavis ministry, starting 15 December 2024—currently incumbent

=== Guardian Minister of Chandrapur District ===
- Appointed Guardian Minister for Chandrapur District on 18 January 2025, a position he currently holds
