= Ralegaon Assembly constituency =

Constituency of the Maharashtra legislative assembly in India

Coordinates: 20.42°N 78.52°E

Ralegaon
- Constituency No. 77 for the Maharashtra Legislative Assembly

Constituency details
- Country: India
- Region: Western India
- State: Maharashtra
- District: Yavatmal
- Lok Sabha constituency: Yavatmal-Washim
- Established: 1967
- Total electors: 288,150
- Reservation: ST

Member of Legislative Assembly
- 15th Maharashtra Legislative Assembly
- Incumbent Ashok Uike
- Party: BJP
- Alliance: NDA
- Elected year: 2024

Ralegaon Assembly constituency is one of the 288 constituencies of the Maharashtra Vidhan Sabha and one of the seven which are located in Yavatmal district. It covers Ralegaon town and taluka and is reserved for a Scheduled Tribe candidate. Ralegaon, Kalamb and Babhulgaon taluka fall under Ralegaon Assembly constituency.

It is a part of Yavatmal-Washim Lok Sabha constituency with the adjoining Washim district along with five other Vidhan Sabha assembly constituencies, viz. Washim Assembly constituency, Karanja, Yavatmal (ST), Digras and Pusad.

== Members of the Legislative Assembly ==
Year	Member	Party
1962	Mahadeo Baliram Khandate	Indian National Congress
Before 1967: See Yelabara Assembly constituency
1967	M. N. Bhalavi	Independent
1972	Anandrao K.Deshmukh	Indian National Congress
1978	Sudhakarrao Bakaram Dhurve	Indian National Congress (I)
1980	Sudhakarrao Bakaram Dhurve	Indian National Congress (I)
1985	Gulabrao Bajirao Uike	Indian National Congress
1990	Netaji Rajgadkar	Janata Dal
1995	Vasant Purke	Indian National Congress
1999	Vasant Purke	Indian National Congress
2004	Vasant Purke	Indian National Congress
2009	Vasant Purke	Indian National Congress
2014	Ashok Uike	Bharatiya Janata Party
2019	Ashok Uike	Bharatiya Janata Party
2024	Ashok Uike	Bharatiya Janata Party

== Election results ==
=== Assembly Election 2024 ===
2024 Maharashtra Legislative Assembly election : Ralegaon
Party	Candidate	Votes	%	±%
BJP	Ashok Ramaji Uike	101,398	47.63%	▲1.20
INC	Vasant Chindhuji Purke	98,586	46.30%	▲4.92
VBA	Kiran Jaypal Kumre	2,938	1.38%	▼4.09
Independent	Uddhav Kapalu Tekam	2,816	1.32%	New
MNS	Ashok Maruti Meshram	2,023	0.95%	New
PHJSP	Arvind Chandrabhan Kulmethe	1,671	0.78%	▼0.93
NOTA	None of the Above	1,317	0.62%	▼0.43
Sanman Rajkiya Paksha	Suvarna Arun Nagose	1,302	0.61%	New
Margin of victory		2,812	1.32%	▼3.73
Turnout		214,226	74.35%	▲4.89
Total valid votes		212,909		
Registered electors		288,150		
BJP hold		Swing	▲1.20	

=== Assembly Election 2019 ===
2019 Maharashtra Legislative Assembly election : Ralegaon
Party	Candidate	Votes	%	±%
BJP	Ashok Ramaji Uike	90,823	46.43%	▼9.56
INC	Vasant Chindhuji Purke	80,948	41.38%	▲6.95
VBA	Kohale Madhav Zingraji	10,705	5.47%	New
BSP	Shailesh Bhaskar Kisan Gadekar	3,370	1.72%	▼1.46
PHJSP	Gulab Janba Pandhare	3,347	1.71%	New
NOTA	None of the Above	2,056	1.05%	▼0.27
Independent	Uttam Somaji Mankar	1,739	0.89%	New
Margin of victory		9,875	5.05%	▼16.51
Turnout		197,769		▲2.36
Total valid votes		195,620		
Registered electors		283,514		
BJP hold		Swing	▼9.56	

=== Assembly Election 2014 ===
2014 Maharashtra Legislative Assembly election : Ralegaon
Party	Candidate	Votes	%	±%
BJP	Ashok Ramaji Uike	100,618	55.99%	▲35.24
INC	Prof. Vasantrao Chindhuji Purke	61,868	34.43%	▼13.00
BSP	Suresh Yashwant Meshram	5,727	3.19%	▼0.26
SS	Uttam Ravji Madavi	5,376	2.99%	New
NOTA	None of the Above	2,369	1.32%	New
NCP	Milind Prabhakar Dhurve	1,800	1.00%	New
API	Chandrakant Devidasji Mandavgade	1,434	0.80%	New
Margin of victory		38,750	21.56%	▼4.13
Turnout		182,141		▲1.69
Total valid votes		179,709		
Registered electors		269,688		
BJP gain from INC		Swing	▲8.56	

=== Assembly Election 2009 ===
2009 Maharashtra Legislative Assembly election : Ralegaon
Party	Candidate	Votes	%	±%
INC	Prof. Vasantrao Chindhuji Purke	74,622	47.43%	▲1.51
Independent	Ashok Ramaji Uike	34,204	21.74%	New
BJP	Babasaheb Janglaji Kangale	32,641	20.75%	New
BSP	Sudhakar Baheru Chandekar	5,418	3.44%	▼4.47
Independent	Dhnyaneshwar Alias Lahanu Damdu Maraskolhe	1,767	1.12%	New
Independent	Ashok Dattuji Meshram	1,660	1.06%	New
Independent	Gajanan Mahadeorao Shrirame	1,636	1.04%	New
Margin of victory		40,418	25.69%	▲17.72
Turnout		157,384	64.96%	▼7.68
Total valid votes		157,337		
Registered electors		242,260		▲24.91
INC hold		Swing	▲1.51	

=== Assembly Election 2004 ===
2004 Maharashtra Legislative Assembly election : Ralegaon
Party	Candidate	Votes	%	±%
INC	Prof. Vasantrao Chindhuji Purke	64,686	45.92%	▼7.34
SS	Ashok Ramaji Uike	53,468	37.96%	▲6.95
BSP	Madhao Zingraji Kohale	11,152	7.92%	New
Independent	Bapurao Damaji Ade	3,556	2.52%	New
Independent	Tukaramji Raoji Meshram	3,158	2.24%	New
Independent	Dilip Bhauraoji Kannake	1,637	1.16%	New
SP	Rajgadkar Netaji Tanbaji	1,592	1.13%	New
Margin of victory		11,218	7.96%	▼14.30
Turnout		140,892	72.64%	▲12.01
Total valid votes		140,860		
Registered electors		193,948		▲16.28
INC hold		Swing	▼7.34	

=== Assembly Election 1999 ===
1999 Maharashtra Legislative Assembly election : Ralegaon
Party	Candidate	Votes	%	±%
INC	Prof. Vasantrao Chindhuji Purke	53,852	53.26%	▲23.31
SS	Atram Ramaji Gangaram	31,347	31.00%	▲23.90
NCP	Kinwatkar Arunbhau Sakharamji	10,971	10.85%	New
Independent	Surpam Laxman Bhusru	1,439	1.42%	New
Independent	Kowe Purushottam Tanba	1,421	1.41%	New
Independent	Dilip Keshaorao Nehare	1,291	1.28%	New
Margin of victory		22,505	22.26%	▲12.40
Turnout		107,177	64.26%	▼15.17
Total valid votes		101,105		
Registered electors		166,787		▼2.32
INC hold		Swing	▲23.31	

=== Assembly Election 1995 ===
1995 Maharashtra Legislative Assembly election : Ralegaon
Party	Candidate	Votes	%	±%
INC	Prof. Vasantrao Chindhuji Purke	38,759	29.95%	▼6.36
Independent	Letuji Laxman Jungare	26,000	20.09%	New
Independent	Ramdasji Mangalji Atram	13,269	10.25%	New
SS	Prahlad Urkudaji Poyam	9,193	7.10%	▲3.78
BSP	Dashrath Pandurang Madavi	8,605	6.65%	New
Independent	Thakare Janrao Marotrao	8,351	6.45%	New
BBM	Milind Prabhakar Dhurve	7,309	5.65%	New
Margin of victory		12,759	9.86%	▲1.32
Turnout		133,581	78.24%	▲26.37
Total valid votes		129,406		
Registered electors		170,741		▲12.10
INC gain from JD		Swing	▼14.90	

=== Assembly Election 1990 ===
1990 Maharashtra Legislative Assembly election : Ralegaon
Party	Candidate	Votes	%	±%
JD	Netaji Tanbaji Rajgadkar	33,759	44.85%	New
INC	Wooike Gulabrao Bajirao	27,334	36.31%	▼25.62
Independent	Champatrao Nagorao Sayam	3,203	4.26%	New
Independent	Thakare Janrao Matori	2,603	3.46%	New
SS	Wandhare Suryabhan Maroti	2,503	3.33%	New
Independent	Subhash Shankarrao Chaudhari	1,405	1.87%	New
Hindustan Janta Party	Sorate Ghanshyam Sadashiv	887	1.18%	New
Margin of victory		6,425	8.54%	▼23.50
Turnout		76,750	50.39%	▲5.47
Total valid votes		75,270		
Registered electors		152,312		▲22.74
JD gain from INC		Swing	▼17.09	

=== Assembly Election 1985 ===
1985 Maharashtra Legislative Assembly election : Ralegaon
Party	Candidate	Votes	%	±%
INC	Gulabrao Bajirao Uike	33,783	61.94%	New
IC(S)	Madavi Dadarao Nimbaji	16,311	29.91%	New
Independent	Pendram Suresh Shakar	3,941	7.23%	New
Independent	Yelade Rambhau Tanbaji	507	0.93%	New
Margin of victory		17,472	32.03%	▼39.67
Turnout		55,397	44.64%	▲3.74
Total valid votes		54,542		
Registered electors		124,096		▲7.60
INC gain from INC(I)		Swing	▼21.12	

=== Assembly Election 1980 ===
1980 Maharashtra Legislative Assembly election : Ralegaon
Party	Candidate	Votes	%	±%
INC(I)	Dhurve Sudhakarrao Bakaram	38,521	83.06%	▲3.87
INC(U)	Poyam Krisha Urkuda	5,264	11.35%	New
BJP	Keram Jangaji Godraji	1,149	2.48%	New
Independent	Sorte Ghanshyam Sadashiorao	1,144	2.47%	New
Independent	Todase Rambhau Mahadeo	301	0.65%	New
Margin of victory		33,257	71.71%	▲0.34
Turnout		47,236	40.96%	▼26.03
Total valid votes		46,379		
Registered electors		115,331		▲5.39
INC(I) hold		Swing	▲3.87	

=== Assembly Election 1978 ===
1978 Maharashtra Legislative Assembly election : Ralegaon
Party	Candidate	Votes	%	±%
INC(I)	Dhurve Sudhakarrao Bakaram	57,404	79.19%	New
INC	Kerzerkar Digambar Haribhau	5,666	7.82%	▼45.77
CPI	Rajgadkar Netaji Tanabaji	5,039	6.95%	New
PWPI	Buchke Govindrao Punjaji	3,182	4.39%	New
Independent	Kinnake Damdu Krushnaji	1,202	1.66%	New
Margin of victory		51,738	71.37%	▲58.12
Turnout		74,687	68.25%	▲10.50
Total valid votes		72,493		
Registered electors		109,433		▲22.24
INC(I) gain from INC		Swing	▲25.60	

=== Assembly Election 1972 ===
1972 Maharashtra Legislative Assembly election : Ralegaon
Party	Candidate	Votes	%	±%
INC	Anandrao K Rao Deshmukh	26,742	53.58%	▲22.25
AIFB	Dhurve Prabhakar Bakaram	20,131	40.34%	New
Independent	Uike Vasantaro Parnaji	2,253	4.51%	New
Independent	Kesha Bhimji Surpam	783	1.57%	New
Margin of victory		6,611	13.25%	▼14.11
Turnout		51,241	57.24%	▼4.35
Total valid votes		49,909		
Registered electors		89,526		▲8.74
INC gain from Independent		Swing	▼5.10	

=== Assembly Election 1967 ===
1967 Maharashtra Legislative Assembly election : Ralegaon
Party	Candidate	Votes	%	±%
Independent	M. N. Bhalavi	29,036	58.68%	New
INC	Mahadeo Baliram Khandate	15,502	31.33%	
RPI	S. G. Choudhari	4,944	9.99%	New
Margin of victory		13,534	27.35%	
Turnout		54,162	65.78%	
Total valid votes		49,482		
Registered electors		82,334		
Independent win (new seat)				
