= Second Ashok Chavan ministry =

Government of Maharashtra, India (2009–2010)

- Ministry of Maharashtra
- Date formed: 7 November 2009
- Date dissolved: 9 November 2010

People and organisations
- Head of state: Governor S. C. Jamir (2009–10); Governor K. Sankaranarayanan (2010)
- Head of government: Ashok Chavan
- No. of ministers: 37; Congress (17); NCP (20)
- Member parties: Congress; NCP
- Status in legislature: Coalition
- Opposition party: BJP; Shiv Sena
- Opposition leader: Eknath Khadse (BJP) (Assembly); Pandurang Fundkar (BJP) (Council)

History
- Election: 2009
- Legislature term: 5 years
- Predecessor: First Ashok Chavan ministry
- Successor: Prithviraj Chavan ministry

The incumbent Maharashtra Chief Minister Ashok Chavan led his Congress party and alliance partner NCP to an electoral majority in the 2009 Maharashtra Legislative Assembly election. He subsequently formed his second cabinet. Chavan had been the Chief Minister since 8 December 2008, and would continue to serve until 9 November 2010, when he resigned at the backdrop of corruption allegations.

The cabinet consisted of 23 ministers, including Chavan and his Deputy, Chhagan Bhujbal.

== Council of Ministers ==
The following is the list of ministers in the cabinet:

=== Cabinet Ministers ===
Portfolio	Minister	Took office	Left office	Party
Chief Minister; Urban Development; Housing; General Administration; Information & Public Relations; Information Technology; Cultural Affairs; Any other departments not allotted to any Minister	Ashok Chavan	7 November 2009	11 November 2010	INC
Deputy Chief Minister; Minister of Public Works	Chhagan Bhujbal	7 November 2009	11 November 2010	NCP
Minister of Home Affairs	R. R. Patil	7 November 2009	11 November 2010	NCP
Minister of Finance & Planning	Sunil Tatkare	7 November 2009	11 November 2010	NCP
Minister of Revenue & Khar land Development; Minister of Earthquake Rehabilitation; Minister of Relief & Rehabilitation	Narayan Rane	7 November 2009	11 November 2010	INC
Minister of Water Resources; Minister of Water Resources (Krishna Valley); Minister of Energy	Ajit Pawar	7 November 2009	11 November 2010	NCP
Minister of Transport; Minister of Ports Development; Minister of Law & Judiciary	Radhakrishna Vikhe Patil	7 November 2009	11 November 2010	INC
Minister of Rural Development; Minister of Environment	Jayant Patil	7 November 2009	11 November 2010	NCP
Minister of Co-operation; Minister of Marketing; Minister of Parliamentary Affairs	Harshvardhan Patil	7 November 2009	11 November 2010	INC
Minister of State Excise; Minister of Non-Conventional Energy	Ganesh Naik	7 November 2009	11 November 2010	NCP
Minister of Forest	Patangrao Kadam	7 November 2009	11 November 2010	INC
Minister of Social Justice; Minister of Nomadic Tribes; Minister of Other Backward Classes	Shivajirao Moghe	7 November 2009	11 November 2010	INC
Minister of Animal Husbandry, Dairy & Fisheries	Nitin Raut	7 November 2009	11 November 2010	INC
Minister Water Supply & Sanitation	Laxman Dhobale	7 November 2009	11 November 2010	NCP
Minister of Food & Civil Supplies	Anil Deshmukh	7 November 2009	11 November 2010	NCP
Minister of Public Works (Public Undertakings)	Jaydattaji Kshirsagar	7 November 2009	11 November 2010	NCP
Minister of Food & Drug Administration	Manohar Naik	7 November 2009	11 November 2010	NCP
Minister of Medical Education; Minister of Horticulture; Minister of Tourism	Vijaykumar Gavit	7 November 2009	11 November 2010	NCP
Minister of Tribal Development	Babanrao Pachpute	7 November 2009	11 November 2010	NCP
Minister of Higher & Technical Education	Rajesh Tope	7 November 2009	11 November 2010	NCP
Minister of Industries & Mining; Minister of Employment Guarantee	Rajendra Darda	7 November 2009	11 November 2010	INC
Minister of Textiles; Minister of Minority Development & Aukaf	Naseem Khan	7 November 2009	11 November 2010	INC
Minister of Public Health; Minister of Sports& Youth Welfare	Suresh Shetty	7 November 2009	11 November 2010	INC
Minister of Woman & Child Development	Subhash Zanak	7 November 2009	11 November 2010	INC

=== Ministers of State ===
Portfolio	Minister	Took office	Left office	Party
Rural Development; Horticulture; Water Supply & Sanitation	Ranjit Kamble	7 November 2009	11 November 2010	INC
Water Resources; Parliamentary Affairs; Finance; Planning; Energy	Vijay Wadettiwar	7 November 2009	11 November 2010	INC
Urban Development; Forests; Ports; Khar Lands; Parliamentary Affairs; Sports & Youth Welfare; Ex-Servicemen's Welfare	Bhaskar Jadhav	7 November 2009	11 November 2010	NCP
Tribal Development; Labour; Command Area Development	Padmakar Valvi	7 November 2009	11 November 2010	INC
Revenue; Rehabilitation & Relief; Earthquake Rehabilitation; Co-operation; Marketing; Textiles	Prakashdada Solanke	7 November 2009	11 November 2010	NCP
Housing; Industries; Mining; Social Justice; Environment	Sachin Ahir	7 November 2009	11 November 2010	NCP
Food, Civil Supplies & Consumer Protection; Public Works	Abdul Sattar	7 November 2009	11 November 2010	INC
General Administration; Information & Publicity; Cultural Affairs; Protocol; School Education; Women & Child Development; Public Health; Minority Development & Aukaf	Fouzia Khan	7 November 2009	11 November 2010	NCP
Home; Jails; State Excise; Food & Drugs Administration	Ramesh Bagwe	7 November 2009	11 November 2010	INC
Medical Education; Higher & Technical Education; Tourism	Varsha Gaikwad	7 November 2009	11 November 2010	INC
Agriculture; Animal Husbandry, Dairy Development & Fisheries; Water Conservation; Employment Guarantee Scheme; Transport	Gulabrao Deokar	7 November 2009	11 November 2010	NCP

== Ministers by Party ==
Representation of cabinet ministers by party
1. Indian National Congress (54.0%)
2. Nationalist Congress Party (45.9%)

Party	Cabinet Ministers	Ministers of State	Total Ministers
Indian National Congress	11	6	17
Nationalist Congress Party	15	5	20

== Guardian Ministers ==
#	District	Minister	Tenure			Party
1	Ahmednagar	Balasaheb Thorat	7 November 2009	10 November 2010	1 year, 3 days	INC
2	Akola	Subhash Zanak	7 November 2009	10 November 2010	1 year, 3 days	INC
3	Amaravati	Chhagan Bhujbal; Deputy Chief Minister	7 November 2009	10 November 2010	1 year, 3 days	NCP
4	Aurangabad	Radhakrishna Vikhe Patil	7 November 2009	10 November 2010	1 year, 3 days	INC
5	Beed	Subhash Zanak	7 November 2009	10 November 2010	1 year, 3 days	INC
6	Bhandara	Ranjit Kamble	7 November 2009	10 November 2010	1 year, 3 days	INC
7	Buldhana	Suresh Shetty	7 November 2009	10 November 2010	1 year, 3 days	INC
8	Chandrapur	Ramesh Bagwe	7 November 2009	10 November 2010	1 year, 3 days	INC
9	Dhule	Vijay Namdevrao Wadettiwar	7 November 2009	10 November 2010	1 year, 3 days	INC
10	Gadchiroli	R. R. Patil	7 November 2009	10 November 2010	1 year, 3 days	NCP
11	Gondiya	Bhaskar Jadhav	7 November 2009	10 November 2010	1 year, 3 days	NCP
12	Hingoli	Varsha Gaikwad	7 November 2009	10 November 2010	1 year, 3 days	INC
13	Jalgaon	Abdul Sattar	7 November 2009	10 November 2010	1 year, 3 days	INC
14	Jalna	Gulabrao Deokar	7 November 2009	10 November 2010	1 year, 3 days	NCP
15	Kolhapur	Balasaheb Thorat	7 November 2009	10 November 2010	1 year, 3 days	INC
16	Latur	Balasaheb Thorat	7 November 2009	10 November 2010	1 year, 3 days	INC
17	Mumbai City	Jayant Patil	7 November 2009	10 November 2010	1 year, 3 days	NCP
18	Mumbai Suburban	Naseem Khan	7 November 2009	10 November 2010	1 year, 3 days	INC
19	Nagpur	Shivajirao Moghe	7 November 2009	10 November 2010	1 year, 3 days	INC
20	Nanded	Subhash Zanak	7 November 2009	10 November 2010	1 year, 3 days	INC
21	Nandurbar	Vijaykumar Gavit	7 November 2009	10 November 2010	1 year, 3 days	NCP
22	Nashik	Chhagan Bhujbal; Deputy Chief Minister	7 November 2009	10 November 2010	1 year, 3 days	NCP
23	Osmanabad	Rajesh Tope	7 November 2009	10 November 2010	1 year, 3 days	NCP
24	Palghar	Babanrao Pachpute	7 November 2009	10 November 2010	1 year, 3 days	NCP
25	Parbhani	Foujiya Khan	7 November 2009	10 November 2010	1 year, 3 days	NCP
26	Pune	Ajit Pawar	7 November 2009	10 November 2010	1 year, 3 days	NCP
27	Raigad	Sunil Tatkare	7 November 2009	10 November 2010	1 year, 3 days	NCP
28	Ratnagiri	Sunil Tatkare	7 November 2009	10 November 2010	1 year, 3 days	NCP
29	Sangli	Patangrao Kadam	7 November 2009	10 November 2010	1 year, 3 days	INC
30	Satara	Ramraje Naik Nimbalkar	7 November 2009	10 November 2010	1 year, 3 days	NCP
31	Sindhudurg	Narayan Rane	7 November 2009	10 November 2010	1 year, 3 days	INC
32	Solapur	Radhakrishna Vikhe Patil	7 November 2009	10 November 2010	1 year, 3 days	INC
33	Thane	Ganesh Naik	7 November 2009	10 November 2010	1 year, 3 days	NCP
34	Wardha	Narayan Rane	7 November 2009	10 November 2010	1 year, 3 days	INC
35	Washim	Radhakrishna Vikhe Patil	7 November 2009	10 November 2010	1 year, 3 days	INC
36	Yavatmal	Nitin Raut	7 November 2009	10 November 2010	1 year, 3 days	INC
