= Ramkrishna More =

Indian politician

Member of Parliament, Lok Sabha
- In office 1980-1989
- Preceded by: Annasaheb Magar
- Succeeded by: Kisanrao Bankhele
- Constituency: Khed, Maharashtra

Personal details
- Born: 8 November 1947 Bedag Village, Miraj Taluk, Sangli district, Bombay Presidency
- Died: 2 November 2003 (aged 55)
- Party: Indian National Congress
- Spouse: Sulabha
- Children: Dr. Snehal More

Ramkrishna More was an Indian politician. He was elected to the Lok Sabha, the lower house of the Parliament of India as a member of the Indian National Congress.
