= Second Deshmukh ministry =

2004–08 state government in Maharashtra, India

- Ministry of Maharashtra
- Vilasrao Deshmukh, Former Chief Minister of Maharashtra
- Date formed: 1 November 2004
- Date dissolved: 4 December 2008

People and organisations
- Head of state: Governor - Mohammed Fazal (2004); S. M. Krishna (2004-08); S. C. Jamir (2008)
- Head of government: Vilasrao Deshmukh
- No. of ministers: 27 Cabinet ministers Congress (8); NCP (17); Independents (2)
- Member parties: Congress; NCP; Independents
- Status in legislature: Coalition
- Opposition party: Shiv Sena; BJP
- Opposition leader: Legislative Assembly: Narayan Rane (Shiv Sena) (2004-05); Ramdas Kadam (Shiv Sena) (2005-08): Legislative Council: Nitin Gadkari (BJP) (2004-05); Pandurang Fundkar (BJP) (2005-08)

History
- Election: 2004
- Legislature term: 5 years
- Predecessor: Shinde ministry
- Successor: First Ashok Chavan ministry

Vilasrao Deshmukh of the Indian National Congress formed his second Maharashtra government after his party won the 2004 Maharashtra Legislative Assembly elections, in alliance with Nationalist Congress Party. Deshmukh had previously served as the State's Chief Minister from 1999 to 2003.

== List of ministers ==
Deshmukh's initial cabinet included the following members:

Portfolio	Minister	Took office	Left office	Party
Chief Minister: General Administration; Information and Publicity; Information Technology; Cultural Affairs; Urban Development; Law and Judiciary; Revenue; Housing; Planning; Majority Welfare Development; Departments or portfolios not allocated to any minister.	Vilasrao Deshmukh	1 November 2004	4 December 2008	INC
Deputy Chief Minister: Home Affairs	R. R. Patil	1 November 2004	1 December 2008	NCP
Cabinet Minister: Rural Development; Panchayat Raj; Tourism; Socially And Educationally Backward Classes	Vijaysinh Mohite-Patil	9 November 2004	1 December 2008	NCP
Cabinet Minister: Public Works (Excluding Public Undertakings)	Chhagan Bhujbal	9 November 2004	1 December 2008	NCP
Cabinet Minister: Finance; Special Assistance; Special Backward Classes Welfare	Jayant Patil	9 November 2004	1 December 2008	NCP
Cabinet Minister: Industry; Textiles; Mining Department; Marathi Language; Ex. Servicemen Welfare; State Border Defence (First)	Ashok Chavan	9 November 2004	1 December 2008	INC
Cabinet Minister: Earthquake Rehabilitation; Co-operation; Skill Development; Entrepreneurship; Fisheries; Ports Development; Other Backward Bahujan Welfare	Patangrao Kadam	9 November 2004	1 December 2008	INC
Cabinet Minister: Marketing; Employment Guarantee Scheme	Harshvardhan Patil	9 November 2004	1 December 2008	Independent
Cabinet Minister: Excise; Environment; Vimukta Jati	Ganesh Naik	9 November 2004	1 December 2008	NCP
Cabinet Minister: Minority Development and Waqfs; Animal Husbandry; Dairy Development	Anees Ahmed	9 November 2004	1 December 2008	INC
Cabinet Minister: Medical Education; Energy; Other Backward Classes; State Border Defence (Second)	Dilip Walse-Patil	9 November 2004	1 December 2008	NCP
Cabinet Minister: Transport; Mines; Soil and Water Conservation	Surupsingh Hirya Naik	9 November 2004	1 December 2008	INC
Cabinet Minister: Water Resources; (excluding Krishna Valley Corporation): Command Area Development; Water supply; sanitation	Ajit Pawar	9 November 2004	1 December 2008	NCP
Cabinet Minister: Water Resources (Krishna Valley Corporation); Woman and Child Development	Ramraje Naik Nimbalkar	9 November 2004	1 December 2008	NCP
Cabinet Minister: Higher and Technical Education	Suresh Jain	9 November 2004	1 December 2008	NCP
Cabinet Minister: School Education; Sports and Youth Welfare	Vasant Purke	9 November 2004	1 December 2008	INC
Cabinet Minister: Agriculture; Protocol; Employment and Self-employment	Balasaheb Thorat	9 November 2004	1 December 2008	INC
Cabinet Minister: Public Health and Family Welfare	Vimal Mundada	9 November 2004	1 December 2008	NCP
Cabinet Minister: Labour	Nawab Malik	9 November 2004	1 December 2008	NCP
Cabinet Minister: Social Justice; Parliamentary Affairs	Chandrakant Handore	9 November 2004	1 December 2008	INC
Cabinet Minister: Food and Drug Administration	Manohar Naik	9 November 2004	1 December 2008	NCP
Cabinet Minister: Public Works (Including Public Undertakings)	Anil Deshmukh	9 November 2004	1 December 2008	NCP
Cabinet Minister: Food and Civil Supplies; Khar Land Development	Sunil Tatkare	9 November 2004	1 December 2008	NCP
Cabinet Minister: Forest; Disaster Management; Relief & Rehabilitation	Babanrao Pachpute	9 November 2004	1 December 2008	NCP
Cabinet Minister: Non-conventional Energy; Horticulture	Vinay Kore	9 November 2004	1 December 2008	JSS
Cabinet Minister: Tribal Development; Nomadic Tribes	Vijaykumar Krishnarao Gavit	9 November 2004	1 December 2008	NCP

== Guardian Ministers ==
Sr No.	District	Guardian_Minister	Party
01	Ahmednagar	Balasaheb Thorat	United Progressive Alliance
02	Akola	Vimal Mundada	United Progressive Alliance
03	Amravati	Jayant Patil	United Progressive Alliance
04	Aurangabad	Vijaysinh Mohite-Patil	United Progressive Alliance
05	Beed	Nawab Malik	United Progressive Alliance
06	Bhandara	Jayant Patil	United Progressive Alliance
07	Buldhana	Ashok Chavan	United Progressive Alliance
08	Chandrapur	Ashok Chavan	United Progressive Alliance
09	Dhule	Surupsingh Hirya Naik	United Progressive Alliance
10	Gadchiroli	R. R. Patil; Deputy Chief Minister	United Progressive Alliance
11	Gondiya	Patangrao Kadam	United Progressive Alliance
12	Hingoli	Vasant Purke	United Progressive Alliance
13	Jalgaon	Suresh Jain	United Progressive Alliance
14	Jalna	Vijaykumar Krishnarao Gavit	United Progressive Alliance
15	Kolhapur	Patangrao Kadam	United Progressive Alliance
16	Latur	Surupsingh Hirya Naik	United Progressive Alliance
17	Mumbai City	Chhagan Bhujbal	United Progressive Alliance
18	Mumbai Suburban	Chandrakant Handore	United Progressive Alliance
19	Nagpur	Anil Deshmukh	United Progressive Alliance
20	Nanded	Ashok Chavan	United Progressive Alliance
21	Nandurbar	Manohar Naik	United Progressive Alliance
22	Nashik	Chhagan Bhujbal	United Progressive Alliance
23	Osmanabad	Balasaheb Thorat	United Progressive Alliance
24	Palghar	Harshvardhan Patil	United Progressive Alliance
25	Parbhani	Dilip Walse-Patil	United Progressive Alliance
26	Pune	Ajit Pawar	United Progressive Alliance
27	Raigad	Sunil Tatkare	United Progressive Alliance
28	Ratnagiri	Anees Ahmed	United Progressive Alliance
29	Sangli	R. R. Patil; Deputy Chief Minister	United Progressive Alliance
30	Satara	Babanrao Pachpute	United Progressive Alliance
31	Sindhudurg	Vinay Kore	United Progressive Alliance
32	Solapur	Vijaysinh Mohite-Patil	United Progressive Alliance
33	Thane	Ganesh Naik	United Progressive Alliance
34	Wardha	Ganesh Naik	United Progressive Alliance
35	Washim	Anees Ahmed	United Progressive Alliance
36	Yavatmal	Ramraje Naik Nimbalkar	United Progressive Alliance
