= Vijaykumar Krishnarao Gavit =

Indian politician

Cabinet Minister Government of Maharashtra
- In office 14 August 2022 – 26 November 2024
- Minister: Tribal Development
- Governor: Bhagat Singh Koshyari; Ramesh Bais; C. P. Radhakrishnan
- Chief Minister: Eknath Shinde
- Deputy CM: Devendra Fadnavis (First); Ajit Pawar (Second)
- Guardian Minister: NA
- Succeeded by: Prof.Dr. Ashok Uike

Cabinet Minister Government of Maharashtra
- In office 11 November 2010 – 26 September 2014
- Minister: Medical Education Ministry; Horticulture Ministry; Employment Guarantee Ministry
- Governor: K. Sankaranarayanan; Om Prakash Kohli (additional charge); C. Vidyasagar Rao
- Chief Minister: Prithviraj Chavan
- Guardian Minister: NA
- In office 7 November 2009 – 9 November 2010
- Minister: Medical Education Ministry; Horticulture Ministry; Tourism Ministry
- Governor: S. C. Jamir; K. Sankaranarayanan
- Chief Minister: Ashok Chavan
- Guardian Minister: NA
- In office 8 December 2008 – 6 November 2009
- Minister: Tribal Development; Marathi Language Ministry
- Governor: S. C. Jamir
- Chief Minister: Ashok Chavan
- Guardian Minister: NA
- In office 1 November 2004 – 4 December 2008
- Minister: Tribal Development
- Governor: Mohammed Fazal; S. M. Krishna; S. C. Jamir
- Chief Minister: Vilasrao Deshmukh
- Guardian Minister: NA

Minister of State Government of Maharashtra
- In office 1 February 1999 – 17 October 1999
- Minister: Ministry of Public Health (Maharashtra); Ministry of Nomadic Tribes (Maharashtra); Ministry of Higher and Technical Education (Maharashtra)
- Governor: P. C. Alexander
- Chief Minister: Narayan Rane
- Guardian Minister: NA
- Succeeded by: Vishwajeet Kadam
- In office 14 March 1995 – 31 January 1999
- Minister: Ministry of Tribal Development (Maharashtra); Ministry of Labour (Maharashtra); Ministry of Revenue (Maharashtra)
- Governor: P. C. Alexander
- Chief Minister: Manohar Joshi
- Guardian Minister: NA

Member of Maharashtra Legislative Assembly
- Incumbent
- Assumed office 1995
- Preceded by: Valvi Pratap Rubja
- Constituency: Nandurbar

Personal details
- Born: 22 July 1955 (age 70) Nagpur, Maharashtra, India
- Party: Bharatiya Janata Party Since 2014
- Other political affiliations: Nationalist Congress Party Since 1999 Till 2014
- Spouse: Kumudini Gavit
- Children: Heena Gavit; Supriya Gavit
- Education: MBBS; MD. Medicine
- Occupation: Politician

Vijaykumar Gavit is a leader of Bharatiya Janata Party and a member of Maharashtra Legislative Assembly from Nandurbar.

Vijaykumar Gavit was welcomed to the party fold by Leader of Opposition in the Maharashtra Legislative Assembly Eknath Khadse on 6 September 2014.

== Political career ==
Vijaykumar Gavit took oath in the new government which had 18 ministers from the Congress and 20 from NCP, including Deputy Chief Minister Chhagan Bhujbal on 7 November 2009.

== Political Reception ==
As Tribal Development Minister Vijaykumar Gavit admitted in the Maharashtra Legislative Council to the prevalence of bonded labour among tribal children in the state. The opposition accused the government of failing to prevent the practice, although it is legally banned in Maharashtra.

=== Positions held ===
==== Within BJP ====
Vijaykumar Gavit was welcomed to the party fold by Leader of Opposition in the Maharashtra Legislative Assembly Eknath Khadse on 6 September 2014.

==== Legislative ====
- Member, Maharashtra Legislative Assembly - Since 1995
- Minister of state (Maharashtra) of Health and Family Welfare: 1995–1999.
- Minister of state (Maharashtra) of Tribal Affairs: 1999–2004.
- Cabinet Minister of Maharashtra (Minister of Tribal Affairs): 2004–2009.
- Cabinet Minister of Maharashtra (Minister of Medical Education and Food Production): 2009–2014.
- Cabinet Minister of Maharashtra (Minister of Tribal Affairs): 2022
