= First Ashok Chavan ministry =

Indian ministry

- Ministry of Maharashtra
- Date formed: 8 December 2008
- Date dissolved: 6 November 2009

People and organisations
- Head of state: Governor S. C. Jamir
- Head of government: Ashok Chavan
- No. of ministers: 26; Congress (7); NCP (16); Independents (3)
- Member parties: Congress; NCP
- Status in legislature: Coalition
- Opposition party: BJP; Shiv Sena
- Opposition leader: Legislative Assembly: Ramdas Kadam (Shiv Sena): Legislative Council: Pandurang Fundkar (BJP)

History
- Election: 2009
- Legislature term: 5 years
- Predecessor: Second Deshmukh ministry
- Successor: Second Ashok Chavan ministry

Ashok Chavan was sworn in as Chief Minister of Maharashtra for the first time in 2008, after his predecessor, Vilasrao Deshmukh resigned the office in the aftermath of 2008 Mumbai terrorist attacks. The first Chavan ministry governed until the 2009 Maharashtra Legislative Assembly election, which resulted in a victory for Chavan-led Congress-NCP alliance and Chavan forming his second ministry.

== List of ministers ==
The initial Chavan cabinet consisted of 26 cabinet members, including Chavan and his deputy, Chhagan Bhujbal, as well as the following cabinet ministers:

Portfolio	Minister	Took office	Left office	Party
Chief Minister: General Administration; Information and Publicity; Information Technology; Urban Development; Industry; Mining Department; Law and Judiciary; Housing; Departments or portfolios not allocated to any minister.	Ashok Chavan	8 December 2008	6 November 2009	INC
Deputy Chief Minister: Public Works (Excluding Public Undertakings); Tourism; Other Backward Classes	Chhagan Bhujbal	8 December 2008	6 November 2009	NCP
Cabinet Minister: Rural Development; Panchayat Raj; Skill Development; Entrepreneurship; Majority Welfare Development; State Border Defence (First)	R. R. Patil	8 December 2008	6 November 2009	NCP
Cabinet Minister: Finance; Planning; Ex. Servicemen Welfare	Dilip Walse-Patil	8 December 2008	6 November 2009	NCP
Cabinet Minister: Revenue; Sports and Youth Welfare	Patangrao Kadam	8 December 2008	6 November 2009	INC
Cabinet Minister: School Education; State Border Defence (Second)	Radhakrishna Vikhe Patil	8 December 2008	6 November 2009	INC
Cabinet Minister: Home Affairs	Jayant Patil	8 December 2008	6 November 2009	NCP
Cabinet Minister: Water Resources; Water Supply; Sanitation; Command Area Development	Ajit Pawar	8 December 2008	6 November 2009	NCP
Cabinet Minister: Agriculture; Protocol; Soil and Water Conservation; Employment and Self-employment	Balasaheb Thorat	8 December 2008	6 November 2009	INC
Cabinet Minister: Environment; Excise; Special Backward Classes Welfare	Ganesh Naik	8 December 2008	6 November 2009	NCP
Cabinet Minister: Public Works (Including Public Undertakings); Socially Educationally Backward Classes	Vimal Mundada	8 December 2008	6 November 2009	NCP
Cabinet Minister: Public Health and Family Welfare; Vimukta Jati	Rajendra Shingne	8 December 2008	6 November 2009	NCP
Cabinet Minister: Transport; Nomadic Tribes Development; Other Backward Bahujan Welfare	Surupsingh Hirya Naik	8 December 2008	6 November 2009	INC
Cabinet Minister: Cooperation; Cultural Affairs	Harshvardhan Patil	8 December 2008	6 November 2009	Independent
Cabinet Minister: Textiles; Minority Development; Parliamentary Affairs	Anees Ahmed	8 December 2008	6 November 2009	INC
Cabinet Minister: Social Justice	Chandrakant Handore	8 December 2008	6 November 2009	INC
Cabinet Minister: Food and Civil Supplies	Ramesh Bang	8 December 2008	6 November 2009	NCP
Cabinet Minister: Food and Drugs Administration	Manohar Naik	8 December 2008	6 November 2009	NCP
Cabinet Minister: Higher and Technical Education; Medical Education	Rajesh Tope	8 December 2008	6 November 2009	NCP
Cabinet Minister: Labour; Special Assistance	Nawab Malik	8 December 2008	6 November 2009	NCP
Cabinet Minister: Tribal Development; Marathi Language	Vijaykumar Gavit	8 December 2008	6 November 2009	NCP
Cabinet Minister: Energy	Sunil Tatkare	8 December 2008	6 November 2009	NCP
Cabinet Minister: Irrigation (Krishna Valley Corporation); Disaster Management; Relief & Rehabilitation	Ramraje Naik Nimbalkar	8 December 2008	6 November 2009	NCP
Cabinet Minister: Forests; Earthquake Rehabilitation	Babanrao Pachpute	8 December 2008	6 November 2009	NCP
Cabinet Minister: Non-conventional Energy; Horticulture; Employment Guarantee	Vinay Kore	8 December 2008	6 November 2009	JSS
Cabinet Minister: Animal Husbandry; Dairy Development; Fisheries; Ports; Khar Land Development	Ravisheth Patil	8 December 2008	6 November 2009	INC
Cabinet Minister: Forests	Babanrao Pachpute	8 December 2008	6 November 2009	NCP
Cabinet Minister: Marketing; Women and Child Development	Madan Patil	8 December 2008	6 November 2009	Independent

== Guardian Ministers ==
Sr No.	District	Guardian_Minister	Party
01	Ahmednagar	Radhakrishna Vikhe Patil	United Progressive Alliance
02	Akola	Surupsingh Hirya Naik	United Progressive Alliance
03	Amravati	Chandrakant Handore	United Progressive Alliance
04	Aurangabad	Rajesh Tope	United Progressive Alliance
05	Beed	Vimal Mundada	United Progressive Alliance
06	Bhandara	Ramesh Bang	United Progressive Alliance
07	Buldhana	Rajendra Shingne	United Progressive Alliance
08	Chandrapur	Nawab Malik	United Progressive Alliance
09	Dhule	Surupsingh Hirya Naik	United Progressive Alliance
10	Gadchiroli	R. R. Patil	United Progressive Alliance
11	Gondiya	Chhagan Bhujbal; Deputy Chief Minister	United Progressive Alliance
12	Hingoli	Vinay Kore	United Progressive Alliance
13	Jalgaon	Babanrao Pachpute	United Progressive Alliance
14	Jalna	Jayant Patil	United Progressive Alliance
15	Kolhapur	Balasaheb Thorat	United Progressive Alliance
16	Latur	R. R. Patil	United Progressive Alliance
17	Mumbai City	Jayant Patil	United Progressive Alliance
18	Mumbai Suburban	Anees Ahmed	United Progressive Alliance
19	Nagpur	Balasaheb Thorat	United Progressive Alliance
20	Nanded	Anees Ahmed	United Progressive Alliance
21	Nandurbar	Vijaykumar Gavit	United Progressive Alliance
22	Nashik	Chhagan Bhujbal; Deputy Chief Minister	United Progressive Alliance
23	Osmanabad	Ravisheth Patil	United Progressive Alliance
24	Palghar	Nawab Malik	United Progressive Alliance
25	Parbhani	Madan Patil	United Progressive Alliance
26	Pune	Ajit Pawar	United Progressive Alliance
27	Raigad	Sunil Tatkare	United Progressive Alliance
28	Ratnagiri	Ganesh Naik	United Progressive Alliance
29	Sangli	Patangrao Kadam	United Progressive Alliance
30	Satara	Ramraje Naik Nimbalkar	United Progressive Alliance
31	Sindhudurg	Harshvardhan Patil	United Progressive Alliance
32	Solapur	Dilip Walse-Patil	United Progressive Alliance
33	Thane	Ganesh Naik	United Progressive Alliance
34	Wardha	Surupsingh Hirya Naik	United Progressive Alliance
35	Washim	Patangrao Kadam	United Progressive Alliance
36	Yavatmal	Manohar Naik	United Progressive Alliance
