= Sushilkumar Shinde ministry =

2003–04 ministry of Maharashtra, India

- Ministry of Maharashtra

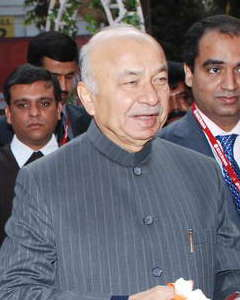
- Sushilkumar Shinde, Former Chief Minister of Maharashtra
- Date formed: 18 January 2003
- Date dissolved: 1 November 2004

People and organisations
- Governor: Mohammed Fazal
- Chief Minister: Sushilkumar Shinde
- Deputy Chief Minister: Chhagan Bhujbal (2003); Vijaysingh Mohite-Patil (2003-04)
- Member parties: Congress; NCP; Other smaller parties and independents
- Status in legislature: Coalition
- Opposition party: Shiv Sena; BJP
- Opposition leader: Narayan Rane (Shiv Sena) (Assembly); Nitin Gadkari (BJP) (Council)

History
- Election: 1999
- Legislature term: 5 years
- Predecessor: Deshmukh I
- Successor: Deshmukh II

Nationalist Congress Party

In January 2003, Sushilkumar Shinde was sworn in as Chief Minister of Maharashtra, on resignation of his predecessor Vilasrao Deshmukh. Shinde led a cabinet consisting of his Congress party and alliance partner NCP, till the 2004 Maharashtra Legislative Assembly election. The Congress-NCP alliance secured a majority in those elections, but the Shinde ministry was replaced by his Deshmukh's second ministry.

== Government formation ==
On his swearing in, Shinde was asked to prove majority support in the Legislative Assembly. Accordingly, on 22 January 2003, the Assembly passed a vote of confidence.

Motion of confidence Sushilkumar Shinde (Congress)
Ballot →	22 January 2003
Required majority →	Simple majority
Yes: • Congress (74); • NCP (56); • CPI(M) (2); • Other parties and Independents (11)	143 / 281
No: • Shiv Sena (69); • Bharatiya Janata Party (55)	133 / 281
Abstentions: • PWPI (5)	5 / 281

== Guardian Ministers ==
Sr No.	District	Guardian_Minister	Party
01	Ahmednagar	Shivajirao Moghe	United Progressive Alliance
02	Akola	Ranjeet Deshmukh	United Progressive Alliance
03	Amravati	Vijaysinh Mohite–Patil DCM	United Progressive Alliance
04	Aurangabad	Ramkrishna More	United Progressive Alliance
05	Beed	Patangrao Kadam	United Progressive Alliance
06	Bhandara	Rohidas Patil	United Progressive Alliance
07	Buldhana	Vikramsinh Patankar	United Progressive Alliance
08	Chandrapur	Rohidas Patil	United Progressive Alliance
09	Dhule	Surupsingh Hirya Naik	United Progressive Alliance
10	Gadchiroli	Patangrao Kadam	United Progressive Alliance
11	Gondiya	Vikramsinh Patankar	United Progressive Alliance
12	Hingoli	Ajit Pawar	United Progressive Alliance
13	Jalgaon	Jayant Patil	United Progressive Alliance
14	Jalna	Chhagan Bhujbal DCM	United Progressive Alliance
15	Kolhapur	Jayant Patil	United Progressive Alliance
16	Latur	Ashok Chavan	United Progressive Alliance
17	Mumbai City	R. R. Patil	United Progressive Alliance
18	Mumbai Suburban	Husain Dalwai	United Progressive Alliance
19	Nagpur	Ranjeet Deshmukh	United Progressive Alliance
20	Nanded	Ashok Chavan	United Progressive Alliance
21	Nandurbar	Vilas Patil	United Progressive Alliance
22	Nashik	Chhagan Bhujbal DCM	United Progressive Alliance
23	Osmanabad	Padamsinh Bajirao Patil	United Progressive Alliance
24	Palghar	Jaywantrao Awale	United Progressive Alliance
25	Parbhani	Satish Chaturvedi	United Progressive Alliance
26	Pune	Ajit Pawar	United Progressive Alliance
27	Raigad	Husain Dalwai	United Progressive Alliance
28	Ratnagiri	Vasant Chavan	United Progressive Alliance
29	Sangli	R. R. Patil	United Progressive Alliance
30	Satara	Surupsingh Hirya Naik	United Progressive Alliance
31	Sindhudurg	Anand Devkate	United Progressive Alliance
32	Solapur	Vijaysinh Mohite–Patil DCM	United Progressive Alliance
33	Thane	Patangrao Kadam	United Progressive Alliance
34	Wardha	Ramkrishna More	United Progressive Alliance
35	Washim	Ganpatrao Deshmukh	United Progressive Alliance
36	Yavatmal	Shivajirao Moghe	United Progressive Alliance

== Ministry ==
The Shinde ministry initially consisted of 16 members, including Shinde. A week after his initial ministers were sworn in, Shinde inducted 53 new members (23 cabinet ministers and 30 ministers of state) and led a 68-member cabinet.

Portfolio	Minister	Took office	Left office	Party
Chief Minister
Chief MinisterPortfolios not allotted to any Minister: General Administration; Planning; Information and Public Relations; Law and Judiciary; Information Technology; Revenue; Agriculture; Command Area Development; Food, Civil Supplies and Consumer Protection; Labour; State Excise; Urban Development; Other Backward Classes(OBC); Socially and Educationally Backward Classes (SEBC); Water Resources	Sushilkumar Shinde	18 January 2003	1 November 2004	Indian National Congress
Deputy Chief Minister
Deputy Chief Minister	Chhagan Bhujbal	18 January 2003	23 December 2003	Nationalist Congress Party
Deputy Chief Minister	Vijaysinh Mohite–Patil	27 December 2003	1 November 2004	Nationalist Congress Party
Cabinet Ministers
Home; State Border Defence (First); Majority Welfare	R. R. Patil	18 January 2003	1 November 2004	Nationalist Congress Party
Co-operation; Marathi Language; Public Health; Industries; Protocol; Sanitation; School Education; Water Supply	Ashok Chavan	18 January 2003	1 November 2004	Indian National Congress
Cultural Affairs; Ex Servicemen Welfare; Higher and Technical Education; Medical Education; Sports and Youth Welfare	Ramkrishna More	18 January 2003	1 November 2004	Indian National Congress
Animal Husbandry Department; Dairy Development (18 January 2003 – 3 March 2004); House Repairs and Reconstruction	Anand Devkate	18 January 2003	1 November 2004	Indian National Congress
Disaster Management; Housing; Slum Improvement; Tribal Development	Satish Chaturvedi	18 January 2003	1 November 2004	Indian National Congress
Earthquake Rehabilitation; Khar Land Development; Relief and Rehabilitation	Vilas Patil	18 January 2003	1 November 2004	Indian National Congress
Tourism; Employment Guarantee; Water Resources (Krishna Valley Development) and (Konkan Valley Development)	Shivajirao Moghe	18 January 2003	1 November 2004	Indian National Congress
Energy; New and Renewable Energy	Patangrao Kadam	18 January 2003	1 November 2004	Indian National Congress
Fisheries; Dairy Development (3 March 2004 – 1 November 2004)	Padamsinh Bajirao Patil	18 January 2003	1 November 2004	Nationalist Congress Party
Food and Drug Administration; Mining	Vasant Chavan	18 January 2003	1 November 2004	Nationalist Congress Party
Finance	Jayant Patil	18 January 2003	1 November 2004	Nationalist Congress Party
Forests; Environment and Climate Change; Special Assistance	Vijaysinh Mohite–Patil	18 January 2003	1 November 2004	Nationalist Congress Party
Horticulture; Rural Development (05 May 2003 - 01 November 2004); Panchayat Raj (05 May 2003 - 01 November 2004)	Ajit Pawar	18 January 2003	1 November 2004	Nationalist Congress Party
Marketing; Rural Development (18 January 2003 - 05 May 2003); Panchayat Raj (18 January 2003 - 05 May 2003); Textiles; Woman and Child Development	Ranjeet Deshmukh	18 January 2003	1 November 2004	Indian National Congress
Minority Development and Aukaf; State Border Defence (Second)	Husain Dalwai	18 January 2003	1 November 2004	Indian National Congress
Public Works (Including Public Undertakings); Nomadic Tribes; Special Backward Classes Welfare	Surupsingh Hirya Naik	18 January 2003	1 November 2004	Indian National Congress
Parliamentary Affairs; Employment and Self-employment	Rohidas Patil	18 January 2003	1 November 2004	Indian National Congress
Public Works (Excluding Public Undertakings); Social Justice; Ports Development	Chhagan Bhujbal	18 January 2003	1 November 2004	Nationalist Congress Party
Skill Development and *Entrepreneurship; Vimukta Jati	Jaywantrao Awale	18 January 2003	1 November 2004	Indian National Congress
Soil and Water Conservation	Ganpatrao Deshmukh	18 January 2003	1 November 2004	Peasants and Workers Party of India
Transport	Vikramsinh Patankar	18 January 2003	1 November 2004	Nationalist Congress Party

Representation of cabinet ministers by party
1. Indian National Congress (60.9%)
2. Nationalist Congress Party (34.8%)
3. Peasants and Workers Party of India (4.35%)

Party	Ministers
Indian National Congress	14
Nationalist Congress Party	08
Peasants and Workers Party of India	01
