= Maharashtra Council of Ministers =

Executive authority of Maharashtra, India

- Emblem of Maharashtra

Agency overview
- Formed: 1 May 1960; 66 years ago
- Type: Highest executive body of the Government of Maharashtra
- Jurisdiction: Republic of India
- Headquarters: Mantralaya, Mumbai
- Agency executives: Devendra Fadnavis, Chair; Eknath Shinde, Deputy Chair; Sunetra Pawar, Deputy Chair
- Child agencies: Cabinet; Ministries of the Government of Maharashtra
- Website: www.maharashtra.gov.in

The Maharashtra Council of Ministers, also called State Cabinet is the principal executive organ of the Government of Maharashtra, which functions as the senior decision-making body of the executive branch. It is chaired by the Chief Minister and consists of the heads of each of the executive government ministries. The council is subject to the Maharashtra Legislature.

A smaller executive body called the State Cabinet is the supreme decision-making body in Maharashtra; it is a subset of the Maharashtra Council of Ministers who hold important portfolios and ministries of the government.

== Ranking ==
There are five categories of the council of ministers as given below, in descending order of rank:

- Chief Minister: Leader of the State Council of Ministers.
- Deputy Chief Minister (if any): Presides as chief minister in his absence or as the senior most cabinet minister.
- Cabinet Minister: A member of the State cabinet; leads a ministry.
- Minister of State (Independent charge): Junior minister not reporting to a Cabinet Minister.
- Minister of State (MoS): Deputy Minister reporting to a Cabinet Minister, usually tasked with a specific responsibility in that ministry.

== Appointment ==
Pursuant to Article 75, a minister who works at the pleasure of the Governor, is appointed by the Governor on the advice of the Chief Minister. Since at least the turn of the millennia, evidence indicates that an MLA's electoral performance enhances the likelihood of being granted a ministerial portfolio.

== Removal ==
- Upon death
- Upon self resignation, or resignation or death of the Chief Minister
- Upon dismissal by the Governor for minister's unconstitutional acts per Article 75(2)
- Upon direction from the Judiciary for committing violation of law
- Upon ceasing eligibility to be a member of Legislature
- Under the provision of "Collective Responsibility" under Article 75, the Chief Minister and the entire Council of Ministers resign if a Vote of No Confidence is passed in the Lower House (Maharashtra Legislative Assembly) of the Maharashtra Legislature

== Council of Ministers in state governments ==
Every state in India is governed by its council of ministers with rules and procedures similar to the union council of ministers per Articles 163, 164 and 167(c).

In March 2020, the Supreme Court of India used its powers for the first time to do "complete justice" under Article 142 of the Indian Constitution to remove a minister functioning in the state of Manipur.

== Council of Ministers ==
The cabinet expansion took place at Raj Bhavan in Nagpur on 15 December 2024. Maharashtra can have a maximum of 43 ministers. 33 were inducted as Cabinet ministers, 6 were sworn in as ministers of state. 19 ministers from the BJP, 11 from the Shiv Sena and 9 from the NCP taken oath as cabinet ministers.

Cabinet ministers portfolios where allocated on 21 December 2024.
Council portfolios are as follows

Update = 31 January 2026

=== Cabinet Ministers ===
| Portfolio | Minister | Took office | Left office | Party |
|---|---|---|---|---|
| Chief Minister: Minister of General Administration; Minister of Home Affairs; Minister of Law & Judiciary; Minister of Information & Public Relations; Minister of Energy (excluding Non-Conventional Energy); Other departments not allocated to any Minister.: Minister of Command Area Development; Earthquake Rehabilitation; Minister of Socially and Educationally Backward Classes; Minister of Vimukta Jati; Minister of Nomadic Tribes; Minister of Special Backward Classes Welfare; Minister of Majority Welfare Development | Devendra Fadnavis | 05 December 2024 | Incumbent | BJP |
| Deputy Chief Minister: Minister of Urban Development; Minister of Housing; Minister of Public Works (Including Public Undertakings) | Eknath Shinde | 05 December 2024 | Incumbent | SHS |
| Deputy Chief Minister | Ajit Pawar | 05 December 2024 | 28 January 2026 | NCP |
| Deputy Chief Minister | Sunetra Pawar | 31 January 2026 | Incumbent | NCP |
| Cabinet Minister: Minister of Finance; Minister of Planning | Ajit Anantrao Pawar (Dy Chief Minister) | 05 December 2024 | 28 January 2026 | NCP |
| Cabinet Minister: Minister of Finance; Minister of Planning | Devendra Fadnavis (Chief Minister) Additional Charge | 28 January 2026 | 31 January 2026 | BJP |
| Cabinet Minister: Minister of Finance; Minister of Planning | Devendra Fadnavis (Chief Minister) | 31 January 2026 | Incumbent | BJP |
| Cabinet Minister: Minister for State Excise | Ajit Anantrao Pawar (Dy Chief Minister) | 05 December 2024 | 28 January 2026 | NCP |
| Cabinet Minister: Minister for State Excise | Devendra Fadnavis (Chief Minister) Additional Charge | 28 January 2026 | 31 January 2026 | BJP |
| Cabinet Minister: Minister for State Excise | Sunetra Pawar (Dy Chief Minister) | 31 January 2026 | Incumbent | NCP |
| Cabinet Minister: Minister of Sports & Youth Welfare; Minister of Minority Development & Aukaf | Dattatray Bharne | 15 December 2024 | 31 July 2025 | NCP |
| Cabinet Minister: Minister of Sports & Youth Welfare; Minister of Minority Development & Aukaf | Manikrao Kokate | 31 July 2025 | 17 December 2025 | NCP |
| Cabinet Minister: Minister of Sports & Youth Welfare; Minister of Minority Development & Aukaf | Ajit Pawar (Dy Chief Minister) | 17 December 2025 | 28 January 2026 | NCP |
| Cabinet Minister: Minister of Sports & Youth Welfare; Minister of Minority Development & Aukaf | Devendra Fadnavis (Chief Minister) Additional Charge | 28 January 2026 | 31 January 2026 | BJP |
| Cabinet Minister: Minister of Sports & Youth Welfare; Minister of Minority Development & Aukaf | Sunetra Pawar (Dy Chief Minister) | 31 January 2026 | Incumbent | NCP |
| Cabinet Minister: Minister of Water Resources (Godavari & Krishna Valley) | Radhakrishna Vikhe Patil | 15 December 2024 | Incumbent | BJP |
| Cabinet Minister: Minister of Revenue | Chandrashekhar Bawankule | 15 December 2024 | Incumbent | BJP |
| Cabinet Minister: Minister of Medical Education | Hasan Mushrif | 15 December 2024 | Incumbent | NCP |
| Cabinet Minister: Minister of Higher & Technical Education; Minister of Parliamentary Affairs | Chandrakant Patil | 15 December 2024 | Incumbent | BJP |
| Cabinet Minister: Minister of Water Resources (Vidharbha, Tapi, Konkan); Minister of Disaster Management | Girish Mahajan | 15 December 2024 | Incumbent | BJP |
| Cabinet Minister: Minister of Water Supply; Sanitation | Gulab Raghunath Patil | 15 December 2024 | Incumbent | SHS |
| Cabinet Minister: Minister of Forest | Ganesh Naik | 15 December 2024 | Incumbent | BJP |
| Cabinet Minister: Minister of School Education | Dadaji Bhuse | 15 December 2024 | Incumbent | SHS |
| Cabinet Minister: Minister of Soil & Water Conservation | Sanjay Rathod | 15 December 2024 | Incumbent | SHS |
| Cabinet Minister: Minister of Food and Civil Supplies; Minister of Consumer Affairs | Dhananjay Munde | 15 December 2024 | 4 March 2025 | NCP |
| Cabinet Minister: Minister of Food and Civil Supplies; Minister of Consumer Affairs | Ajit Pawar | 4 March 2025 | 20 May 2025 | NCP |
| Cabinet Minister: Minister of Food and Civil Supplies; Minister of Consumer Affairs | Chhagan Bhujbal | 20 May 2025 | Incumbent | NCP |
| Cabinet Minister: Minister of Skill Development & Entrepreneurship | Mangal Prabhat Lodha | 15 December 2024 | Incumbent | BJP |
| Cabinet Minister: Minister of Industries; Minister of Marathi Language | Uday Samant | 15 December 2024 | Incumbent | SHS |
| Cabinet Minister: Minister of Marketing; Minister of Protocol | Jayakumar Rawal | 15 December 2024 | Incumbent | BJP |
| Cabinet Minister: Minister of Environment & Climate Change; Minister of Animal Husbandry | Pankaja Munde | 15 December 2024 | Incumbent | BJP |
| Cabinet Minister: Minister for Other Backward Classes; Minister for Other Backward Bahujan Welfare; Minister of Dairy Development; Minister of New and Renewable Energy | Atul Save | 15 December 2024 | Incumbent | BJP |
| Cabinet Minister: Minister of Tribal Development | Ashok Uike | 15 December 2024 | Incumbent | BJP |
| Cabinet Minister: Minister of Tourism; Minister of Mining; Minister of Ex. Servicemen Welfare | Shambhuraj Desai | 15 December 2024 | Incumbent | SHS |
| Cabinet Minister: Minister of Information Technology; Minister of Cultural Affairs | Ashish Shelar | 15 December 2024 | Incumbent | BJP |
| Cabinet Minister: Minister of Woman & Child Development | Aditi Tatkare | 15 December 2024 | Incumbent | NCP |
| Cabinet Minister: Minister of Public Works (Excluding Public Undertakings) | Shivendra Raje Bhosale | 15 December 2024 | Incumbent | BJP |
| Cabinet Minister: Minister of Agriculture | Manikrao Kokate | 15 December 2024 | 31 July 2025 | NCP |
| Cabinet Minister: Minister of Agriculture | Dattatray Bharne | 31 July 2025 | Incumbent | NCP |
| Cabinet Minister: Minister of Rural Development; Minister of Panchayat Raj | Jaykumar Gore | 15 December 2024 | Incumbent | BJP |
| Cabinet Minister: Minister of Food & Drug Administration; Minister of Special Assistance | Narhari Zirwal | 15 December 2024 | Incumbent | NCP |
| Cabinet Minister: Minister of Textiles | Sanjay Savkare | 15 December 2024 | Incumbent | BJP |
| Cabinet Minister: Minister of Social Justice | Sanjay Shirsat | 15 December 2024 | Incumbent | SHS |
| Cabinet Minister: Minister of Transport | Pratap Sarnaik | 15 December 2024 | Incumbent | SHS |
| Cabinet Minister: Minister of Horticulture; Minister of Employment Guarantee; Minister of Khar Land Development | Bharatshet Gogawale | 15 December 2024 | Incumbent | SHS |
| Cabinet Minister: Minister of Relief & Rehabilitation | Makrand Jadhav - Patil | 15 December 2024 | Incumbent | NCP |
| Cabinet Minister: Minister of Fisheries; Minister of Ports Development | Nitesh Rane | 15 December 2024 | Incumbent | BJP |
| Cabinet Minister: Minister of Labour | Akash Fundkar | 15 December 2024 | Incumbent | BJP |
| Cabinet Minister: Minister of Co-operation | Babasaheb Patil | 15 December 2024 | Incumbent | NCP |
| Cabinet Minister: Minister of Public Health and Family Welfare | Prakashrao Abitkar | 15 December 2024 | Incumbent | SHS |
| Cabinet Minister: Minister of Disability Welfare | Devendra Fadnavis; Chief Minister Additional Charge | 15 December 2024 | 15 December 2024 | BJP |
| Cabinet Minister: Minister of Disability Welfare | Atul Save | 15 December 2024 | Incumbent | BJP |
| Cabinet Minister Minister for State Border Defence | Devendra Fadnavis; Chief Minister Additional Charge | 15 December 2024 | 13 February 2025 | BJP |
| Cabinet Minister Minister for State Border Defence | Chandrakant Patil (First) | 13 February 2025 | Incumbent | BJP |
| Cabinet Minister Minister for State Border Defence | Shambhuraj Desai (Second) | 13 February 2025 | Incumbent | BJP |

=== Ministers of State ===
| Portfolio | Minister | Took office | Left office | Party |
|---|---|---|---|---|
| Minister of State: Urban Development; Transport; Social Justice; Medical Education; Minority Development and Aukaf | Madhuri Misal | 15 December 2024 | Incumbent | BJP |
| Minister of State: Finance; Planning; Agriculture; Relief and Rehabilitation; Law and Judiciary; Labour | Ashish Jaiswal | 15 December 2024 | Incumbent | SHS |
| Minister of State: Home Affairs (Rural); Housing; School Education; Co-operation; Mining | Pankaj Bhoyar | 15 December 2024 | Incumbent | BJP |
| Minister of State: Water Supply; Sanitation; Public Health and Family Welfare; Energy; New and Renewable Energy; Woman and Child Development; Public Works (Including Public Undertakings) | Meghana Bordikar | 15 December 2024 | Incumbent | BJP |
| Minister of State: Industries; Public Works (excluding Public Undertakings); Higher Education and Technical Education; Tribal Development; Tourism; Soil and Water Conservation | Indranil Naik | 15 December 2024 | Incumbent | NCP |
| Minister of State: Home Affairs (Urban); Revenue; Rural Development; Panchayat Raj; Food and Civil Supplies; Consumer Affairs; Food and Drug Administration | Yogesh Kadam | 15 December 2024 | Incumbent | SHS |
| Minister of State: General Administration; Information Technology; Information and Public Relations; Environment and climate change; Ex. Servicemen Welfare; Majority Welfare Development; Earthquake Rehabilitation; Khar land Development; Disability Welfare; Socially and Educationally Backward Classes; Vimukta Jati; Nomadic Tribes; Special Backward Classes Welfare; Water Resources; Command Area Development; Protocol; Animal Husbandry; Dairy Development; Forests Department; Cultural Affairs; Fisheries Department; Textiles; Parliamentary Affairs; Employment Guarantee; Horticulture; Marketing; Marathi Language; Other Backward Classes; Other Backward Bahujan Welfare; State Excise; State Border Defence; Skill Development And Entrepreneurship; Special Assistance; Sports and Youth Welfare; Ports Development; Disaster Management | Departments have not been assigned to the Any Minister of State | 15 December 2024 | Incumbent | Independence politician |

== Oath as the state chief minister/minister ==
I, <Name of Chief Minister/Minister>, do swear in the name of God/solemnly affirm that I will bear true faith and allegiance to the Constitution of India as by law established, that I will uphold the sovereignty and integrity of India, that I will faithfully and conscientiously discharge my duties as a Minister for the State of () and that I will do right to all manner of people in accordance with the Constitution and the law without fear or favour, affection or ill-will.
