= Ministry of Disability Welfare (Maharashtra) =

Indian government ministry responsible for affirmative action

Ministry of Disability Welfare Government of Maharashtra
- मंत्रालय दिव्यांग कल्याण विभाग, महाराष्ट्र शासन
- Seal of the state of Maharashtra

- Building of Administrative Headquarters of Mumbai

Ministry overview
- Formed: 09 January 2023
- Jurisdiction: (India) Maharashtra
- Headquarters: Mantralay, Mumbai
- Annual budget: State Budget of Maharashtra
- Minister responsible: Atul Save, Cabinet Minister
- Deputy Minister responsible: Vacant, TBD since 09 January 2023, Minister of State
- Ministry executive: Tukaram Mundhe (IAS)
- Parent department: Government of Maharashtra
- Website: sjsa.maharashtra.gov.in/en

The Ministry of Disability Welfare is the ministry in the Government of Maharashtra which was carved out of the Ministry of Social Justice (Maharashtra) and created on 9 January 2023.

The Ministry is headed by a cabinet level minister. Atul Save is current and Minister of Disability Welfare.

== Head office ==
Minister of Disability Welfare मंत्री दिव्यांग कल्याण विभाग महाराष्ट्र शासन
- Emblem of India

- Flag of India
- Incumbent; Atul Save since 23 May 2025
- Ministry of Disability Welfare (Maharashtra)
- Style: The Honourable
- Abbreviation: Cabinet Minister
- Member of: State Cabinet
- Reports to: Chief Minister, Maharashtra Legislature
- Seat: Mantralaya, Mumbai
- Appointer: Governor on the advice of the Chief Minister
- Term length: 5 years
- Inaugural holder: Eknath Shinde
- Formation: 09 January 2023
- Deputy: Vacant, TBD; since 09 January 2023

== Cabinet Ministers ==
No.	Portrait	Minister (Constituency)	Term of office			Political party	Ministry	Chief Minister
No.	Portrait	Minister (Constituency)	From	To	Period	Political party	Ministry	Chief Minister
Minister of Disability Welfare
01		Eknath Shinde (MLA for Kopri-Pachpakhadi Constituency No. 147- Thane District) (Legislative Assembly) (Chief Minister)	09 January 2023	26 November 2024	1 year, 322 days	Shiv Sena (2022–present)	Eknath	Eknath Shinde
02		Devendra Fadnavis (MLA for Nagpur South West Constituency No. 52- Nagpur District) (Legislative Assembly) (Chief_Minister); In Charge	05 December 2024	23 May 2025	169 days	Bharatiya Janata Party	Fadnavis III	Devendra Fadnavis
03		Atul Save (MLA for Aurangabad East Constituency No. 109- Chhatrapati Sambhaji Nagar District Also Previously Known Aurangabad District (Legislative Assembly)	23 May 2025	Incumbent	1 year, 108 days	Bharatiya Janata Party	Fadnavis III	Devendra Fadnavis

== Ministers of State ==
No.	Portrait	Deputy Minister (Constituency)	Term of office			Political party	Ministry	Minister	Chief Minister
No.	Portrait	Deputy Minister (Constituency)	From	To	Period	Political party	Ministry	Minister	Chief Minister
Deputy Minister of Disability Welfare
Vacant			09 January 2023	26 November 2024	1 year, 322 days	NA	Eknath	Eknath Shinde	Eknath Shinde
Vacant			21 December 2024	incumbent	1 year, 261 days	NA	Fadnavis III	Devendra Fadnavis (2024 – 2025); Atul Save (2025 – Present)	Devendra Fadnavis

== Chairperson ==
Chairperson of the Divyang Welfare Committee Government of Maharashtra

No.	Portrait	Chairperson	Rank	Legislature / Parliament Post	Term of office			Political party	Ministry	Minister	Chief Minister (Appointed)
No.	Portrait	Chairperson	Rank	Legislature / Parliament Post	From	To	Period	Political party	Ministry	Minister	Chief Minister (Appointed)
Chairperson of Disability Welfare
01		Bachchu Kadu	Cabinet Minister Rank	(MLA for Achalpur Constituency No. 42- Amravati District) (Legislative Assembly)	25 May 2023	26 November 2024	1 year, 185 days	Prahar Janshakti Party	Eknath	Eknath Shinde	Eknath Shinde
