= Ministry of Environment and Climate Change (Maharashtra) =

Government department of Maharashtra, India

Ministry of Environment and Climate Change, Government of Maharashtra
- मंत्रालय पर्यावरण आणि हवामान बदल विभाग, महाराष्ट्र शासन
- Seal of the state of Maharashtra

- Building of Administrative Headquarters of Mumbai

Ministry overview
- Jurisdiction: (India) Maharashtra
- Headquarters: Mantralay, Mumbai
- Minister responsible: Pankaja Munde, Cabinet Minister
- Deputy Minister responsible: Vacant, TBD since 29 June 2022, Minister of State
- Ministry executive: (IAS)
- Parent department: Government of Maharashtra
- Website: envd.maharashtra.gov.in/default.aspx

The Ministry of Environment is a ministry of the Government of Maharashtra. The ministry is responsible for promoting environmental issues in Maharashtra.

The Ministry is headed by a cabinet level minister. Pankaja Munde is current Minister of Environment and Climate Change.

== Head office ==
Minister of Environment and Climate Change मंत्री पर्यावरण आणि हवामान बदल
- Emblem of India

- Flag of India

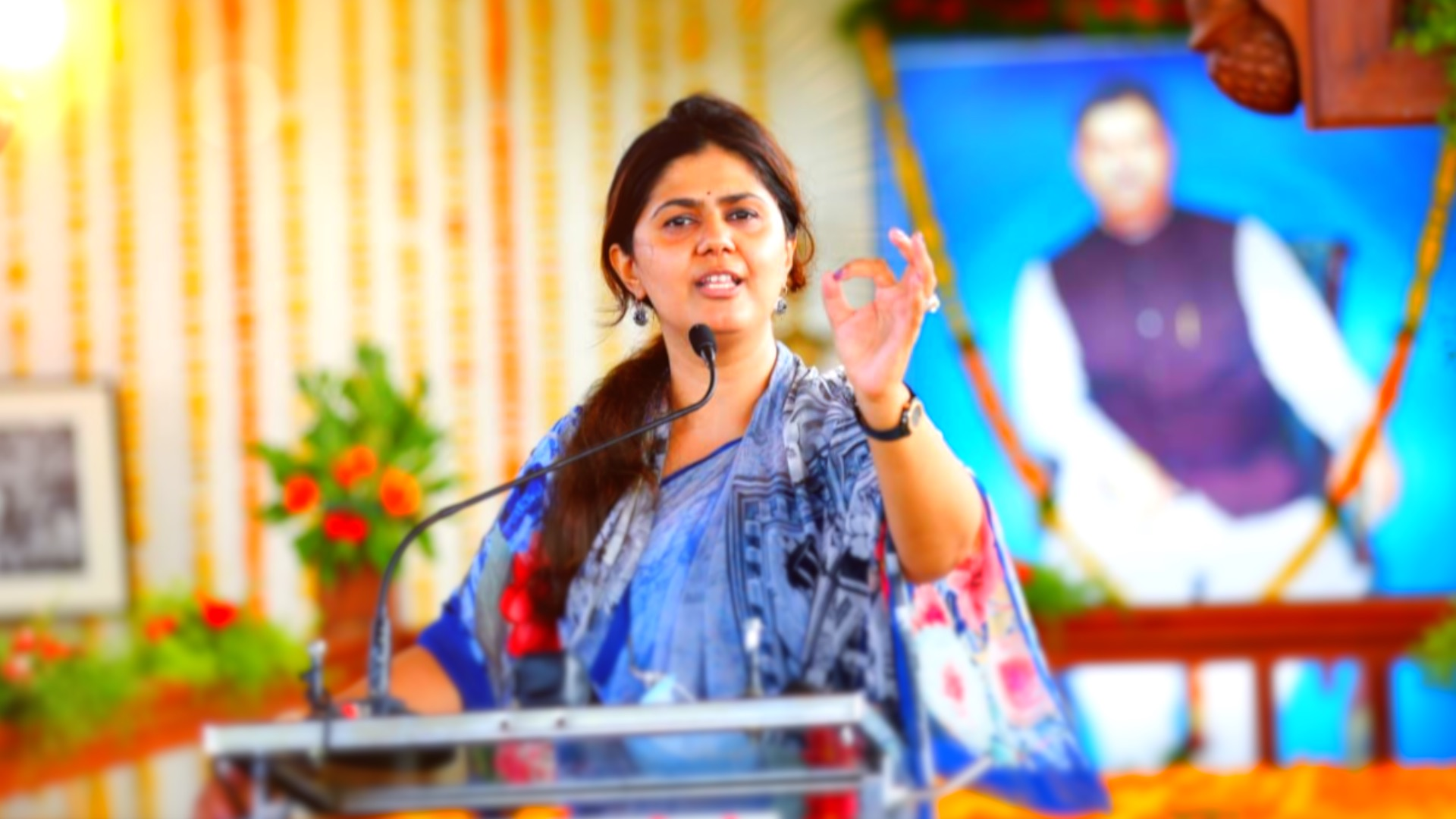
- Incumbent; Pankaja Munde since 21 December 2024
- Ministry of Environment and Climate Change
- Style: The Honourable
- Abbreviation: Cabinet Minister
- Member of: State Cabinet
- Reports to: Chief Minister, Maharashtra Legislature
- Seat: Mantralaya, Mumbai
- Appointer: Governor on the advice of the Chief Minister
- Term length: 5 years
- Precursor: Devendra Fadnavis (2024-2024)
- Inaugural holder: Balasaheb Desai (1960-1962)
- Formation: 1 May 1960
- Deputy: Sanjay Bansode

== Cabinet Ministers ==
No.	Portrait	Minister (Constituency)	Term of office			Political party	Ministry	Chief Minister
No.	Portrait	Minister (Constituency)	From	To	Period	Political party	Ministry	Chief Minister
Minister of Environment and Climate Change
01		Balasaheb Desai (MLA for Patan Constituency No. 261- Satara District) (Legislative Assembly)	01 May 1960	07 March 1962	1 year, 310 days	Indian National Congress	Yashwantrao I	Yashwantrao Chavan
02		Vasantrao Naik (MLA for Pusad Constituency No. 81- Yavatmal District) (Legislative Assembly)	08 March 1962	19 November 1962	256 days	Indian National Congress	Yashwantrao II	Yashwantrao Chavan
03		Gopalrao Bajirao Khedkar (MLA for Akot Constituency No. 28- Akola District) (Legislative Assembly)	20 November 1962	24 November 1963	1 year, 4 days	Indian National Congress	Kannamwar l	Marotrao Kannamwar
04		P. K. Sawant (MLA for Chiplun Constituency No. 265- Ratnagiri District) (Legislative Assembly) (Interim Chief Minister)	25 November 1962	04 December 1963	9 days	Indian National Congress	Sawant I	P. K. Sawant
05		Sadashiv Govind Barve (MLA for Shivajinagar Constituency No. 209- Pune District) (Legislative Assembly)	05 December 1963	01 March 1967	3 years, 86 days	Indian National Congress	Vasantrao I	Vasantrao Naik
06		Keshavrao Sonawane (MLA for Ausa Constituency No. 239- Latur District) (Legislative Assembly)	01 March 1967	27 October 1969	2 years, 240 days	Indian National Congress	Vasantrao II	Vasantrao Naik
07		Gopalrao Bajirao Khedkar (MLA for Akot Constituency No. 28- Akola District) (Legislative Assembly)	27 October 1969	13 March 1972	2 years, 138 days	Indian National Congress	Vasantrao II	Vasantrao Naik
08		Pratibha Patil (MLA for Jalgaon City Constituency No. 13- Jalgaon District) (Legislative Assembly)	13 March 1972	17 Match; 1974	2 years, 4 days	Indian National Congress	Vasantrao III	Vasantrao Naik
09		Madhukar Dhanaji Chaudhari (MLA for Raver Constituency No. 11- Jalgaon District) (Legislative Assembly)	17 Match; 1974	21 February 1975	341 days	Indian National Congress	Vasantrao III	Vasantrao Naik
10		Sharad Pawar (MLA for Baramati Constituency No. 201- Pune District) (Legislative Assembly)	21 February 1975	17 May 1977	2 years, 85 days	Indian National Congress	Shankarrao I	Shankarrao Chavan
11		Vasantdada Patil (MLC for Elected by MLAs Constituency No. 20 - Sangli District) (Legislative Council) (Chief Minister)	17 May 1977	07 March 1978	1 year, 294 days	Indian National Congress	Vasantdada I	Vasantdada Patil
12		Purushottam Dekate (MLA for Umred Constituency No. 51- Nagpur District (Legislative Assembly)	07 March 1978	18 July 1978	133 days	Indian National Congress (U)	Vasantdada II	Vasantdada Patil
13		Pramila Tople (MLA for Akola Constituency No. 15- Akola District (Legislative Assembly)	18 July 1978	17 February 1980	1 year, 214 days	Indian Congress (Socialist)	Pawar I	Sharad Pawar
14		Narendra Mahipati Tidke (MLA for Savner Constituency No. 49- Nagpur District) (Legislative Assembly)	09 June 1980	21 January 1982	1 year, 226 days	Indian National Congress	Antulay	Abdul Rahman Antulay
15		Babasaheb Bhosale (MLA for Nehrunagar Constituency No. 172- Mumbai Suburban District) (Legislative Assembly) (Chief Minister)	21 January 1982	02 February 1983	1 year, 12 days	Indian National Congress	Bhosale	Babasaheb Bhosale
16		Vasantdada Patil (MLA for Sangli Constituency No. 282- Sangli District) (Legislative Assembly) (Chief Minister)	07 February 1983	05 March 1985	2 years, 26 days	Indian National Congress	Vasantdada III	Vasantdada Patil
17		Vasantdada Patil (MLA for Sangli Constituency No. 282- Sangli District) (Legislative Assembly) (Chief Minister)	12 March 1985; 1960	03 June 1985; 1962	83 days	Indian National Congress	Vasantdada IV	Vasantdada Patil
19		Sushilkumar Shinde (MLA for Solapur City Central Constituency No. 249- Solapur District) (Legislative Assembly)	03 June 1985	12 March 1986	282 days	Indian National Congress	Nilangekar	Shivajirao Patil Nilangekar
20		V. Subramanian (MLA for South Mumbai Constituency No. 121- Mumbai City District) (Legislative Assembly)	12 March 1986	26 June 1988	2 years, 106 days	Indian National Congress	Shankarrao II	Shankarrao Chavan
21		Abhaysinh Raje Bhosale (MLA for Satara Constituency No. 262- Satara District (Legislative Assembly)	26 June 1988	03 March 1990	1 year, 250 days	Indian National Congress	Pawar II	Sharad Pawar
22		Sharad Pawar (MLA for Baramati Constituency No. 201- Pune District) (Legislative Assembly) (Chief Minister)	04 March 1990	25 January 1991	327 days	Indian National Congress	Pawar III	Sharad Pawar
23		Jawaharlal Darda (MLC for Elected by MLAs Constituency No. 19 - Yavatmal District) (Legislative Council)	25 January 1991	25 June 1991	151 days	Indian National Congress	Pawar III	Sharad Pawar
24		Jawaharlal Darda (MLC for Elected by MLAs Constituency No. 19 - Yavatmal District) (Legislative Council)	25 June 1991	22 February 1993	1 year, 242 days	Indian National Congress	Sudhakarrao	Sudhakarrao Naik
25		Vilasrao Deshmukh (MLA for Latur City Constituency No. 235- Latur District) (Legislative Assembly)	06 March 1993	14 March 1995	2 years, 8 days	Indian National Congress	Pawar IV	Sharad Pawar
26		Ganesh Naik (MLA for Belapur Constituency No. 151- Thane District) (Legislative Assembly)	14 March 1995	31 January 1999	3 years, 323 days	Shiv Sena	Joshi	Manohar Joshi
27		Radhakrishna Vikhe Patil (MLA for Shirdi Constituency No. 218- Ahmednagar District) (Legislative Assembly)	01 February 1999	11 May 1999	99 days	Shiv Sena	Rane	Narayan Rane
28		Chandrakant Khaire (MLA for Aurangabad West Constituency No. 108- Chhatrapati Sambhaji Nagar District Also Previously Known Aurangabad District (Legislative Assembly)	11 May 1999	17 October 1999	159 days	Shiv Sena	Rane	Narayan Rane
29		Surupsingh Hirya Naik (MLA for Navapur Constituency No. 04- Nandurbar District) (Legislative Assembly)	19 October 1999	16 January 2003	3 years, 88 days	Indian National Congress	Deshmukh I	Vilasrao Deshmukh
30		Vijaysinh Mohite–Patil (MLA for Malshiras Constituency No. 254- Solapur District) (Legislative Assembly)	18 January 2003	01 November 2004	1 year, 295 days	Nationalist Congress Party	Sushilkumar	Sushilkumar Shinde
31		Ganesh Naik (MLA for Belapur Constituency No. 151- Thane District) (Legislative Assembly)	09 November 2004	01 December 2007	4 years, 22 days	Nationalist Congress Party	Deshmukh II	Vilasrao Deshmukh
32		Ganesh Naik (MLA for Belapur Constituency No. 151- Thane District) (Legislative Assembly)	08 December 2008	06 November 2009	333 days	Nationalist Congress Party	Ashok I	Ashok Chavan
33		Jayant Patil (MLA for Islampur Constituency No. 283- Sangli District) (Legislative Assembly)	07 November 2009	10 November; 201p	1 year, 3 days	Nationalist Congress Party	Ashok II	Ashok Chavan
34		Sanjay Deotale (MLA for Warora Constituency No. 75- Chandrapur District (Legislative Assembly)	11 November 2010	26 September 2014	3 years, 319 days	Indian National Congress	Prithviraj	Prithviraj Chavan
35		Eknath Khadse (MLA for Muktainagar Constituency No. 20- Jalgaon District) (Legislative Assembly)	31 October 2014	04 December 2014	34 days	Bharatiya Janata Party	Fadnavis I	Devendra Fadnavis
36		Ramdas Kadam (MLC for Mumbai Local Authorities No. 02 - Mumbai Suburban District) (Legislative Council)	04 December 2014	12 November 2019	4 years, 343 days	Shiv Sena	Fadnavis I	Devendra Fadnavis
37		Devendra Fadnavis (MLA for Nagpur South West Constituency No. 52- Nagpur District) (Legislative Assembly) (Chief Minister) (In Charge)	23 November 2019	28 November 2019	5 days	Bharatiya Janata Party	Fadnavis II	Devendra Fadnavis
38		Eknath Shinde (MLA for Kopri-Pachpakhadi Constituency No. 147- Thane District) (Legislative Assembly)	28 November 2019	30 December 2019	32 days	Shiv Sena	Thackeray	Uddhav Thackeray
39		Aaditya Thackeray (MLA for Worli Constituency No. 182- Mumbai City District (Legislative Assembly)	30 December 2019	29 June 2022	2 years, 181 days	Shiv Sena	Thackeray	Uddhav Thackeray
40		Eknath Shinde (MLA for Kopri-Pachpakhadi Constituency No. 147- Thane District) (Legislative Assembly) (Chief Minister) (In Charge)	30 June 2022	14 August 2022	45 days	Shiv Sena (2022–present)	Eknath	Eknath Shinde
41		Eknath Shinde (MLA for Kopri-Pachpakhadi Constituency No. 147- Thane District) (Legislative Assembly) (Chief Minister)	14 August 2022	26 November 2024	2 years, 104 days	Shiv Sena (2022–present)	Eknath	Eknath Shinde
42		Devendra Fadnavis (MLA for Nagpur South West Constituency No. 52- Nagpur District) (Legislative Assembly) (Chief_Minister); In Charge	05 December 2024	21 December 2024	16 days	Bharatiya Janata Party	Fadnavis III	Devendra Fadnavis
43		Pankaja Munde (MLC for Elected by MLAs Constituency No. 01 - Beed District) (Legislative Council)	21 December 2024	Incumbent	1 year, 261 days	Bharatiya Janata Party	Fadnavis III	Devendra Fadnavis

== Ministers of State ==
No.	Portrait	Deputy Minister (Constituency)	Term of office			Political party	Ministry	Minister	Chief Minister
No.	Portrait	Deputy Minister (Constituency)	From	To	Period	Political party	Ministry	Minister	Chief Minister
Deputy Minister of Environment and climate change
The Post of Deputy Minister / Minister of States has been kept Vacant from 23 November 2019 To 28 November 2019			23 November 2019	28 November 2019	5 days	NA	Fadnavis II	Devendra Fadnavis	Devendra Fadnavis
01		Sanjay Bansode (MLA for Udgir Constituency No. 237- Latur District) (Legislative Assembly)	30 December 2019	29 June 2022	2 years, 181 days	Nationalist Congress Party	Thackeray	Aaditya Thackeray	Uddhav Thackeray
The Post of Deputy Minister / Minister of States has been kept Vacant from 30 June 2022			30 June 2022	26 November 2024	2 years, 149 days	NA	Eknath	Eknath Shinde	Eknath Shinde
Vacant			21 December 2024	incumbent	1 year, 261 days	NA	Fadnavis III	Pankaja Munde (2024 – Present)	Devendra Fadnavis

== History ==
Ministry of Environment was renamed as Ministry of Environment and Climate Change in 2020.

== Maharashtra Pollution Control Board ==
Maharashtra Pollution Control Board (MPCB) is execution wing of the ministry.
MPCB is responsible for implementation of -

- Water (Prevention and Control of Pollution) Act, 1974
- Air (Prevention and Control of Pollution) Act, 1981
- Water (Cess) Act, 1977
- Few provisions under Environmental (Protection) Act, 1986
- Biomedical Waste (M&H) Rules, 1998,
- Hazardous Waste (M&H) Rules, 2000,
- Municipal Solid Waste Rules, 2000 etc.

MPCB is an ISO 9000 and ISO 27001 certified organization.

=== Composition of the MPCB ===
As per provisions of section 4 of the Water (P&CP) Act, 1974 and section 5 of Air (P&CP) Act, 1981), board consists of:

1. Chairman,
2. Member Secretary
3. Official and Non-Official Members
