= Ministry of Earthquake Rehabilitation (Maharashtra) =

Maharashtra government ministry responsible for Earthquake Rehabilitation

Ministry of Earthquake Rehabilitation Government of Maharashtra
- मंत्रालय भूकंप पुनर्वसन विभाग, महाराष्ट्र शासन
- Seal of the state of Maharashtra

- Building of Administrative Headquarters of Mumbai

Ministry overview
- Jurisdiction: (India) Maharashtra
- Headquarters: Mantralay, Mumbai
- Minister responsible: Devendra Fadnavis, Chief Minister of Maharashtra
- Deputy Minister responsible: Vacant, TBD since 29 June 2022, Minister of State
- Ministry executive: (IAS)
- Parent department: Government of Maharashtra

The Ministry of Earthquake Rehabilitation is a Ministry of the Government of Maharashtra.

The Ministry is headed by a cabinet level Minister. Devendra Fadnavis is Current Chief Minister of Maharashtra and Minister of Earthquake Rehabilitation Government of Maharashtra.

== Head office ==
Minister of Earthquake Rehabilitation मंत्री भूकंप पुनर्वसन विभाग
- Emblem of India

- Flag of India
- Incumbent; Devendra Fadnavis; Chief Minister since 05 December 2024
- Ministry of Earthquake Rehabilitation (Maharashtra)
- Style: The Honourable
- Abbreviation: Cabinet Minister
- Member of: State Cabinet
- Reports to: Chief Minister, Maharashtra Legislature
- Seat: Mantralaya, Mumbai
- Appointer: Governor on the advice of the Chief Minister
- Term length: 5 years
- Precursor: Vijay Namdevrao Wadettiwar; (2019- 2022)
- Inaugural holder: D. S. Palaspagar (1960-1962)
- Formation: 1 May 1960
- Deputy: Vacant, TBD; since 29 June 2022

== Cabinet Ministers ==
No.	Portrait	Minister (Constituency)	Term of office			Political party	Ministry	Chief Minister
No.	Portrait	Minister (Constituency)	From	To	Period	Political party	Ministry	Chief Minister
Minister of Earthquake Rehabilitation
01		Homi J. H. Taleyarkhan (MLC for Elected by MLAs Constituency No. 22 - Mumbai Suburban District) (Legislative Council)	01 May 1960	07 March 1962	1 year, 310 days	Indian National Congress	Yashwantrao I	Yashwantrao Chavan
02		D. S. Palaspagar (MLC for Elected by MLAs Constituency No. 19 - Bhandara District) (Legislative Council)	08 March 1962	19 November 1962	256 days	Indian National Congress	Yashwantrao II	Yashwantrao Chavan
03		Keshavrao Sonawane (MLA for Latur Constituency No. 235- Latur District) (Legislative Assembly)	20 November 1962	24 November 1963	1 year, 4 days	Indian National Congress	Kannamwar l	Marotrao Kannamwar
04		Parashuram Krishnaji Sawant (MLA for Chiplun Constituency No. 265- Ratnagiri District) (Legislative Assembly) (Interim Chief Minister)	25 November 1962	04 December 1963	9 days	Indian National Congress	Sawant	Parashuram Krishnaji Sawant
05		Narendra Mahipati Tidke (MLA for Savner Constituency No. 49- Nagpur District) (Legislative Assembly)	05 December 1963	01 March 1967	3 years, 86 days	Indian National Congress	Vasantrao I	Vasantrao Naik
06		Madhukarrao Dhanaji Chaudhari (MLA for Raver Constituency No. 11- Jalgaon District) (Legislative Assembly)	01 March 1967	27 October 1969	2 years, 240 days	Indian National Congress	Vasantrao II	Vasantrao Naik
07		Shankarrao Chavan (MLA for Bhokar Constituency No. 85- Nanded District) (Legislative Assembly)	27 October 1969	13 March 1972	2 years, 138 days	Indian National Congress	Vasantrao II	Vasantrao Naik
08		Abdul Rahman Antulay (MLA for Shrivardhan Constituency No. 193- Raigad District) (Legislative Assembly)	13 March 1972	04 April 1973	1 year, 32 days	Indian National Congress	Vasantrao III	Vasantrao Naik
09		Vasantdada Patil (MLA for Sangli Constituency No. 282- Sangli District) (Legislative Assembly)	04 April 1973	17 Match; 1974	347 days	Indian National Congress	Vasantrao III	Vasantrao Naik
10		Shankarrao Chavan (MLA for Bhokar Constituency No. 85- Nanded District) (Legislative Assembly)	17 Match; 1974	21 February 1975	341 days	Indian National Congress	Vasantrao III	Vasantrao Naik
11		Shankarrao Chavan (MLA for Bhokar Constituency No. 85- Nanded District) (Legislative Assembly) (Chief Minister)	21 February 1975	16 April 1977	2 years, 54 days	Indian National Congress	Shankarrao I	Shankarrao Chavan
12		Yashwantrao Mohite (MLA for Karad South Constituency No. 260- Satara District) (Legislative Assembly)	17 April 1977	07 March 1978	1 year, 324 days	Indian National Congress	Vasantdada I	Vasantdada Patil
13		Nashikrao Tirpude (MLA for Bhandara Constituency No. 61- Bhandara District) (Legislative Assembly) (Deputy Chief Minister)	07 March 1978	18 July 1978	133 days	Indian National Congress (Indira)	Vasantdada II	Vasantdada Patil
14		Ganpatrao Deshmukh (MLA for Sangola Constituency No. 235- Solapur District (Legislative Assembly)	18 July 1978	19 November 1979	1 year, 124 days	Peasants and Workers Party of India	Pawar I	Sharad Pawar
15		Abdul Rahman Antulay (MLA for Shrivardhan Constituency No. 193- Raigad District) (Legislative Assembly) (Chief Minister)	09 June 1980	21 January 1982	1 year, 226 days	Indian National Congress	Antulay	Abdul Rahman Antulay
16		Narendra Mahipati Tidke (MLA for Savner Constituency No. 49- Nagpur District) (Legislative Assembly)	21 January 1982	02 February 1983	1 year, 12 days	Indian National Congress	Bhosale	Babasaheb Bhosale
17		Vasantdada Patil (MLA for Sangli Constituency No. 282- Sangli District) (Legislative Assembly) (Chief Minister)	07 February 1983	05 March 1985	2 years, 26 days	Indian National Congress	Vasantdada III	Vasantdada Patil
18		Sudhakarrao Naik (MLA for Pusad Constituency No. 81- Yavatmal District) (Legislative Assembly)	12 March 1985	03 June 1985	83 days	Indian National Congress	Vasantdada IV	Vasantdada Patil
19		Shivajirao Patil Nilangekar (MLA for Nilanga Constituency No. 238- Latur District) (Legislative Assembly) (Chief Minister)	03 June 1985	12 March 1986	282 days	Indian National Congress	Nilangekar	Shivajirao Patil Nilangekar
20		V. Subramanian (MLA for South Mumbai Constituency No. 121- Mumbai City District) (Legislative Assembly)	12 March 1986	26 June 1988	2 years, 106 days	Indian National Congress	Shankarrao II	Shankarrao Chavan
21		Padamsinh Bajirao Patil (MLA for Osmanabad Constituency No. 242- Osmanabad District (Legislative Assembly)	26 June 1988	03 March 1990	1 year, 250 days	Indian National Congress	Pawar II	Sharad Pawar
22		Shivajirao Deshmukh (MLC for Elected by MLAs Constituency No. 18 - Sangli District) (Legislative Council)	03 March 1990	25 January 1991	328 days	Indian National Congress	Pawar III	Sharad Pawar
23		Abhaysinh Raje Bhosale (MLA for Satara Constituency No. 262- Satara District (Legislative Assembly)	25 January 1991	25 June 1991	151 days	Indian National Congress	Pawar III	Sharad Pawar
24		Sudhakarrao Naik (MLA for Pusad Constituency No. 81- Yavatmal District) (Legislative Assembly) (Chief Minister)	25 June 1991	26 December 1991	184 days	Indian National Congress	Sudhakarrao	Sudhakarrao Naik
25		Vijaysinh Mohite-Patil (MLA for Malshiras Constituency No. 254- Solapur District) (Legislative Assembly)	26 December 1991	22 February 1993	1 year, 58 days	Indian National Congress	Sudhakarrao	Sudhakarrao Naik
26		Vilasrao Deshmukh (MLA for Latur City Constituency No. 235- Latur District) (Legislative Assembly)	06 March 1993	18 November 1994	1 year, 257 days	Indian National Congress	Pawar IV	Sharad Pawar
27		Radhakrishna Vikhe Patil (MLA for Shirdi Constituency No. 218- Ahmednagar District) (Legislative Assembly)	14 March 1995	01 February 1999	3 years, 324 days	Shiv Sena	Joshi	Manohar Joshi
28		Chandrakant Khaire (MLA for Aurangabad West Constituency No. 108- Chhatrapati Sambhaji Nagar District Also Previously Known Aurangabad District (Legislative Assembly)	01 February 1999	11 May 1999	99 days	Shiv Sena	Rane	Narayan Rane
29		Gajanan Kirtikar (MLA for Malad Constituency No. 177- Mumbai Suburban District (Legislative Assembly)	11 May 1999	17 October 1999	159 days	Shiv Sena	Rane	Narayan Rane
30		Vilasrao Deshmukh (MLA for Latur City Constituency No. 235- Latur District) (Legislative Assembly) (Chief Minister)	19 October 1999	27 October 1999	8 days	Indian National Congress	Deshmukh I	Vilasrao Deshmukh
31		Vilasrao Balkrishna Patil (MLA for Karad South Constituency No. 260- Satara District) (Legislative Assembly)	27 October 1999	16 January 2003	3 years, 81 days	Indian National Congress	Deshmukh I	Vilasrao Deshmukh
32		Vilasrao Balkrishna Patil (MLA for Karad South Constituency No. 260- Satara District) (Legislative Assembly)	18 January 2003	01 November 2004	1 year, 295 days	Indian National Congress	Sushilkumar	Sushilkumar Shinde
33		Vilasrao Deshmukh (MLA for Latur City Constituency No. 235- Latur District) (Legislative Assembly) (Chief Minister)	01 November 2004	09 November 2004	8 days	Indian National Congress	Deshmukh II	Vilasrao Deshmukh
34		Patangrao Kadam (MLA for Palus-Kadegaon Constituency No. 285- Sangli District) (Legislative Assembly)	09 November 2004	01 December 2008	4 years, 22 days	Indian National Congress	Deshmukh II	Vilasrao Deshmukh
35		Babanrao Pachpute (MLA for Shrigonda Constituency No. 226- Ahmednagar District (Legislative Assembly)	08 December 2008	06 November 2009	333 days	Nationalist Congress Party	Ashok I	Ashok Chavan
36		Narayan Rane (MLC for Elected by MLAs Constituency No. 03 - Sindhudurg District) (Legislative Council)	07 November 2009	10 November 2010	1 year, 3 days	Indian National Congress	Ashok II	Ashok Chavan
37		Sunil Tatkare (MLA for Shrivardhan Constituency No. 193- Raigad District) (Legislative Assembly)	11 November 2010	26 September 2014	3 years, 319 days	Nationalist Congress Party	Prithviraj	Prithviraj Chavan
38		Eknath Khadse (MLA for Muktainagar Constituency No. 20- Jalgaon District) (Legislative Assembly)	31 October 2014	04 June 2016	1 year, 217 days	Bharatiya Janata Party	Fadnavis I	Devendra Fadnavis
39		Devendra Fadnavis (MLA for Nagpur South West Constituency No. 52- Nagpur District) (Legislative Assembly) (Chief_Minister); Additional Charge	04 June 2016	08 July 2016	34 days	Bharatiya Janata Party	Fadnavis I	Devendra Fadnavis
40		Pankaja Munde (MLA for Parli Constituency No. 233- Beed District) (Legislative Assembly)	08 July 2016	12 November 2019	3 years, 127 days	Bharatiya Janata Party	Fadnavis I	Devendra Fadnavis
41		Devendra Fadnavis (MLA for Nagpur South West Constituency No. 52- Nagpur District) (Legislative Assembly) (Chief_Minister); In Charge	23 November 2019	28 November 2019	5 days	Bharatiya Janata Party	Fadnavis II	Devendra Fadnavis
42		Subhash Desai (MLC for Elected by MLAs Constituency No. 09 - Mumbai Suburban District) (Legislative Council)	28 November 2019	30 December 2019	32 days	Shiv Sena	Thackeray	Uddhav Thackeray
43		Vijay Namdevrao Wadettiwar (MLA for Bramhapuri Constituency No. 73- Chandrapur District) (Legislative Assembly)	30 December 2019	29 June 2022	2 years, 181 days	Indian National Congress	Thackeray	Uddhav Thackeray
44		Eknath Shinde (MLA for Kopri-Pachpakhadi Constituency No. 147- Thane District) (Legislative Assembly) (Chief Minister); In Charge	30 June 2022	14 August 2022	45 days	Shiv Sena (Shinde Group)	Eknath	Eknath Shinde
45		Eknath Shinde (MLA for Kopri-Pachpakhadi Constituency No. 147- Thane District) (Legislative Assembly) (Chief Minister)	14 August 2022	26 November 2024	2 years, 135 days	Shiv Sena (Shinde Group)	Eknath	Eknath Shinde
46		Devendra Fadnavis (MLA for Nagpur South West Constituency No. 52- Nagpur District) (Legislative Assembly) (Chief_Minister); In Charge	05 December 2024	Incumbent	1 year, 277 days	Bharatiya Janata Party	Fadnavis III	Devendra Fadnavis

== Ministers of State ==
No.	Portrait	Deputy Minister (Constituency)	Term of office			Political party	Ministry	Minister	Chief Minister
No.	Portrait	Deputy Minister (Constituency)	From	To	Period	Political party	Ministry	Minister	Chief Minister
Deputy Minister of Earthquake Rehabilitation
The Post of Deputy Minister / Minister of States has been kept Vacant from 23 November 2019 To 28 November 2019			23 November 2019	28 November 2019	5 days	NA	Fadnavis II	Devendra Fadnavis	Devendra Fadnavis
01		Sanjay Bansode (MLA for Udgir Constituency No. 237- Latur District) (Legislative Assembly)	30 December 2019	29 June 2022	2 years, 181 days	Nationalist Congress Party	Thackeray	Vijay Namdevrao Wadettiwar	Uddhav Thackeray
The Post of Deputy Minister / Minister of States has been kept Vacant from 30 June 2022			30 June 2022	26 November 2024	2 years, 149 days	NA	Eknath	Eknath Shinde	Eknath Shinde
Vacant			21 December 2024	incumbent	1 year, 261 days	NA	Fadnavis III	Devendra Fadnavis (2024 – Present)	Devendra Fadnavis
