= Ministry of Command Area Development (Maharashtra) =

Maharashtra government ministry responsible for Command Area Development

Ministry of Command Area Development Government of Maharashtra
- मंत्रालय लाभक्षेत्र विकास / आदेश क्षेत्र विकास विभाग, महाराष्ट्र शासन
- Seal of the state of Maharashtra

- Building of Administrative Headquarters of Mumbai

Ministry overview
- Jurisdiction: (India) Maharashtra
- Headquarters: Mantralay, Mumbai
- Minister responsible: Devendra Fadnavis, Chief Minister
- Deputy Minister responsible: Vacant, TBD since 29 June 2022, Minister of State
- Ministry executive: (IAS)
- Parent department: Government of Maharashtra

The Ministry of Command Area Development is a ministry of the Government of Maharashtra. It is responsible for preparing annual plans for the development of Maharashtra state.

The Ministry is headed by a cabinet level Minister. Devendra Fadnavis is Current Chief Minister of Maharashtra and Minister of Command Area Development Government of Maharashtrasince 05 December 2024.

== Head office ==
Minister of Command Area Development मंत्री लाभक्षेत्र विकास / आदेश क्षेत्र विकास विभाग
- Emblem of India

- Flag of India

- Incumbent; Devendra Fadnavis; Chief Minister since 05 December 2024
- Ministry of Command Area Development (Maharashtra)
- Style: The Honourable
- Abbreviation: Cabinet Minister
- Member of: State Cabinet
- Reports to: Chief Minister, Maharashtra Legislature
- Seat: Mantralaya, Mumbai
- Appointer: Governor on the advice of the Chief Minister
- Term length: 5 years
- Precursor: Jayant Patil; (2019- 2022)
- Inaugural holder: P. K. Sawant; (1960-1962)
- Formation: 1 May 1960
- Deputy: Vacant, TBD; since 29 June 2022

== Cabinet Ministers ==
| No. | Portrait | Minister (Constituency) | Term of office | | | Political party | Ministry | Chief Minister |
| No. | Portrait | Minister (Constituency) | From | To | Period | Political party | Ministry | Chief Minister |
Minister of Command Area Development
| 01 | | Sheshrao Krishnarao Wankhede (MLA for Sawargoan Constituency No. 49- Nagpur District) (Legislative Assembly) | 01 May 1960 | 07 March 1962 | 1 year, 310 days | Indian National Congress | Yashwantrao I | Yashwantrao Chavan |
| 02 | | Parashuram Krishnaji Sawant (MLA for Chiplun Constituency No. 265- Ratnagiri District) (Legislative Assembly) | 08 March 1962 | 19 November 1962 | 256 days | Indian National Congress | Yashwantrao II | Yashwantrao Chavan |
| 03 | | Shankarrao Chavan (MLA for Bhokar Constituency No. 85- Nanded District) (Legislative Assembly) | 20 November 1962 | 24 November 1963 | 1 year, 4 days | Indian National Congress | Kannamwar l | Marotrao Kannamwar |
| 04 | | Parashuram Krishnaji Sawant (MLA for Chiplun Constituency No. 265- Ratnagiri District) (Legislative Assembly) (Interim Chief Minister) | 25 November 1962 | 04 December 1963 | 9 days | Indian National Congress | Sawant | Parashuram Krishnaji Sawant |
| 05 | | Balasaheb Desai (MLA for Patan Constituency No. 261- Satara District) (Legislative Assembly) | 05 December 1963 | 01 March 1967 | 3 years, 86 days | Indian National Congress | Vasantrao I | Vasantrao Naik |
| 06 | | Shankarrao Chavan (MLA for Bhokar Constituency No. 85- Nanded District) (Legislative Assembly) | 01 March 1967 | 27 October 1969 | 2 years, 240 days | Indian National Congress | Vasantrao II | Vasantrao Naik |
| 07 | | Narendra Mahipati Tidke (MLA for Savner Constituency No. 49- Nagpur District) (Legislative Assembly) | 27 October 1969 | 13 March 1972 | 2 years, 138 days | Indian National Congress | Vasantrao II | Vasantrao Naik |
| 08 | | Vasantrao Naik (MLA for Pusad Constituency No. 81- Yavatmal District) (Legislative Assembly) (Chief Minister) | 13 March 1972 | 04 April 1973 | 1 year, 32 days | Indian National Congress | Vasantrao III | Vasantrao Naik |
| 09 | | Abdul Rahman Antulay (MLA for Shrivardhan Constituency No. 193- Raigad District) (Legislative Assembly) | 04 April 1973 | 17 Match; 1974 | 347 days | Indian National Congress | Vasantrao III | Vasantrao Naik |
| 10 | | Vasantrao Naik (MLA for Pusad Constituency No. 81- Yavatmal District) (Legislative Assembly) (Chief Minister) | 17 Match; 1974 | 21 February 1975 | 341 days | Indian National Congress | Vasantrao III | Vasantrao Naik |
| 11 | | Shankarrao Chavan (MLA for Bhokar Constituency No. 85- Nanded District) (Legislative Assembly) (Chief Minister) | 21 February 1975 | 16 April 1977 | 2 years, 54 days | Indian National Congress | Shankarrao I | Shankarrao Chavan |
| 12 | | Hari Govindrao Vartak (MLA for Bassein-Vasai Constituency No. 180- Palghar District (Legislative Assembly) | 17 April 1977 | 07 March 1978 | 1 year, 324 days | Indian National Congress | Vasantdada I | Vasantdada Patil |
| 13 | | Purushottam Dekate (MLA for Umred Constituency No. 51- Nagpur District (Legislative Assembly) | 07 March 1978 | 18 July 1978 | 133 days | Indian National Congress (Indira) | Vasantdada II | Vasantdada Patil |
| 14 | | Shankarrao Chavan (MLA for Bhokar Constituency No. 85- Nanded District) (Legislative Assembly) | 18 July 1978 | 18 February 1980 | 1 year, 215 days | Indian Congress (Socialist) | Pawar I | Sharad Pawar |
| 15 | | Abdul Rahman Antulay (MLA for Shrivardhan Constituency No. 193- Raigad District) (Legislative Assembly) (Chief Minister) | 09 June 1980 | 21 January 1982 | 1 year, 226 days | Indian National Congress | Antulay | Abdul Rahman Antulay |
| 16 | | Babasaheb Bhosale (MLA for Nehrunagar Constituency No. 172- Mumbai Suburban District) (Legislative Assembly) (Chief Minister) | 21 January 1982 | 02 February 1983 | 1 year, 12 days | Indian National Congress | Bhosale | Babasaheb Bhosale |
| 17 | | Shivajirao Patil Nilangekar (MLA for Nilanga Constituency No. 238- Latur District) (Legislative Assembly) | 07 February 1983 | 05 March 1985 | 2 years, 26 days | Indian National Congress | Vasantdada III | Vasantdada Patil |
| 18 | | Vasantdada Patil (MLA for Sangli Constituency No. 282- Sangli District) (Legislative Assembly) (Chief Minister) | 12 March 1985 | 03 June 1985 | 83 days | Indian National Congress | Vasantdada IV | Vasantdada Patil |
| 19 | | Vijaysinh Mohite-Patil (MLA for Malshiras Constituency No. 254- Solapur District) (Legislative Assembly) | 03 June 1985 | 12 March 1986 | 282 days | Indian National Congress | Nilangekar | Shivajirao Patil Nilangekar |
| 20 | | Bhagwantrao Gaikwad (MLA for Dindori Constituency No. 122- Nashik District (Legislative Assembly) | 12 March 1986 | 26 June 1988 | 2 years, 106 days | Indian National Congress | Shankarrao II | Shankarrao Chavan |
| 21 | | Vilasrao Deshmukh (MLA for Latur City Constituency No. 235- Latur District) (Legislative Assembly) | 26 June 1988 | 03 March 1990 | 1 year, 250 days | Indian National Congress | Pawar II | Sharad Pawar |
| 22 | | Padamsinh Bajirao Patil (MLA for Osmanabad Constituency No. 242- Osmanabad District (Legislative Assembly) | 03 March 1990 | 25 June 1991 | 1 year, 114 days | Indian National Congress | Pawar III | Sharad Pawar |
| 23 | | Padamsinh Bajirao Patil (MLA for Osmanabad Constituency No. 242- Osmanabad District (Legislative Assembly) | 25 June 1991 | 22 February 1993 | 1 year, 242 days | Indian National Congress | Sudhakarrao | Sudhakarrao Naik |
| 24 | | Sharad Pawar (MLA for Baramati Constituency No. 201- Pune District) (Legislative Assembly) (Chief Minister) | 06 March 1993 | 18 November 1994 | 1 year, 257 days | Indian National Congress | Pawar IV | Sharad Pawar |
| 25 | | Mahadeorao Sukaji Shivankar (MLA for Amgaon Constituency No. 66- Gondia district) (Legislative Assembly) | 14 March 1995 | 10 June 1997 | 2 years, 88 days | Bharatiya Janata Party | Joshi | Manohar Joshi |
| 26 | | Eknath Khadse (MLA for Muktainagar Constituency No. 20- Jalgaon District) (Legislative Assembly) | 10 June 1997 | 01 February 1999 | 1 year, 236 days | Bharatiya Janata Party | Joshi | Manohar Joshi |
| 27 | | Gopinath Munde (MLA for Renapur Constituency No. 236- Latur District) (Legislative Assembly) (Deputy Chief Minister) | 01 February 1999 | 11 May 1999 | 99 days | Bharatiya Janata Party | Rane | Narayan Rane |
| 28 | | Narayan Rane (MLA for Malvan Constituency No. 269- Sindhudurg District) (Legislative Assembly) (Chief Minister) | 11 May 1999 | 17 October 1999 | 159 days | Shiv Sena | Rane | Narayan Rane |
| 29 | | Padamsinh Bajirao Patil (MLA for Osmanabad Constituency No. 242- Osmanabad District (Legislative Assembly) | 19 October 1999 | 16 January 2003 | 3 years, 89 days | Nationalist Congress Party | Deshmukh I | Vilasrao Deshmukh |
| 30 | | Sushilkumar Shinde (MLA for Solapur South Constituency No. 251- Solapur District) (Legislative Assembly) (Chief Minister) | 18 January 2003 | 01 November 2004 | 1 year, 295 days | Indian National Congress | Sushilkumar | Sushilkumar Shinde |
| 31 | | R. R. Patil (MLA for Tasgaon-Kavathe Mahankal Constituency No. 287- Sangli District) (Legislative Assembly) (Deputy Chief Minister) | 01 November 2004 | 09 November 2004 | 8 days | Nationalist Congress Party | Deshmukh II | Vilasrao Deshmukh |
| 32 | | Ajit Pawar (MLA for Baramati Constituency No. 201- Pune District) (Legislative Assembly) | 09 November 2004 | 01 December 2008 | 4 years, 22 days | Nationalist Congress Party | Deshmukh II | Vilasrao Deshmukh |
| 33 | | Ajit Pawar (MLA for Baramati Constituency No. 201- Pune District) (Legislative Assembly) | 08 December 2008 | 06 November 2009 | 333 days | Nationalist Congress Party | Ashok I | Ashok Chavan |
| 34 | | Ajit Pawar (MLA for Baramati Constituency No. 201- Pune District) (Legislative Assembly) | 07 November 2009 | 10 November 2010 | 1 year, 3 days | Nationalist Congress Party | Ashok II | Ashok Chavan |
| 35 | | Sunil Tatkare (MLA for Shrivardhan Constituency No. 193- Raigad District) (Legislative Assembly) | 11 November 2010 | 26 June 2014 | 3 years, 227 days | Nationalist Congress Party | Prithviraj | Prithviraj Chavan |
| 36 | | Bhaskar Jadhav (MLA for Guhagar Constituency No. 264- Ratnagiri District) (Legislative Assembly) | 26 June 2014 | 26 September 2014 | 92 days | Nationalist Congress Party | Prithviraj | Prithviraj Chavan |
| 37 | | Devendra Fadnavis (MLA for Nagpur South West Constituency No. 52- Nagpur District) (Legislative Assembly) (Chief Minister) | 31 October 2014 | 04 December 2014 | 34 days | Bharatiya Janata Party | Fadnavis I | Devendra Fadnavis |
| 38 | | Girish Mahajan (MLA for Jamner Constituency No. 19- Jalgaon District) (Legislative Assembly) | 05 December 2014 | 12 November 2019 | 4 years, 342 days | Bharatiya Janata Party | Fadnavis I | Devendra Fadnavis |
| 39 | | Devendra Fadnavis (MLA for Nagpur South West Constituency No. 52- Nagpur District) (Legislative Assembly) (Chief_Minister); In Charge | 23 November 2019 | 28 November 2019 | 5 days | Bharatiya Janata Party | Fadnavis II | Devendra Fadnavis |
| 40 | | Chhagan Bhujbal (MLA for Yevla Constituency No. 119- Nashik District) (Legislative Assembly) | 28 November 2019 | 30 December 2019 | 32 days | Nationalist Congress Party | Thackeray | Uddhav Thackeray |
| 41 | | Jayant Patil (MLA for Islampur Constituency No. 283- Sangli District) (Legislative Assembly) | 30 December 2019 | 29 June 2022 | 2 years, 181 days | Nationalist Congress Party | Thackeray | Uddhav Thackeray |
| 42 | | Eknath Shinde (MLA for Kopri-Pachpakhadi Constituency No. 147- Thane District) (Legislative Assembly) (Chief Minister); In Charge | 30 June 2022 | 14 August 2022 | 45 days | Shiv Sena (2022–present) | Eknath | Eknath Shinde |
| 43 | | Devendra Fadnavis (MLA for Nagpur South West Constituency No. 52- Nagpur District) (Legislative Assembly) (Deputy Chief Minister) | 14 August 2022 | 26 November 2024 | 2 years, 135 days | Bharatiya Janata Party | Eknath | Eknath Shinde |
| 44 | | Devendra Fadnavis (MLA for Nagpur South West Constituency No. 52- Nagpur District) (Legislative Assembly) (Chief_Minister); In Charge | 05 December 2024 | Incumbent | 1 year, 277 days | Bharatiya Janata Party | Fadnavis III | Devendra Fadnavis |

== Ministers of State ==
| No. | Portrait | Deputy Minister (Constituency) | Term of office | | | Political party | Ministry | Minister | Chief Minister |
| No. | Portrait | Deputy Minister (Constituency) | From | To | Period | Political party | Ministry | Minister | Chief Minister |
Deputy Minister of Command Area Development
| Vacant | | | 23 November 2019 | 28 November 2019 | 5 days | NA | Fadnavis II | Devendra Fadnavis | Devendra Fadnavis |
| 01 | | Omprakash Babarao Kadu (MLA for Achalpur Constituency No. 42- Amravati District) (Legislative Assembly) | 30 December 2019 | 27 June 2022 | 2 years, 179 days | Prahar Janshakti Party Supported Party (Shiv Sena) | Thackeray | Jayant Patil | Uddhav Thackeray |
| 02 | | Satej Patil (MLC for Elected by Kolhapur Local Authorities Constituency No. 06 - Kolhapur District) (Legislative Council); Additional_Charge | 27 June 2022 | 29 June 2022 | 2 days | Indian National Congress | Thackeray | Jayant Patil | Uddhav Thackeray |
| Vacant | | | 30 June 2022 | 26 November 2024 | 2 years, 149 days | NA | Eknath | Eknath Shinde (2022 - 2022); Devendra Fadnavis (2022 – 2024) | Eknath Shinde |
| Vacant | | | 21 December 2024 | incumbent | 1 year, 261 days | NA | Fadnavis III | Devendra Fadnavis (2024 – Present) | Devendra Fadnavis |
