= Government of Maharashtra =

Indian state government

Government of Maharashtra महाराष्ट्र शासन
- Emblem of Maharashtra

- Flag of India
- Formation: 1 May 1960; 66 years ago (Maharashtra Day)
- Country: Republic of India
- Website: www.maharashtra.gov.in
- Seat of Government: Mantralaya, Mumbai

Legislative Branch
- Legislature: Maharashtra Legislature
- Upper House: Maharashtra Legislative Council
- Chairperson of the House: Ram Shinde, BJP
- Deputy Chairperson of the House: Sachin Ahir, SHS
- Leader of the House: Eknath Shinde, SHS (Deputy Chief Minister)
- Deputy Leader of the House: Pankaja Munde, BJP (Cabinet Minister)
- Leader of the Opposition: Vacant
- Deputy Leader of the Opposition: Vacant
- Members in Council: 78
- Lower House: Maharashtra Legislative Assembly
- Speaker of the House: Rahul Narwekar, BJP
- Deputy Speaker of the House: Anna Bansode, NCP
- Leader of the House: Devendra Fadnavis, BJP (Chief Minister)
- Deputy Leader of the House: Eknath Shinde, SHS (Deputy Chief Minister); Sunetra Ajit Pawar, NCP (Deputy Chief Minister)
- Leader of the Opposition: Vacant
- Deputy Leader of the Opposition: Vacant
- Members in Assembly: 288
- Meeting Place: Vidhan Bhavan, Mumbai (Budget Session, Monsoon Session, and Special Sessions); Vidhan Bhavan, Nagpur (Winter Session)

Executive Branch
- Governor (Head of the State): Jishnu Dev Varma
- Chief Minister (Head of the Government): Devendra Fadnavis, BJP
- Deputy Chief Minister (Deputy Head of Government): Eknath Shinde, SHS; Sunetra Ajit Pawar, NCP
- Chief Secretary (Head of Civil Service): Rajesh Aggarwal, IAS
- Director General (Head of Police Service): Sadanand Date, IPS
- State Cabinet: Fadnavis III
- Meeting Place: Mantralaya, Mumbai
- Ministries (Government Departments): 68
- Total No. of Members of the Cabinet: (Chief Minister 01); (Dy Chief Minister 02); (Cabinet Ministers 33); (Ministers of State 06); Total = 43
- Responsible for This: Maharashtra Legislative Assembly

Judiciary Branch
- High Court: Bombay High Court
- Chief Justice: Ravindra Vithalrao Ghuge (Acting CJ)

The Government of Maharashtra is the executive branch of the Indian state of Maharashtra. The government is led by the chief minister (currently Devendra Fadnavis since 5 December 2024) who selects the council of ministers and is appointed by the Governor of Maharashtra. The state has had a BJP-led government since 2024. The chief minister and his council of ministers form the cabinet of Maharashtra, which is responsible for overseeing the administration of the state, policy formulation, etc.

Ministers are responsible to the House in which they sit; they make statements in that House and take questions from members of that House. For most senior ministers, this is usually the directly elected Legislative Assembly rather than the indirectly elected Legislative Council. The government is dependent on the Legislature to make primary legislation, and general elections are held every five years (at most) to elect a new Legislative Assembly. After an election, the Governor selects as chief minister the leader of the party or alliance commanding the confidence of the Legislative Assembly, usually by possessing a majority of MLAs.

== Head Leaders ==
House	Leader	Portrait	Since
Constitutional Posts
Governor	Jishnu Dev Varma		06 March 2026
Chief Minister	Devendra Fadnavis		05 December 2024
First Deputy Chief Minister	Eknath Shinde		05 December 2024
Second Deputy Chief Minister	Sunetra Ajit Pawar		31 January 2026
Chairperson Maharashtra Legislative Council	Ram Shinde	The Minister of State for Home (Rural), Public Health, Tourism and Marketing of Maharashtra, Prof. Ram Shinde meeting the Union Minister for Human Resource Development, Smt. Smriti Irani, in New Delhi on February 23, 2015 (cropped)	07 July 2022
Speaker Maharashtra Legislative Assembly	Rahul Narwekar		09 December 2024
Deputy Chairperson Maharashtra Legislative Council	Sachin Ahir		01 July 2026
Deputy Speaker Maharashtra Legislative Assembly	Anna Bansode		25 March 2025
Leader of the House Maharashtra Legislative Assembly	Devendra Fadnavis		05 December 2024
Leader of the House Maharashtra Legislative Council	Eknath Shinde		09 December 2024
First Deputy Leader of the House Maharashtra Legislative Assembly	Eknath Shinde		05 December 2024
Second Deputy Leader of the House Maharashtra Legislative Assembly	Sunetra Ajit Pawar		31 January 2026
Deputy Leader of the House of Maharashtra Legislative Council	Pankaja Munde		21 December 2024
Leader of the Opposition Maharashtra Legislative Assembly	Vacant		26 November 2024
Leader of Opposition Maharashtra Legislative Council	Vacant		29 August 2025
First Deputy Leader of Opposition (Maharashtra Legislative Assembly)	Vacant		26 November 2024
Second Deputy Leader of Opposition (Maharashtra Legislative Assembly)	Vacant		26 November 2024
Deputy Leader of Opposition (Maharashtra Legislative Council)	Vacant		29 August 2025
Chief Secretary of Maharashtra	Rajesh Aggarwal		01 December 2025

== Council of Ministers ==
The cabinet expansion took place at Raj Bhavan in Nagpur on 15 December 2024. Maharashtra can have a maximum of 43 ministers. 33 were inducted as Cabinet ministers, 6 were sworn in as ministers of state. 19 ministers from the BJP, 11 from the Shiv Sena and 9 from the NCP taken oath as cabinet ministers.

Cabinet ministers portfolios where allocated on 21 December 2024.
Council portfolios are as follows

Update = 31 January 2026

=== Cabinet Ministers ===
Portfolio	Minister	Took office	Left office	Party
Chief Minister: Minister of General Administration; Minister of Home Affairs; Minister of Law & Judiciary; Minister of Information & Public Relations; Minister of Energy (excluding Non-Conventional Energy); Other departments not allocated to any Minister.: Minister of Command Area Development; Earthquake Rehabilitation; Minister of Socially and Educationally Backward Classes; Minister of Vimukta Jati; Minister of Nomadic Tribes; Minister of Special Backward Classes Welfare; Minister of Majority Welfare Development	Devendra Fadnavis	05 December 2024	Incumbent	BJP
Deputy Chief Minister: Minister of Urban Development; Minister of Housing; Minister of Public Works (Including Public Undertakings)	Eknath Shinde	05 December 2024	Incumbent	SHS
Deputy Chief Minister	Ajit Pawar	05 December 2024	28 January 2026	NCP
Deputy Chief Minister	Sunetra Pawar	31 January 2026	Incumbent	NCP
Cabinet Minister: Minister of Finance; Minister of Planning	Ajit Anantrao Pawar (Dy Chief Minister)	05 December 2024	28 January 2026	NCP
Cabinet Minister: Minister of Finance; Minister of Planning	Devendra Fadnavis (Chief Minister) Additional Charge	28 January 2026	31 January 2026	BJP
Cabinet Minister: Minister of Finance; Minister of Planning	Devendra Fadnavis (Chief Minister)	31 January 2026	Incumbent	BJP
Cabinet Minister: Minister for State Excise	Ajit Anantrao Pawar (Dy Chief Minister)	05 December 2024	28 January 2026	NCP
Cabinet Minister: Minister for State Excise	Devendra Fadnavis (Chief Minister) Additional Charge	28 January 2026	31 January 2026	BJP
Cabinet Minister: Minister for State Excise	Sunetra Pawar (Dy Chief Minister)	31 January 2026	Incumbent	NCP
Cabinet Minister: Minister of Sports & Youth Welfare; Minister of Minority Development & Aukaf	Dattatray Bharne	15 December 2024	31 July 2025	NCP
Cabinet Minister: Minister of Sports & Youth Welfare; Minister of Minority Development & Aukaf	Manikrao Kokate	31 July 2025	17 December 2025	NCP
Cabinet Minister: Minister of Sports & Youth Welfare; Minister of Minority Development & Aukaf	Ajit Pawar (Dy Chief Minister)	17 December 2025	28 January 2026	NCP
Cabinet Minister: Minister of Sports & Youth Welfare; Minister of Minority Development & Aukaf	Devendra Fadnavis (Chief Minister) Additional Charge	28 January 2026	31 January 2026	BJP
Cabinet Minister: Minister of Sports & Youth Welfare; Minister of Minority Development & Aukaf	Sunetra Pawar (Dy Chief Minister)	31 January 2026	Incumbent	NCP
Cabinet Minister: Minister of Water Resources (Godavari & Krishna Valley)	Radhakrishna Vikhe Patil	15 December 2024	Incumbent	BJP
Cabinet Minister: Minister of Revenue	Chandrashekhar Bawankule	15 December 2024	Incumbent	BJP
Cabinet Minister: Minister of Medical Education	Hasan Mushrif	15 December 2024	Incumbent	NCP
Cabinet Minister: Minister of Higher & Technical Education; Minister of Parliamentary Affairs	Chandrakant Patil	15 December 2024	Incumbent	BJP
Cabinet Minister: Minister of Water Resources (Vidharbha, Tapi, Konkan); Minister of Disaster Management	Girish Mahajan	15 December 2024	Incumbent	BJP
Cabinet Minister: Minister of Water Supply; Sanitation	Gulab Raghunath Patil	15 December 2024	Incumbent	SHS
Cabinet Minister: Minister of Forest	Ganesh Naik	15 December 2024	Incumbent	BJP
Cabinet Minister: Minister of School Education	Dadaji Bhuse	15 December 2024	Incumbent	SHS
Cabinet Minister: Minister of Soil & Water Conservation	Sanjay Rathod	15 December 2024	Incumbent	SHS
Cabinet Minister: Minister of Food and Civil Supplies; Minister of Consumer Affairs	Dhananjay Munde	15 December 2024	4 March 2025	NCP
Cabinet Minister: Minister of Food and Civil Supplies; Minister of Consumer Affairs	Ajit Pawar	4 March 2025	20 May 2025	NCP
Cabinet Minister: Minister of Food and Civil Supplies; Minister of Consumer Affairs	Chhagan Bhujbal	20 May 2025	Incumbent	NCP
Cabinet Minister: Minister of Skill Development & Entrepreneurship	Mangal Prabhat Lodha	15 December 2024	Incumbent	BJP
Cabinet Minister: Minister of Industries; Minister of Marathi Language	Uday Samant	15 December 2024	Incumbent	SHS
Cabinet Minister: Minister of Marketing; Minister of Protocol	Jayakumar Rawal	15 December 2024	Incumbent	BJP
Cabinet Minister: Minister of Environment & Climate Change; Minister of Animal Husbandry	Pankaja Munde	15 December 2024	Incumbent	BJP
Cabinet Minister: Minister for Other Backward Classes; Minister for Other Backward Bahujan Welfare; Minister of Dairy Development; Minister of New and Renewable Energy	Atul Save	15 December 2024	Incumbent	BJP
Cabinet Minister: Minister of Tribal Development	Ashok Uike	15 December 2024	Incumbent	BJP
Cabinet Minister: Minister of Tourism; Minister of Mining; Minister of Ex. Servicemen Welfare	Shambhuraj Desai	15 December 2024	Incumbent	SHS
Cabinet Minister: Minister of Information Technology; Minister of Cultural Affairs	Ashish Shelar	15 December 2024	Incumbent	BJP
Cabinet Minister: Minister of Woman & Child Development	Aditi Tatkare	15 December 2024	Incumbent	NCP
Cabinet Minister: Minister of Public Works (Excluding Public Undertakings)	Shivendra Raje Bhosale	15 December 2024	Incumbent	BJP
Cabinet Minister: Minister of Agriculture	Manikrao Kokate	15 December 2024	31 July 2025	NCP
Cabinet Minister: Minister of Agriculture	Dattatray Bharne	31 July 2025	Incumbent	NCP
Cabinet Minister: Minister of Rural Development; Minister of Panchayat Raj	Jaykumar Gore	15 December 2024	Incumbent	BJP
Cabinet Minister: Minister of Food & Drug Administration; Minister of Special Assistance	Narhari Zirwal	15 December 2024	Incumbent	NCP
Cabinet Minister: Minister of Textiles	Sanjay Savkare	15 December 2024	Incumbent	BJP
Cabinet Minister: Minister of Social Justice	Sanjay Shirsat	15 December 2024	Incumbent	SHS
Cabinet Minister: Minister of Transport	Pratap Sarnaik	15 December 2024	Incumbent	SHS
Cabinet Minister: Minister of Horticulture; Minister of Employment Guarantee; Minister of Khar Land Development	Bharatshet Gogawale	15 December 2024	Incumbent	SHS
Cabinet Minister: Minister of Relief & Rehabilitation	Makrand Jadhav - Patil	15 December 2024	Incumbent	NCP
Cabinet Minister: Minister of Fisheries; Minister of Ports Development	Nitesh Rane	15 December 2024	Incumbent	BJP
Cabinet Minister: Minister of Labour	Akash Fundkar	15 December 2024	Incumbent	BJP
Cabinet Minister: Minister of Co-operation	Babasaheb Patil	15 December 2024	Incumbent	NCP
Cabinet Minister: Minister of Public Health and Family Welfare	Prakashrao Abitkar	15 December 2024	Incumbent	SHS
Cabinet Minister: Minister of Disability Welfare	Devendra Fadnavis; Chief Minister Additional Charge	15 December 2024	15 December 2024	BJP
Cabinet Minister: Minister of Disability Welfare	Atul Save	15 December 2024	Incumbent	BJP
Cabinet Minister Minister for State Border Defence	Devendra Fadnavis; Chief Minister Additional Charge	15 December 2024	13 February 2025	BJP
Cabinet Minister Minister for State Border Defence	Chandrakant Patil (First)	13 February 2025	Incumbent	BJP
Cabinet Minister Minister for State Border Defence	Shambhuraj Desai (Second)	13 February 2025	Incumbent	BJP

=== Ministers of State ===
Portfolio	Minister	Took office	Left office	Party
Minister of State: Urban Development; Transport; Social Justice; Medical Education; Minority Development and Aukaf	Madhuri Misal	15 December 2024	Incumbent	BJP
Minister of State: Finance; Planning; Agriculture; Relief and Rehabilitation; Law and Judiciary; Labour	Ashish Jaiswal	15 December 2024	Incumbent	SHS
Minister of State: Home Affairs (Rural); Housing; School Education; Co-operation; Mining	Pankaj Bhoyar	15 December 2024	Incumbent	BJP
Minister of State: Water Supply; Sanitation; Public Health and Family Welfare; Energy; New and Renewable Energy; Woman and Child Development; Public Works (Including Public Undertakings)	Meghana Bordikar	15 December 2024	Incumbent	BJP
Minister of State: Industries; Public Works (excluding Public Undertakings); Higher Education and Technical Education; Tribal Development; Tourism; Soil and Water Conservation	Indranil Naik	15 December 2024	Incumbent	NCP
Minister of State: Home Affairs (Urban); Revenue; Rural Development; Panchayat Raj; Food and Civil Supplies; Consumer Affairs; Food and Drug Administration	Yogesh Kadam	15 December 2024	Incumbent	SHS
Minister of State: General Administration; Information Technology; Information and Public Relations; Environment and climate change; Ex. Servicemen Welfare; Majority Welfare Development; Earthquake Rehabilitation; Khar land Development; Disability Welfare; Socially and Educationally Backward Classes; Vimukta Jati; Nomadic Tribes; Special Backward Classes Welfare; Water Resources; Command Area Development; Protocol; Animal Husbandry; Dairy Development; Forests Department; Cultural Affairs; Fisheries Department; Textiles; Parliamentary Affairs; Employment Guarantee; Horticulture; Marketing; Marathi Language; Other Backward Classes; Other Backward Bahujan Welfare; State Excise; State Border Defence; Skill Development And Entrepreneurship; Special Assistance; Sports and Youth Welfare; Ports Development; Disaster Management	Departments have not been assigned to the Any Minister of State	15 December 2024	Incumbent	Independence politician

== Guardian Ministers ==
District	Minister	Took office	Left office	Party	
Ahilya Nagar	Radhakrishna Vikhe Patil	18 January 2025	Incumbent	BJP	
Akola	Akash Fundkar	18 January 2025	Incumbent	BJP	
Amravati	Chandrashekhar Bawankule	18 January 2025	Incumbent	BJP	
Beed	Ajit Pawar (Dy Chief Minister)	18 January 2025	28 January 2026	NCP	
Beed	Devendra Fadnavis (Chief Minister) Additional Charge	28 January 2026	03 February 2026	BJP	
Beed	Sunetra Ajit Pawar (Dy Chief Minister)	03 February 2026	Incumbent	NCP	
Bhandara	Sanjay Savkare	18 January 2025	Incumbent	BJP	
Buldhana	Makrand Jadhav	18 January 2025	Incumbent	NCP	
Chandrapur	Ashok Uike	18 January 2025	Incumbent	BJP	
Chhatrapati Sambhaji Nagar	Sanjay Shirsat	18 January 2025	Incumbent	SHS	
Dharashiv	Pratap Sarnaik	18 January 2025	Incumbent	SHS	
Dhule	Jayakumar Rawal	18 January 2025	Incumbent	BJP	
Gadchiroli	Devendra Fadnavis (Chief Minister)	18 January 2025	Incumbent	BJP	
Gadchiroli	Ashish Jaiswal (co-in-charge)	18 January 2025	Incumbent	SHS	
Gondia	Indranil Naik	18 January 2025	Incumbent	NCP	
Hingoli	Narhari Zirwal	18 January 2025	Incumbent	NCP	
Jalgaon	Gulabrao Patil	18 January 2025	Incumbent	SHS	
Jalna	Pankaja Munde	18 January 2025	Incumbent	BJP	
Kolhapur	Prakashrao Abitkar	18 January 2025	Incumbent	SHS	
Kolhapur	Madhuri Misal (co-in-charge)	18 January 2025	Incumbent	BJP	
Latur	Shivendra Raje Bhosale	18 January 2025	Incumbent	BJP	
Mumbai City	Eknath Shinde (Dy Chief Minister)	18 January 2025	Incumbent	SHS	
Mumbai Suburban	Ashish Shelar	18 January 2025	Incumbent	BJP	
Mumbai Suburban	Mangal Prabhat Lodha (co-in-charge)	18 January 2025	Incumbent	BJP	
Nagpur	Chandrashekhar Bawankule	18 January 2025	Incumbent	BJP	
Nanded	Atul Save	18 January 2025	Incumbent	BJP	
Nandurbar	Manikrao Kokate	18 January 2025	18 December 2025	NCP	
Nandurbar	Ajit Pawar (Dy Chief Minister) (Additional Charge)	18 January 2025	28 January 2026	NCP	
Nandurbar	Devendra Fadnavis (Chief Minister) Additional Charge	28 January 2026	Incumbent	BJP	
Nashik	Girish Mahajan	17 August 2026	Incumbent	BJP	
Nashik				BJP	
Palghar	Ganesh Naik	18 January 2025	Incumbent	BJP	
Parbhani	Meghana Bordikar	18 January 2025	Incumbent	BJP	
Pune	Ajit Pawar (Dy Chief Minister)	18 January 2025	28 January 2026	NCP	
Pune	Devendra Fadnavis (Chief Minister) Additional Charge	28 January 2026	03 February 2026	BJP	
Pune	Sunetra Ajit Pawar (Dy Chief Minister)	03 February 2026	Incumbent	NCP	
Raigad				NCP	
Raigad	Bharatshet Gogawale	17 August 2026	Incumbent		SHS
Raigad				BJP	
Ratnagiri	Uday Samant	18 January 2025	Incumbent	SHS	
Sangli	Chandrakant Patil	18 January 2025	Incumbent	BJP	
Satara	Shambhuraj Desai	18 January 2025	Incumbent	SHS	
Sindhudurg	Nitesh Rane	18 January 2025	Incumbent	BJP	
Solapur	Jaykumar Gore	18 January 2025	Incumbent	BJP	
Thane	Eknath Shinde (Dy Chief Minister)	18 January 2025	Incumbent	SHS	
Wardha	Pankaj Bhoyar	18 January 2025	Incumbent	BJP	
Washim	Hasan Mushrif	18 January 2025	Incumbent	NCP	
Yavatmal	Sanjay Rathod	18 January 2025	Incumbent	SHS	

== Departments ==
An alphabetical list of all the departments of Maharashtra Government with terms : Cabinet Ministers Update = 5 December 2024

Portfolio	Minister	Took office	Left office	Party
Ministry of General Administration	Devendra Fadnavis; Chief Minister Additional Charge	05 December 2024	Incumbent	BJP
Ministry of Law and Judiciary	Devendra Fadnavis; Chief Minister Additional Charge	05 December 2024	Incumbent	BJP
Ministry of Information and Public Relations	Devendra Fadnavis; Chief Minister Additional Charge	05 December 2024	Incumbent	BJP
Ministry of Information Technology	Devendra Fadnavis; Chief Minister Additional Charge	05 December 2024	Incumbent	BJP
Ministry of Forests Department	Devendra Fadnavis; Chief Minister Additional Charge	05 December 2024	Incumbent	BJP
Ministry of Home Affairs	to be decided Chief Minister Additional Charge	05 December 2024	Incumbent	BJP
Ministry of State Border Defence	to be decided Chief Minister Additional Charge	05 December 2024	Incumbent	BJP
Ministry of Finance	to be decided Chief Minister Additional Charge	05 December 2024	Incumbent	BJP
Ministry of Planning	to be decided Chief Minister Additional Charge	05 December 2024	Incumbent	BJP
Ministry of State Excise	to be decided Chief Minister Additional Charge	05 December 2024	Incumbent	BJP
Ministry of Water Resources	to be decided Chief Minister Additional Charge	05 December 2024	Incumbent	BJP
Ministry of Command Area Development	to be decided Chief Minister Additional Charge	05 December 2024	Incumbent	BJP
Ministry of Public Works (Excluding Public Undertakings)	Devendra Fadnavis; Chief Minister Additional Charge	05 December 2024	Incumbent	BJP
Ministry of Public Works (Including Public Undertakings)	Devendra Fadnavis; Chief Minister Additional Charge	05 December 2024	21 December 2024	BJP
Ministry of Public Works (Including Public Undertakings)	Eknath Shinde	21 December 2024	Incumbent	SHS
Ministry of Urban Development	Devendra Fadnavis; Chief Minister Additional Charge	05 December 2024	21 December 2024	BJP
Ministry of Urban Development	Eknath Shinde	21 December 2024	Incumbent	SHS
Ministry of Revenue	Devendra Fadnavis; Chief Minister Additional Charge	05 December 2024	Incumbent	BJP
Ministry of Industries	Devendra Fadnavis; Chief Minister Additional Charge	05 December 2024	Incumbent	BJP
Ministry of Mining Department	Devendra Fadnavis; Chief Minister Additional Charge	05 December 2024	Incumbent	BJP
Ministry of Marathi Language	Devendra Fadnavis; Chief Minister Additional Charge	05 December 2024	Incumbent	BJP
Ministry of Energy, New and Renewable Energy	Devendra Fadnavis; Chief Minister Additional Charge	05 December 2024	Incumbent	BJP
Ministry of Transport	Devendra Fadnavis; Chief Minister Additional Charge	05 December 2024	Incumbent	BJP
Ministry of Parliamentary Affairs	Devendra Fadnavis; Chief Minister Additional Charge	05 December 2024	Incumbent	BJP
Housing	Devendra Fadnavis; Chief Minister Additional Charge	05 December 2024	21 December 2024	BJP
Housing	Eknath Shinde	21 December 2024	Incumbent	SHS
Woman and Child Development	Devendra Fadnavis; Chief Minister Additional Charge	05 December 2024	Incumbent	BJP
Water Supply	Devendra Fadnavis; Chief Minister Additional Charge	05 December 2024	Incumbent	BJP
Sanitation	Devendra Fadnavis; Chief Minister Additional Charge	05 December 2024	Incumbent	BJP
Food, Civil Supplies and Consumer	Devendra Fadnavis; Chief Minister Additional Charge	05 December 2024	Incumbent	BJP
Tribal Development	Devendra Fadnavis; Chief Minister Additional Charge	05 December 2024	Incumbent	BJP
Environment and Climate Change	Devendra Fadnavis; Chief Minister Additional Charge	05 December 2024	Incumbent	BJP
Tourism	Devendra Fadnavis; Chief Minister Additional Charge	05 December 2024	Incumbent	BJP
Protocol	Devendra Fadnavis; Chief Minister Additional Charge	05 December 2024	Incumbent	BJP
Medical Education	Devendra Fadnavis; Chief Minister Additional Charge	05 December 2024	Incumbent	BJP
Cultural Affairs	Devendra Fadnavis; Chief Minister Additional Charge	05 December 2024	Incumbent	BJP
Higher and Technical Education	Devendra Fadnavis; Chief Minister Additional Charge	05 December 2024	Incumbent	BJP
Food and Drug Administration	Devendra Fadnavis; Chief Minister Additional Charge	05 December 2024	Incumbent	BJP
School Education	Devendra Fadnavis; Chief Minister Additional Charge	05 December 2024	Incumbent	BJP
Employment Guarantee	Devendra Fadnavis; Chief Minister Additional Charge	05 December 2024	Incumbent	BJP
Horticulture	Devendra Fadnavis; Chief Minister Additional Charge	05 December 2024	Incumbent	BJP
Co-operation	Devendra Fadnavis; Chief Minister Additional Charge	05 December 2024	Incumbent	BJP
Marketing	Devendra Fadnavis; Chief Minister Additional Charge	05 December 2024	Incumbent	BJP
Textiles	Devendra Fadnavis; Chief Minister Additional Charge	05 December 2024	Incumbent	BJP
Fisheries Department	Devendra Fadnavis; Chief Minister Additional Charge	05 December 2024	Incumbent	BJP
Ports Development	Devendra Fadnavis; Chief Minister Additional Charge	05 December 2024	Incumbent	BJP
Public Health and Family Welfare	Devendra Fadnavis; Chief Minister Additional Charge	05 December 2024	Incumbent	BJP
Other Backward Classes	Devendra Fadnavis; Chief Minister Additional Charge	05 December 2024	Incumbent	BJP
Agriculture	Devendra Fadnavis; Chief Minister Additional Charge	05 December 2024	Incumbent	BJP
Other Backward Bahujan Welfare	Devendra Fadnavis; Chief Minister Additional Charge	05 December 2024	Incumbent	BJP
Ex. Servicemen Welfare	Devendra Fadnavis; Chief Minister Additional Charge	05 December 2024	Incumbent	BJP
Socially and Educationally Backward Classes	Devendra Fadnavis; Chief Minister Additional Charge	05 December 2024	Incumbent	BJP
Social Justice	Devendra Fadnavis; Chief Minister Additional Charge	05 December 2024	Incumbent	BJP
Vimukta Jati	Devendra Fadnavis; Chief Minister Additional Charge	05 December 2024	Incumbent	BJP
Special Assistance	Devendra Fadnavis; Chief Minister Additional Charge	05 December 2024	Incumbent	BJP
Nomadic Tribes	Devendra Fadnavis; Chief Minister Additional Charge	05 December 2024	Incumbent	BJP
Minority Development and Aukaf	Devendra Fadnavis; Chief Minister Additional Charge	05 December 2024	Incumbent	BJP
Special Backward Classes Welfare	Devendra Fadnavis; Chief Minister Additional Charge	05 December 2024	Incumbent	BJP
Animal Husbandry	Devendra Fadnavis; Chief Minister Additional Charge	05 December 2024	Incumbent	BJP
Khar Land Development	Devendra Fadnavis; Chief Minister Additional Charge	05 December 2024	Incumbent	BJP
Dairy Development	Devendra Fadnavis; Chief Minister Additional Charge	05 December 2024	Incumbent	BJP
Earthquake Rehabilitation	Devendra Fadnavis; Chief Minister Additional Charge	05 December 2024	Incumbent	BJP
Sports and Youth Welfare	Devendra Fadnavis; Chief Minister Additional Charge	05 December 2024	Incumbent	BJP
Skill Development and Entrepreneurship	Devendra Fadnavis; Chief Minister Additional Charge	05 December 2024	Incumbent	BJP
Disaster Management	Devendra Fadnavis; Chief Minister Additional Charge	05 December 2024	Incumbent	BJP
Relief & Rehabilitation	Devendra Fadnavis; Chief Minister Additional Charge	05 December 2024	Incumbent	BJP
Majority Welfare Development	Devendra Fadnavis; Chief Minister Additional Charge	05 December 2024	Incumbent	BJP
Soil and Water Conservation	Devendra Fadnavis; Chief Minister Additional Charge	05 December 2024	Incumbent	BJP
Rural Development	Devendra Fadnavis; Chief Minister Additional Charge	05 December 2024	Incumbent	BJP
Labour	Devendra Fadnavis; Chief Minister Additional Charge	05 December 2024	Incumbent	BJP
Disability Welfare	Devendra Fadnavis; Chief Minister Additional Charge	05 December 2024	Incumbent	BJP

== State Public Sector Undertakings ==
1. Maharashtra Tourism Development Corporation Limited

== Secretaries to the Government of Maharashtra ==
Secretaries to the Government of Maharashtra
Ministry	Designation	Name_of_secretary	Background	Batch
Chief secretaries of Maharashtra Office	Chief Secretary	[[Shri Rajesh Aggarwal<ref>https://maharashtra.gov.in/Site/ViewDirectoryList]]	IAS officer	1989 <ref>https://maharashtra.gov.in/Site/ViewDirectoryList]
Governor of Maharashtra Office	Principal Secretary	Dr. Prashant Narnaware	IAS officer	
Governor of Maharashtra Office	Additional Principal Secretary	NA	IAS officer	
Governor of Maharashtra Office	Special Secretary	Shri. Rakesh Naithani	IAS officer	
Governor of Maharashtra Office	Secretary	NA	IAS officer	
Governor of Maharashtra Office	Deputy Secretary (Development Boards)	Smt. Shweta Singhal	IAS officer	
Governor of Maharashtra Office	Deputy Secretary (Admin and Education)	Smt. Prachi Jambhekar	IAS officer	
Governor of Maharashtra Office	Private Secretary	Smt. Archana Prasad Gaikwad	-	
Governor of Maharashtra Office	Additional PS	Shri. Kamal Ghildiyal	IPS officer	
Chief Minister's Office (Maharashtra)	Principal Adviser to the Chief Minister's Secretariat Government of Maharashtra	Sitaram Kunte	IAS officer	
Chief Minister's Office (Maharashtra)	Additional Chief Secretary	Ms. Ashwini Bhide	IAS officer	
Chief Minister's Office (Maharashtra)	Principal Secretary	Mr. Brijesh Singh	IPS officer	
Chief Minister's Office (Maharashtra)	Additional Principal Secretary			
Chief Minister's Office (Maharashtra)	Secretary			
Chief Minister's Office (Maharashtra)	Deputy Secretary			
Deputy Chief Minister's Office (Maharashtra)	Principal Secretary			
Deputy Chief Minister's Office (Maharashtra)	Additional Principal Secretary			
Deputy Chief Minister's Office (Maharashtra)	Secretary			
Deputy Chief Minister's Office (Maharashtra)	Deputy Secretary			
Maharashtra Legislature	General Secretary	Mr. Rajendra Bhagwat	IAS officer	-
Maharashtra Legislature	Secretary			
Maharashtra Legislature	Additional Secretary			
Maharashtra Legislative Council Secretaries Office	Principal Secretary			
Maharashtra Legislative Council Secretaries Office	Secretary			
Maharashtra Legislative Council Secretaries Office	Deputy Secretary			
Maharashtra Vidhan Sabha Secretaries Office	Principal Secretary			
Maharashtra Vidhan Sabha Secretaries Office	Secretary			
Maharashtra Vidhan Sabha Secretaries Office	Deputy Secretary			
Speaker & Deputy Speaker Maharashtra Vidhan Sabha Secretaries Office	Secretary (as Speaker)			
Speaker & Deputy Speaker Maharashtra Vidhan Sabha Secretaries Office	Deputy Secretary			
Speaker & Deputy Speaker Maharashtra Vidhan Sabha Secretaries Office	Secretary (as Deputy Speaker)			
Speaker & Deputy Speaker Maharashtra Vidhan Sabha Secretaries Office	Deputy Secretary			
Chairman & Deputy Chairman Maharashtra Vidhan Parishad Secretaries Office	Secretary (as Chairman)			
Chairman & Deputy Chairman Maharashtra Vidhan Parishad Secretaries Office	Deputy Secretary			
Chairman & Deputy Chairman Maharashtra Vidhan Parishad Secretaries Office	Secretary (as Deputy Chairman)			
Chairman & Deputy Chairman Maharashtra Vidhan Parishad Secretaries Office	Deputy Secretary			
Ministry of General Administration (Maharashtra)	Secretary	Dr. Nitin Kareer	IAS officer	
Ministry of General Administration (Maharashtra)	Chief Secretary	Smt. Sujata Saunik	IAS officer	
Ministry of General Administration (Maharashtra)	Deputy Secretary	Shri C.K More	State Service	
Ministry of Information and Public Relations (Maharashtra)	Additional Chief Secretary	Shri Sanjay Chahande	IAS officer	
Ministry of Information and Public Relations (Maharashtra)	Secretary			
Ministry of Information and Public Relations (Maharashtra)	Deputy Secretary			
Ministry of Information Technology (Maharashtra)	Principal Secretary			
Ministry of Information Technology (Maharashtra)	Secretary			
Ministry of Information Technology (Maharashtra)	Deputy Secretary			
Ministry of Law and Judiciary (Maharashtra)	Principal Secretary			
Ministry of Law and Judiciary (Maharashtra)	Secretary			
Ministry of Law and Judiciary (Maharashtra)	Deputy Secretary			
Ministry of Home Affairs (Maharashtra)	Principal Secretary			
Ministry of Home Affairs (Maharashtra)	Secretary			
Ministry of Home Affairs (Maharashtra)	Deputy Secretary			
Ministry of State Border Defence (Maharashtra)	Principal Secretary			
Ministry of State Border Defence (Maharashtra)	Secretary			
Ministry of State Border Defence (Maharashtra)	Deputy Secretary			
Ministry of Public Works (Excluding Public Undertakings) (Maharashtra)	Principal Secretary			
Ministry of Public Works (Excluding Public Undertakings) (Maharashtra)	Secretary			
Ministry of Public Works (Excluding Public Undertakings) (Maharashtra)	Deputy Secretary			
Ministry of Public Works (Including Public Undertakings) (Maharashtra)	Principal Secretary			
Ministry of Public Works (Including Public Undertakings) (Maharashtra)	Secretary			
Ministry of Public Works (Including Public Undertakings) (Maharashtra)	Deputy Secretary			
Ministry of Finance (Maharashtra)	Additional Chief Secretary	Vikas Chandra Rastogi	IAS officer	
Ministry of Finance (Maharashtra)	Principal Secretary			
Ministry of Finance (Maharashtra)	Secretary			
Ministry of Finance (Maharashtra)	Deputy Secretary			
Ministry of Revenue (Maharashtra)	Additional Chief Secretary	DR. NITIN KAREER	IAS officer	----
Ministry of Revenue (Maharashtra)	Join Secretary	SHRI. RAMESH CHAVAN	IAS officer	----
Ministry of Revenue (Maharashtra)	Deputy Secretary	Mr. Kiran Wadte	IAS officer	----
Ministry of Revenue (Maharashtra)	Under Secretary	SHRI. SHIVAJI CHAOURE	IAS officer	----
Ministry of Planning (Maharashtra)	Additional Chief Secretary	Shri Nitin Gadre	IAS officer	
Ministry of Planning (Maharashtra)	Principal Secretary			
Ministry of Planning (Maharashtra)	Secretary			
Ministry of Planning (Maharashtra)	Deputy Secretary			
Ministry of State Excise (Maharashtra)	Principal Secretary			
Ministry of State Excise (Maharashtra)	Secretary			
Ministry of State Excise (Maharashtra)	Deputy Secretary			
Ministry of Special Assistance (Maharashtra)	Principal Secretary			
Ministry of Special Assistance (Maharashtra)	Secretary			
Ministry of Special Assistance (Maharashtra)	Deputy Secretary			
Ministry of Social Justice (Maharashtra)	Principal Secretary			
Ministry of Social Justice (Maharashtra)	Secretary			
Ministry of Social Justice (Maharashtra)	Deputy Secretary			
Ministry of Forests Department (Maharashtra)	Additional Chief Secretary	DR. NITIN KAREER	IAS officer	----
Ministry of Forests Department (Maharashtra)	Join Secretary	SHRI. RAMESH CHAVAN	IAS officer	----
Ministry of Forests Department (Maharashtra)	Deputy Secretary	Mr. Kiran Wadte	IAS officer	----
Ministry of Forests Department (Maharashtra)	Under Secretary	SHRI. SHIVAJI CHAOURE	IAS officer	----
Ministry of Environment and Climate Change (Maharashtra)	Principal Secretary			
Ministry of Environment and Climate Change (Maharashtra)	Secretary			
Ministry of Environment and Climate Change (Maharashtra)	Deputy Secretary			
Ministry of Energy (Maharashtra)	Principal Secretary			
Ministry of Energy (Maharashtra)	Secretary			
Ministry of Energy (Maharashtra)	Deputy Secretary			
Ministry of Water Resources (Maharashtra)	Principal Secretary			
Ministry of Water Resources (Maharashtra)	Secretary			
Ministry of Water Resources (Maharashtra)	Deputy Secretary	Mr. C.K. More		
Ministry of Command Area Development (Maharashtra)	Principal Secretary			
Ministry of Command Area Development (Maharashtra)	Secretary			
Ministry of Command Area Development (Maharashtra)	Deputy Secretary			
Ministry of Public Health (Maharashtra)	Principal Secretary			
Ministry of Public Health (Maharashtra)	Secretary			
Ministry of Public Health (Maharashtra)	Deputy Secretary			
Ministry of Housing (Maharashtra)	Principal Secretary			
Ministry of Housing (Maharashtra)	Secretary			
Ministry of Housing (Maharashtra)	Deputy Secretary			
Ministry of Urban Development (Maharashtra)	Principal Secretary	Mr Bhushan Gagrani	IAS officer	
Ministry of Urban Development (Maharashtra)	Secretary			
Ministry of Urban Development (Maharashtra)	Deputy Secretary			
Ministry of Rural Development (Maharashtra)	Additional Chief Secretary	Mr. Rajesh Kumar	IAS officer	
Ministry of Rural Development (Maharashtra)	Principal Secretary			
Ministry of Rural Development (Maharashtra)	Secretary			
Ministry of Rural Development (Maharashtra)	Deputy Secretary			
Ministry of Labour (Maharashtra)	Principal Secretary			
Ministry of Labour (Maharashtra)	Secretary			
Ministry of Labour (Maharashtra)	Deputy Secretary			
Ministry of Co-operation (Maharashtra)	Principal Secretary			
Ministry of Co-operation (Maharashtra)	Secretary			
Ministry of Co-operation (Maharashtra)	Deputy Secretary			
Ministry of Marketing (Maharashtra)	Principal Secretary			
Ministry of Marketing (Maharashtra)	Secretary			
Ministry of Marketing (Maharashtra)	Deputy Secretary			
Ministry of Shipping (Maharashtra)	Principal Secretary	Shri. T K Ramachandran		
Ministry of Shipping (Maharashtra)	D.G. Shipping	Shri. Shyam Jaganathan	I.A.S	
Ministry of Shipping (Maharashtra)	Addl. Secretary	Shri. Rajesh Kumar Sinha		
Ministry of Shipping (Maharashtra)	PS to Central Minister	Shri. Amit Kumar		
Ministry of Shipping (Maharashtra)	Ministry of Industries (Maharashtra)	Principal Secretary		
Secretary	Ministry of Industries (Maharashtra)			
Deputy Secretary	Ministry of Industries (Maharashtra)			
Ministry of Mining Department (Maharashtra)	Principal Secretary			
Ministry of Mining Department (Maharashtra)	Secretary			
Ministry of Mining Department (Maharashtra)	Deputy Secretary			
Ministry of Textiles (Maharashtra)	Principal Secretary			
Ministry of Textiles (Maharashtra)	Secretary			
Ministry of Textiles (Maharashtra)	Deputy Secretary			
Ministry of Protocol (Maharashtra)	Principal Secretary			
Ministry of Protocol (Maharashtra)	Secretary			
Ministry of Protocol (Maharashtra)	Deputy Secretary			
Ministry of Tourism (Maharashtra)	Principal Secretary	Mr. Valsa Nair Singh	(IAS)	
Ministry of Tourism (Maharashtra)	Secretary			
Ministry of Tourism (Maharashtra)	Deputy Secretary			
Ministry of Cultural Affairs (Maharashtra)	Principal Secretary			
Ministry of Cultural Affairs (Maharashtra)	Secretary			
Ministry of Cultural Affairs (Maharashtra)	Deputy Secretary			
Ministry of Marathi Language (Maharashtra)	Principal Secretary			
Ministry of Marathi Language (Maharashtra)	Secretary			
Ministry of Marathi Language (Maharashtra)	Deputy Secretary			
Ministry of Water Supply (Maharashtra)	Principal Secretary			
Ministry of Water Supply (Maharashtra)	Secretary			
Ministry of Water Supply (Maharashtra)	Deputy Secretary			
Ministry of Soil and Water Conservation (Maharashtra)	Principal Secretary			
Ministry of Soil and Water Conservation (Maharashtra)	Secretary			
Ministry of Soil and Water Conservation (Maharashtra)	Deputy Secretary			
Ministry of Parliamentary Affairs (Maharashtra)	Principal Secretary			
Ministry of Parliamentary Affairs (Maharashtra)	Secretary			
Ministry of Parliamentary Affairs (Maharashtra)	Deputy Secretary			
Ministry of Sanitation (Maharashtra)	Principal Secretary			
Ministry of Sanitation (Maharashtra)	Secretary			
Ministry of Sanitation (Maharashtra)	Deputy Secretary			
Ministry of Woman and Child Development (Maharashtra)	Principal Secretary			
Ministry of Woman and Child Development (Maharashtra)	Secretary			
Ministry of Woman and Child Development (Maharashtra)	Deputy Secretary			
Ministry of School Education (Maharashtra)	Principal Secretary	Mr. Ranjit Singh Deol	IAS	
Ministry of School Education (Maharashtra)	Commissioner	Mr. Suraj Mandhare	IAS	
Ministry of School Education (Maharashtra)	Secretary			
Ministry of Medical Education (Maharashtra)	Principal Secretary			
Ministry of Medical Education (Maharashtra)	Secretary			
Ministry of Medical Education (Maharashtra)	Deputy Secretary			
Ministry of Higher and Technical Education (Maharashtra)	Principal Secretary	Shri. Vikas Chandra Rastogi	IAS	
Ministry of Higher and Technical Education (Maharashtra)	Secretary			
Ministry of Higher and Technical Education (Maharashtra)	Deputy Secretary			
Ministry of Skill Development and Entrepreneurship (Maharashtra)	Principal Secretary	Smt. Manisha Verma	IAS	
Ministry of Skill Development and Entrepreneurship (Maharashtra)	Joint Secretary	Shri. N. K. Bhosale	State Service	
Ministry of Skill Development and Entrepreneurship (Maharashtra)	Deputy Secretary	Shri. Shrinivas Shastri	State Service	
Ministry of Skill Development and Entrepreneurship (Maharashtra)	Deputy Secretary	Smt. Manjusha A. Karande	State Service	
Ministry of Sports and Youth Welfare (Maharashtra)	Principal Secretary	Mr. Ranjit Singh Deol	IAS	
Ministry of Sports and Youth Welfare (Maharashtra)	Commissioner	Mr. Om Prakash Bakoria	IAS	
Ministry of Sports and Youth Welfare (Maharashtra)	Deputy Secretary			
Ministry of Ex. Servicemen Welfare (Maharashtra)	Principal Secretary			
Ministry of Ex. Servicemen Welfare (Maharashtra)	Secretary			
Ministry of Ex. Servicemen Welfare (Maharashtra)	Deputy Secretary			
Ministry of Agriculture (Maharashtra)	Principal Secretary	Shri. Eknath Dawley	IAS	
Ministry of Agriculture (Maharashtra)	Commissioner	Mr. Dheeraj Kumar	IAS	
Ministry of Agriculture (Maharashtra)	Deputy Secretary			
Ministry of Food, Civil Supplies and Consumer Protection (Maharashtra)	Principal Secretary			
Ministry of Food, Civil Supplies and Consumer Protection (Maharashtra)	Secretary			
Ministry of Food, Civil Supplies and Consumer Protection (Maharashtra)	Deputy Secretary			
Ministry of Food and Drug Administration (Maharashtra)	Principal Secretary			
Ministry of Food and Drug Administration (Maharashtra)	Secretary			
Ministry of Food and Drug Administration (Maharashtra)	Deputy Secretary			
Ministry of Animal Husbandry Department (Maharashtra)	Principal Secretary			
Ministry of Animal Husbandry Department (Maharashtra)	Secretary			
Ministry of Animal Husbandry Department (Maharashtra)	Deputy Secretary			
Ministry of Dairy Development (Maharashtra)	Principal Secretary			
Ministry of Dairy Development (Maharashtra)	Secretary			
Ministry of Dairy Development (Maharashtra)	Deputy Secretary			
Ministry of Horticulture (Maharashtra)	Principal Secretary			
Ministry of Horticulture (Maharashtra)	Secretary			
Ministry of Horticulture (Maharashtra)	Deputy Secretary			
Ministry of Fisheries Department (Maharashtra)	Principal Secretary	Shri Jagdish Gupta	IAS	
Ministry of Fisheries Department (Maharashtra)	Commissioner	Dr. Atul Patne	IAS	
Ministry of Fisheries Department (Maharashtra)	Deputy Secretary			
Ministry of Disaster Management (Maharashtra)	Principal Secretary			
Ministry of Disaster Management (Maharashtra)	Secretary			
Ministry of Disaster Management (Maharashtra)	Deputy Secretary			
Ministry of Relief & Rehabilitation (Maharashtra)	Principal Secretary			
Ministry of Relief & Rehabilitation (Maharashtra)	Secretary			
Ministry of Relief & Rehabilitation (Maharashtra)	Deputy Secretary			
Ministry of Khar Land Development (Maharashtra)	Principal Secretary			
Ministry of Khar Land Development (Maharashtra)	Secretary			
Ministry of Khar Land Development (Maharashtra)	Deputy Secretary			
Ministry of Earthquake Rehabilitation (Maharashtra)	Principal Secretary			
Ministry of Earthquake Rehabilitation (Maharashtra)	Secretary			
Ministry of Earthquake Rehabilitation (Maharashtra)	Deputy Secretary			
Ministry of Employment Guarantee (Maharashtra)	Principal Secretary			
Ministry of Employment Guarantee (Maharashtra)	Secretary			
Ministry of Employment Guarantee (Maharashtra)	Deputy Secretary			
Ministry of Minority Development and Aukaf (Maharashtra)	Additional Chief Secretary	Smt. Jayshree Mukherjee	(IAS)	
Ministry of Minority Development and Aukaf (Maharashtra)	Joint secretary	Vacant Post	IAS	
Ministry of Minority Development and Aukaf (Maharashtra)	Deputy Secretary	Mr. D. M. Sonawane	-	
Ministry of Minority Development and Aukaf (Maharashtra)	Upper Secretary	Mr. M. P. Kudtarkar; Mrs. A. U. Patil; Mrs . A. P. Pednekar; Mr. S. Y. Barve	-	
Ministry of Majority Welfare Development (Maharashtra)	Principal Secretary			
Ministry of Majority Welfare Development (Maharashtra)	Secretary			
Ministry of Majority Welfare Development (Maharashtra)	Deputy Secretary			
Ministry of Tribal Development (Maharashtra)	Principal Secretary			
Ministry of Tribal Development (Maharashtra)	Secretary			
Ministry of Tribal Development (Maharashtra)	Deputy Secretary			
Ministry of Vimukta Jati (Maharashtra)	Principal Secretary			
Ministry of Vimukta Jati (Maharashtra)	Secretary			
Ministry of Vimukta Jati (Maharashtra)	Deputy Secretary			
Ministry of Nomadic Tribes (Maharashtra)	Principal Secretary			
Ministry of Nomadic Tribes (Maharashtra)	Secretary			
Ministry of Nomadic Tribes (Maharashtra)	Deputy Secretary			
Ministry of Other Backward Classes (Maharashtra)	Principal Secretary			
Ministry of Other Backward Classes (Maharashtra)	Secretary			
Ministry of Other Backward Classes (Maharashtra)	Deputy Secretary			
Ministry of Other Backward Bahujan Welfare (Maharashtra)	Principal Secretary			
Ministry of Other Backward Bahujan Welfare (Maharashtra)	Secretary			
Ministry of Other Backward Bahujan Welfare (Maharashtra)	Deputy Secretary			
Ministry of Special Backward Classes Welfare (Maharashtra)	Principal Secretary			
Ministry of Special Backward Classes Welfare (Maharashtra)	Secretary			
Ministry of Special Backward Classes Welfare (Maharashtra)	Deputy Secretary			
Ministry of Socially and Educationally Backward Classes (Maharashtra)	Principal Secretary			
Ministry of Socially and Educationally Backward Classes (Maharashtra)	Secretary			
Ministry of Socially and Educationally Backward Classes (Maharashtra)	Deputy Secretary			
Ministry of Disability Welfare (Maharashtra)	Principal Secretary			
Ministry of Disability Welfare (Maharashtra)	Secretary			
Ministry of Disability Welfare (Maharashtra)	Deputy Secretary			
Leader of The House Maharashtra Vidhan Parishad secretaries of Office	Secretary			
Leader of The House Maharashtra Vidhan Parishad secretaries of Office	Deputy Secretary			
Leader of The House Maharashtra Vidhan Sabha secretaries of Office	Secretary			
Leader of The House Maharashtra Vidhan Sabha secretaries of Office	Deputy Secretary			
Deputy Leader of The House Maharashtra Vidhan Parishad secretaries of Office	Secretary			
Deputy Leader of The House Maharashtra Vidhan Parishad secretaries of Office	Deputy Secretary			
Deputy Leader of The House Maharashtra Vidhan Sabha secretaries of Office	Secretary			
Deputy Leader of The House Maharashtra Vidhan Sabha secretaries of Office	Deputy Secretary			
Leader of the Opposition Maharashtra Vidhan Parishad secretaries of Office	Secretary			
Leader of the Opposition Maharashtra Vidhan Parishad secretaries of Office	Deputy Secretary			
Leader of the Opposition Maharashtra Vidhan Sabha secretaries of Office	Secretary			
Leader of the Opposition Maharashtra Vidhan Sabha secretaries of Office	Deputy Secretary			

== See also ==
- Maharashtra Police
- Maharashtra Cyber
- Council of Ministers (Maharashtra)
- Guardian Ministers (Maharashtra)
