= Ministry of Labour (Maharashtra) =

Maharashtra government ministry responsible for Labour

Ministry of Labour Government of Maharashtra
- मंत्रालय कामगार विभाग, महाराष्ट्र शासन
- Seal of the state of Maharashtra

- Building of Administrative Headquarters of Mumbai

Ministry overview
- Jurisdiction: (India) Maharashtra
- Headquarters: Mantralay, Mumbai
- Minister responsible: Akash Pandurang Fundkar, Cabinet Minister
- Deputy Minister responsible: Ashish Jaiswal, Minister of State
- Ministry executive: (IAS)
- Parent department: Government of Maharashtra

The Ministry of Labour is a Ministry of the Government of Maharashtra. state.

The Ministry is headed by a cabinet level Minister. Akash Pandurang Fundkar is Current Minister of Labour Government of Maharashtra.

== Head office ==
Minister of Labour मंत्री कामगार विभाग
- Emblem of India

- Flag of India
- Incumbent; Akash Pandurang Fundkar since 21 December 2024
- Ministry of Labour (Maharashtra)
- Style: The Honourable
- Abbreviation: Cabinet Minister
- Member of: State Cabinet
- Reports to: Chief Minister, Maharashtra Legislature
- Seat: Mantralaya, Mumbai
- Appointer: Governor on the advice of the Chief Minister
- Term length: 5 years
- Precursor: Hasan Mushrif; (2019- 2022)
- Inaugural holder: M. G. Maney; (1960-1962)
- Formation: 1 May 1960
- Deputy: Ashish Jaiswal

== Cabinet Ministers ==
No.	Portrait	Minister (Constituency)	Term of office			Political party	Ministry	Chief Minister
No.	Portrait	Minister (Constituency)	From	To	Period	Political party	Ministry	Chief Minister
Minister of Labour
01		Shantilal Shah (MLA for Vile Parle Constituency No. 177- Mumbai Suburban District (Legislative Assembly)	01 May 1960	07 March 1962	1 year, 310 days	Indian National Congress	Yashwantrao I	Yashwantrao Chavan
02		M. G. Mane (MLC for Elected by MLAs Constituency No. 10 - Pune District) (Legislative Council)	08 March 1962	19 November 1962	256 days	Indian National Congress	Yashwantrao II	Yashwantrao Chavan
03		M. G. Mane (MLC for Elected by MLAs Constituency No. 10 - Pune District) (Legislative Council)	20 November 1962	24 November 1963	1 year, 4 days	Indian National Congress	Kannamwar l	Marotrao Kannamwar
04		Parashuram Krishnaji Sawant (MLA for Chiplun Constituency No. 265- Ratnagiri District) (Legislative Assembly) (Interim Chief Minister)	25 November 1962	04 December 1963	9 days	Indian National Congress	Sawant	Parashuram Krishnaji Sawant
05		Narendra Mahipati Tidke (MLA for Savner Constituency No. 49- Nagpur District) (Legislative Assembly)	05 December 1963	01 March 1967	3 years, 86 days	Indian National Congress	Vasantrao I	Vasantrao Naik
06		Madhukar Dhanaji Chaudhari (MLA for Raver Constituency No. 11- Jalgaon District) (Legislative Assembly)	01 March 1967	27 October 1969	2 years, 240 days	Indian National Congress	Vasantrao II	Vasantrao Naik
07		Pratibha Patil (MLA for Jalgaon City Constituency No. 13- Jalgaon District) (Legislative Assembly)	27 October 1969	13 March 1972	2 years, 138 days	Indian National Congress	Vasantrao II	Vasantrao Naik
08		Vasantrao Patil (MLC for Elected by MLAs Constituency No. 20 - Sangli District) (Legislative Council)	13 March 1972	04 April 1973	1 year, 32 days	Indian National Congress	Vasantrao III	Vasantrao Naik
09		Shankarrao Chavan (MLA for Bhokar Constituency No. 85- Nanded District) (Legislative Assembly)	04 April 1973	17 Match; 1974	347 days	Indian National Congress	Vasantrao III	Vasantrao Naik
10		Rafique Zakaria (MLC for Elected by MLAs Constituency No. 16 - Mumbai Suburban District) (Legislative Council)	17 Match; 1974	21 February 1975	341 days	Indian National Congress	Vasantrao III	Vasantrao Naik
11		Shankarrao Bajirao Patil (MLA for Indapur Constituency No. 220- Pune District (Legislative Assembly)	21 February 1975	16 April 1977	2 years, 54 days	Indian National Congress	Shankarrao I	Shankarrao Chavan
12		Shankarrao Bajirao Patil (MLA for Indapur Constituency No. 220- Pune District (Legislative Assembly)	17 April 1977	07 March 1978	1 year, 324 days	Indian National Congress	Vasantdada I	Vasantdada Patil
13		Sharad Pawar (MLA for Baramati Constituency No. 201- Pune District) (Legislative Assembly)	07 March 1978	18 July 1978	133 days	Indian National Congress	Vasantdada II	Vasantdada Patil
14		Sushilkumar Shinde (MLA for Solapur South Constituency No. 251- Solapur District) (Legislative Assembly)	18 July 1978	18 February 1980	1 year, 215 days	Indian Congress (Socialist)	Pawar I	Sharad Pawar
15		Babasaheb Bhosale (MLA for Nehrunagar Constituency No. 172- Mumbai Suburban District) (Legislative Assembly)	09 June 1980	21 January 1982	1 year, 226 days	Indian National Congress	Antulay	Abdul Rahman Antulay
16		Bhagwantrao Gaikwad (MLA for Kalameshwar Constituency No. 52- Nagpur District (Legislative Assembly)	21 January 1982	02 February 1983	1 year, 12 days	Indian National Congress	Bhosale	Babasaheb Bhosale
17		S. M. I. Aseer (MLA for Ahmednagar South Constituency No. 223- Ahmednagar District (Legislative Assembly)	07 February 1983	05 March 1985	2 years, 26 days	Indian National Congress	Vasantdada III	Vasantdada Patil
18		Narendra Mahipati Tidke (MLA for Savner Constituency No. 49- Nagpur District) (Legislative Assembly)	12 March 1985	03 June 1985	83 days	Indian National Congress	Vasantdada IV	Vasantdada Patil
19		Narendra Mahipati Tidke (MLA for Savner Constituency No. 49- Nagpur District) (Legislative Assembly)	03 June 1985	12 March 1986	282 days	Indian National Congress	Nilangekar	Shivajirao Patil Nilangekar
20		Bhagwantrao Gaikwad (MLA for Dindori Constituency No. 122- Nashik District (Legislative Assembly)	12 March 1986	26 June 1988	2 years, 106 days	Indian National Congress	Shankarrao II	Shankarrao Chavan
21		Ramrao Adik (MLC for Elected by MLAs Constituency No. 05 - Ahmednagar District) (Legislative Council)	26 June 1988	03 March 1990	1 year, 250 days	Indian National Congress	Pawar II	Sharad Pawar
22		Narendra Marutrao Kamble (MLC for Elected by Governor Nominated No. 10 - Mumbai City District) (Legislative Council)	03 March 1990	25 June 1991	1 year, 114 days	Indian National Congress	Pawar III	Sharad Pawar
23		Rohidas Patil (MLA for Dhule Constituency No. 07- Dhule District (Legislative Assembly)	25 June 1991	22 February 1993	1 year, 242 days	Indian National Congress	Sudhakarrao	Sudhakarrao Naik
24		Sarawan Parate (MLC for Elected by MLAs Constituency No. 14 - Kolhapur District) (Legislative Council)	06 March 1993	18 November 1994	1 year, 257 days	Indian National Congress	Pawar IV	Sharad Pawar
25		Sabir Shaikh (MLA for Ambarnath Constituency No. 140- Thane District) (Legislative Assembly)	14 March 1995	01 February 1999	3 years, 324 days	Shiv Sena	Joshi	Manohar Joshi
26		Sabir Shaikh (MLA for Ambarnath Constituency No. 140- Thane District) (Legislative Assembly)	01 February 1999	11 May 1999	99 days	Shiv Sena	Rane	Narayan Rane
27		Babanrao Gholap (MLA for Deolali Constituency No. 126- Pune District) (Legislative Assembly)	11 May 1999	17 October 1999	159 days	Shiv Sena	Rane	Narayan Rane
28		Husain Dalwai (MLA for Ratnagiri Khed Constituency No. 266- Ratnagiri District) (Legislative Assembly)	19 October 1999	16 January 2003	3 years, 89 days	Indian National Congress	Deshmukh I	Vilasrao Deshmukh
29		Sushilkumar Shinde (MLA for Solapur South Constituency No. 251- Solapur District) (Legislative Assembly) (Chief Minister)	18 January 2003	01 November 2004	1 year, 295 days	Indian National Congress	Sushilkumar	Sushilkumar Shinde
30		R. R. Patil (MLA for Tasgaon-Kavathe Mahankal Constituency No. 287- Sangli District) (Legislative Assembly) (Deputy Chief Minister)	01 November 2004	09 November 2004	8 days	Nationalist Congress Party	Deshmukh II	Vilasrao Deshmukh
31		Nawab Malik (MLA for Anushakti Nagar Constituency No. 172- Mumbai Suburban District) (Legislative Assembly)	09 November 2004	01 December 2008	4 years, 22 days	Nationalist Congress Party	Deshmukh II	Vilasrao Deshmukh
32		Nawab Malik (MLA for Anushakti Nagar Constituency No. 172- Mumbai Suburban District) (Legislative Assembly)	08 December 2008	06 November 2009	333 days	Indian National Congress	Ashok I	Ashok Chavan
33		Ramraje Naik Nimbalkar (MLC for Elected by MLAs Constituency No. 14 - Satara District) (Legislative Council)	07 November 2009	10 November 2010	1 year, 3 days	Nationalist Congress Party	Ashok II	Ashok Chavan
34		Hasan Mushrif (MLA for Kagal Constituency No. 273- Kolhapur District) (Legislative Assembly)	11 November 2010	26 September 2014	3 years, 319 days	Nationalist Congress Party	Prithviraj	Prithviraj Chavan
35		Prakash Mehta (MLA for Ghatkopar East Constituency No. 170- Mumbai Suburban District (Legislative Assembly)	31 October 2014	08 July 2016	1 year, 251 days	Bharatiya Janata Party	Fadnavis I	Devendra Fadnavis
36		Sambhaji Patil Nilangekar Sambhaji Patil Nilangekar (MLA for Nilanga Constituency No. 238- Latur District (Legislative Assembly)	08 July 2016	16 June 2019	2 years, 343 days	Bharatiya Janata Party	Fadnavis I	Devendra Fadnavis
37		Sanjay Kute (MLA for Jalgaon (Jamod) Constituency No. 27- Buldhana District (Legislative Assembly)	16 June 2019	12 November 2019	149 days	Bharatiya Janata Party	Fadnavis I	Devendra Fadnavis
38		Devendra Fadnavis (MLA for Nagpur South West Constituency No. 52- Nagpur District) (Legislative Assembly) (Chief_Minister); In Charge	23 November 2019	28 November 2019	5 days	Bharatiya Janata Party	Fadnavis II	Devendra Fadnavis
39		Jayant Patil (MLA for Islampur Constituency No. 283- Sangli District) (Legislative Assembly)	28 November 2019	30 December 2019	32 days	Nationalist Congress Party	Thackeray	Uddhav Thackeray
40		Dilip Walse-Patil (MLA for Ambegaon Constituency No. 196- Pune District) (Legislative Assembly)	30 December 2019	05 April 2021	1 year, 96 days	Nationalist Congress Party	Thackeray	Uddhav Thackeray
41		Hasan Mushrif (MLA for Kagal Constituency No. 273- Kolhapur District) (Legislative Assembly)	05 April 2021	29 June 2022	1 year, 85 days	Nationalist Congress Party	Thackeray	Uddhav Thackeray
42		Eknath Shinde (MLA for Kopri-Pachpakhadi Constituency No. 147- Thane District) (Legislative Assembly) (Chief Minister); In Charge	30 June 2022	14 August 2022	45 days	Shiv Sena (2022–present)	Eknath	Eknath Shinde
43		Suresh Khade (MLA for Miraj Constituency No. 281- Sangli District (Legislative Assembly)	14 August 2022	26 November 2024	2 years, 135 days	Bharatiya Janata Party	Eknath	Eknath Shinde
44		Devendra Fadnavis (MLA for Nagpur South West Constituency No. 52- Nagpur District) (Legislative Assembly) (Chief_Minister); In Charge	05 December 2024	21 December 2024	16 days	Bharatiya Janata Party	Fadnavis III	Devendra Fadnavis
45		Akash Pandurang Fundkar (MLA for Khamgaon Constituency No. 26- Buldhana District) (Legislative Assembly)	21 December 2024	Incumbent	1 year, 261 days	Bharatiya Janata Party	Fadnavis III	Devendra Fadnavis

== Ministers of State ==
No.	Portrait	Deputy Minister (Constituency)	Term of office			Political party	Ministry	Minister	Chief Minister
No.	Portrait	Deputy Minister (Constituency)	From	To	Period	Political party	Ministry	Minister	Chief Minister
Deputy Minister of Labour
Vacant			23 November 2019	28 November 2019	5 days	NA	Fadnavis II	Devendra Fadnavis	Devendra Fadnavis
01		Omprakash Babarao Kadu (MLA for Achalpur Constituency No. 42- Amravati District) (Legislative Assembly)	30 December 2019	27 June 2022	2 years, 179 days	Prahar Janshakti Party Supported Party (Shiv Sena)	Thackeray	Dilip Walse-Patil (2019 -2021); Hasan Mushrif (2021-2022)	Uddhav Thackeray
02		Satej Patil (MLC for Elected by Kolhapur Local Authorities Constituency No. 06 - Kolhapur District) (Legislative Council); Additional_Charge	27 June 2022	29 June 2022	2 days	Indian National Congress	Thackeray	Dilip Walse-Patil (2019 -2021); Hasan Mushrif (2021-2022)	Uddhav Thackeray
Vacant			30 June 2022	26 November 2024	2 years, 149 days	NA	Eknath	Eknath Shinde (2022 - 2022); Suresh Khade (2022 – 2024)	Eknath Shinde
03		Ashish Jaiswal (MLA for Ramtek Constituency No. 59- Nagpur District) (Legislative Assembly)	21 December 2024	Incumbent	1 year, 261 days	Shiv Sena (Shinde Group)	Fadnavis III	Akash Pandurang Fundkar (2024 – Present)	Devendra Fadnavis
