= Ministry of Social Justice (Maharashtra) =

Indian government ministry responsible for affirmative action

Ministry of Social Justice, Government of Maharashtra
- मंत्रालय सामाजिक न्याय विभाग, महाराष्ट्र शासन
- Seal of the state of Maharashtra

- Building of Administrative Headquarters of Mumbai

Ministry overview
- Formed: 1928
- Jurisdiction: (India) Maharashtra
- Headquarters: Mantralay, Mumbai
- Minister responsible: Sanjay Shirsat, Cabinet Minister
- Deputy Minister responsible: Madhuri Misal, Minister of State
- Ministry executive: Shyam Tagare (IAS)
- Parent department: Government of Maharashtra
- Website: sjsa.maharashtra.gov.in/en

The Ministry of Social Justice is a ministry of the Government of Maharashtra. It is responsible for welfare, social justice and empowerment of disadvantaged and marginalized sections of society.

The Ministry is headed by a cabinet level minister. Sanjay Shirsat is current Minister of Social Justice.

== Head office ==
Minister of Social Justice सामाजिक न्याय मंत्री
- Emblem of India

- Flag of India

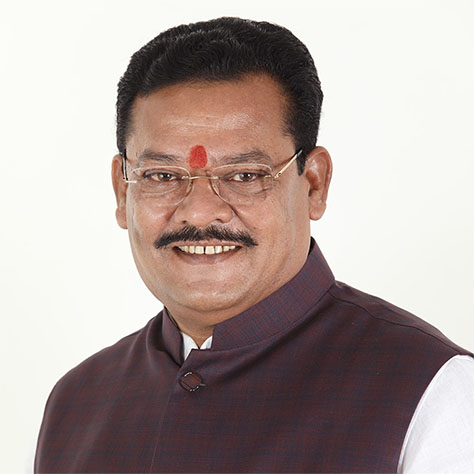
- Incumbent; Sanjay Shirsat since 21 December 2024
- Ministry of Social Justice (Maharashtra)
- Style: The Honourable
- Abbreviation: Cabinet Minister
- Member of: State Cabinet
- Reports to: Chief Minister, Maharashtra Legislature
- Seat: Mantralaya, Mumbai
- Appointer: Governor On The Advice Of The Chief Minister
- Term length: 5 years
- Precursor: Devendra Fadnavis (2024-2024)
- Inaugural holder: Niramala Raje Bhosale (1960-1962)
- Formation: 1 May 1960
- Deputy: Madhuri Misal

== Cabinet Ministers ==
No.	Portrait	Minister (Constituency)	Term of office			Political party	Ministry	Chief Minister
No.	Portrait	Minister (Constituency)	From	To	Period	Political party	Ministry	Chief Minister
Minister of Social Welfare or Social Justice
01		T. R. Narawane (MLA for Kurla Constituency No. 174- Mumbai Suburban District) (Legislative Assembly)	01 May 1960	07 March 1962	1 year, 310 days	Indian National Congress	Yashwantrao I	Yashwantrao Chavan
02		Niramala Raje Bhosale (MLA for Satara Constituency No. 268- Satara District) (Legislative Assembly)	08 March 1962	19 November 1962	256 days	Indian National Congress	Yashwantrao II	Yashwantrao Chavan
03		Niramala Raje Bhosale (MLA for Satara Constituency No. 268- Satara District) (Legislative Assembly)	20 November 1962	24 November 1963	1 year, 4 days	Indian National Congress	Kannamwar l	Marotrao Kannamwar
04		P. K. Sawant (MLA for Chiplun Constituency No. 265- Ratnagiri District) (Legislative Assembly) (Interim Chief Minister)	25 November 1962	04 December 1963	9 days	Indian National Congress	Sawant I	P. K. Sawant
05		Niramala Raje Bhosale (MLA for Satara Constituency No. 268- Satara District) (Legislative Assembly)	05 December 1963	01 March 1967	3 years, 86 days	Indian National Congress	Vasantrao I	Vasantrao Naik
06		Pratibha Patil (MLA for Jalgaon City Constituency No. 13- Jalgaon District) (Legislative Assembly)	01 March 1967	13 March 1972	5 years, 12 days	Indian National Congress	Vasantrao II	Vasantrao Naik
07		Vasantrao Naik (MLA for Pusad Constituency No. 81- Yavatmal District) (Legislative Assembly)	13 March 1972	04 April 1973	1 year, 32 days	Indian National Congress	Vasantrao III	Vasantrao Naik
08		Pratibha Patil (MLA for Jalgaon City Constituency No. 13- Jalgaon District) (Legislative Assembly)	04 April 1973	17 Match; 1974	347 days	Indian National Congress	Vasantrao III	Vasantrao Naik
09		Rafique Zakaria (MLC for Elected by MLAs Constituency No. 16 - Mumbai Suburban District) (Legislative Council)	17 Match; 1974	21 February 1975	341 days	Indian National Congress	Vasantrao III	Vasantrao Naik
10		Pratibha Patil (MLA for Jalgaon City Constituency No. 13- Jalgaon District) (Legislative Assembly)	21 February 1975	16 April 1977	2 years, 54 days	Indian National Congress	Shankarrao I	Shankarrao Chavan
12		Dadasaheb Rupwate (MLC for Elected by MLAs Constituency No. 11 - Ahmednagar District) (Legislative Council)	17 April 1977	07 March 1978	1 year, 324 days	Indian National Congress	Vasantdada I	Vasantdada Patil
13		Ramrao Adik (MLC for Elected by MLAs Constituency No. 05 - Ahmednagar District) (Legislative Council)	07 March 1978	18 July 1978	133 days	Indian National Congress (U)	Vasantdada II	Vasantdada Patil
14		Govindrao Adik (MLA for Shrirampur Constituency No. 220- Ahmednagar District) (Legislative Assembly)	18 July 1978	17 February 1980	1 year, 214 days	Indian Congress (Socialist)	Pawar I	Sharad Pawar
15		Pramilaben Yagnik (MLC for Governor Nominated No. 11 - Nagpur District) (Legislative Council)	09 June 1980	09 March 1981	273 days	Indian National Congress	Antulay	Abdul Rahman Antulay
16		Surupsingh Hirya Naik (MLA for Navapur Constituency No. 04- Nandurbar District) (Legislative Assembly)	09 March 1981	21 January 1982	318 days	Indian National Congress	Antulay	Abdul Rahman Antulay
17		Surupsingh Hirya Naik (MLA for Navapur Constituency No. 04- Nandurbar District) (Legislative Assembly)	21 January 1982	02 February 1983	1 year, 12 days	Indian National Congress	Bhosale	Babasaheb Bhosale
17		Pratibha Patil (MLA for Jalgaon City Constituency No. 13- Jalgaon District) (Legislative Assembly)	07 February 1983	05 March 1985	2 years, 26 days	Indian National Congress	Vasantdada III	Vasantdada Patil
18		Sudhakarrao Naik (MLA for Pusad Constituency No. 81- Yavatmal District) (Legislative Assembly)	12 March 1985	03 June 1985	83 days	Indian National Congress	Vasantdada IV	Vasantdada Patil
19		Sudhakarrao Naik (MLA for Pusad Constituency No. 81- Yavatmal District) (Legislative Assembly)	03 June 1985	12 March 1986	282 days	Indian National Congress	Nilangekar	Shivajirao Patil Nilangekar
20		Balachandra Bhai Sawant (MLC for Elected by MLAs Constituency No. 09 - Ratnagiri District) (Legislative Council)	12 March 1986	26 June 1988	2 years, 106 days	Indian National Congress	Shankarrao II	Shankarrao Chavan
21		Sudhakarrao Naik (MLA for Pusad Constituency No. 81- Yavatmal District) (Legislative Assembly)	26 June 1988	02 January 1989	221 days	Indian National Congress	Pawar II	Sharad Pawar
22		Narendra Marutrao Kamble (MLC for Elected by Governor Nominated No. 10 - Mumbai City District) (Legislative Council)	02 January 1989	03 March 1990	1 year, 60 days	Indian National Congress	Pawar II	Sharad Pawar
23		Ramdas Athawale (MLC for Elected by MLAs Constituency No. 11 - Sangli District) (Legislative Council)	04 March 1990	25 June 1991	1 year, 113 days	Republican Party of India (Athawale)	Pawar III	
24		Ramdas Athawale (MLC for Elected by MLAs Constituency No. 11 - Sangli District) (Legislative Council)	25 June 1991	22 February 1993	1 year, 242 days	Republican Party of India (Athawale)	Sudhakarrao	Sudhakarrao Naik
25		Ramdas Athawale (MLC for Elected by MLAs Constituency No. 11 - Sangli District) (Legislative Council)	06 March 1993	14 March 1995	2 years, 8 days	Republican Party of India (Athawale)	Pawar IV	Sharad Pawar
26		Babanrao Gholap (MLA for Deolali Constituency No. 126- Pune District) (Legislative Assembly)	14 March 1995	31 January 1999	3 years, 323 days	Shiv Sena	Joshi	Manohar Joshi
27		Babanrao Gholap (MLA for Deolali Constituency No. 126- Pune District) (Legislative Assembly)	01 February 1999	17 October 1999	258 days	Shiv Sena	Rane	Narayan Rane
28		Chhagan Bhujbal (MLC for Elected by MLAs Constituency No. 09 - Mumbai City District) (Legislative Council) (Deputy Chief Minister)	19 October 1999	03 May 2001	1 year, 194 days	Nationalist Congress Party	Deshmukh I	Vilasrao Deshmukh
29		Jaywantrao Awale (MLA for Vadgaon Maval Constituency No. 192- Pune District (Legislative Assembly)	03 May 2001	16 January 2003	1 year, 257 days	Indian National Congress	Deshmukh I	Vilasrao Deshmukh
30		Chhagan Bhujbal (MLC for Elected by MLAs Constituency No. 09 - Mumbai City District) (Legislative Council) (Deputy Chief Minister	18 January 2003	23 December 2003	346 days	Nationalist Congress Party	Sushilkumar	Sushilkumar Shinde
31		Chhagan Bhujbal (MLC for Elected by MLAs Constituency No. 09 - Mumbai City District) (Legislative Council)	23 December 2003	01 November 2004	314 days	Nationalist Congress Party	Sushilkumar	Sushilkumar Shinde
32		Vilasrao Deshmukh (MLA for Latur City Constituency No. 235- Latur District) (Legislative Assembly) (Chief Minister)	01 November 2004	09 November 2004	8 days	Indian National Congress	Deshmukh II	Vilasrao Deshmukh
33		Chandrakant Handore (MLA for Chembur Constituency No. 173- Mumbai Suburban District (Legislative Assembly)	09 November 2004	01 December 2008	4 years, 22 days	Indian National Congress	Deshmukh II	Vilasrao Deshmukh
34		Chandrakant Handore (MLA for Chembur Constituency No. 173- Mumbai Suburban District (Legislative Assembly)	08 December 2008	06 November 2009	333 days	Indian National Congress	Ashok I	Ashok Chavan
35		Shivajirao Moghe (MLA for Arni Constituency No. 80- Yavatmal District) (Legislative Assembly)	07 November 2009	10 November 2010	1 year, 3 days	Indian National Congress	Ashok II	Ashok Chavan
36		Patangrao Kadam (MLA for Palus-Kadegaon Constituency No. 285- Sangli District) (Legislative Assembly)	11 November 2010	26 September 2014	3 years, 319 days	Indian National Congress	Prithviraj	Prithviraj Chavan
37		Vishnu Savara (MLA for Vikramgad Constituency No. 129- Palghar District) (Legislative Assembly)	31 October 2014	05 December 2014	35 days	Bharatiya Janata Party	Fadnavis I	Devendra Fadnavis
38		Rajkumar Badole (MLA for Arjuni-Morgaon Constituency No. 63- Gondiya District) (Legislative Assembly)	05 December 2014	16 June 2019	4 years, 193 days	Bharatiya Janata Party	Fadnavis I	Devendra Fadnavis
39		Suresh Khade (MLA for Miraj) Constituency No. 281- Sangli District (Legislative Assembly)	16 June 2019	12 November 2019	149 days	Bharatiya Janata Party	Fadnavis I	Devendra Fadnavis
40		Devendra Fadnavis (MLA for Nagpur South West Constituency No. 52- Nagpur District) (Legislative Assembly) (Chief Minister) (In Charge)	23 November 2019	28 November 2019	5 days	Bharatiya Janata Party	Fadnavis II	Devendra Fadnavis
41		Chhagan Bhujbal (MLA for Yevla Constituency No. 119- Nashik District) (Legislative Assembly)	28 November 2019	30 December 2019	32 days	Nationalist Congress Party	Thackeray	Uddhav Thackeray
42		Dhananjay Munde (MLA for Parli Constituency No. 233- Beed District) (Legislative Assembly)	30 December 2019	29 June 2022	2 years, 181 days	Nationalist Congress Party	Thackeray	Uddhav Thackeray
43		Eknath Shinde (MLA for Kopri-Pachpakhadi Constituency No. 147- Thane District) (Legislative Assembly) (Chief Minister) (In Charge)	30 June 2022	14 August 2022	45 days	Shiv Sena (2022–present)	Eknath	Eknath Shinde
44		Eknath Shinde (MLA for Kopri-Pachpakhadi Constituency No. 147- Thane District) (Legislative Assembly) (Chief Minister)	14 August 2022	26 November 2024	2 years, 104 days	Shiv Sena (2022–present)	Eknath	Eknath Shinde
45		Devendra Fadnavis (MLA for Nagpur South West Constituency No. 52- Nagpur District) (Legislative Assembly) (Chief_Minister); In Charge	05 December 2024	21 December 2024	16 days	Bharatiya Janata Party	Fadnavis III	Devendra Fadnavis
46		Sanjay Shirsat (MLA for Aurangabad West Constituency No. 108- Chhatrapati Sambhaji Nagar District Also Previously Known Aurangabad District (Legislative Assembly)	21 December 2024	Incumbent	1 year, 261 days	Shiv Sena (2022–present)	Fadnavis III	Devendra Fadnavis

== Ministers of State ==
No.	Portrait	Deputy Minister (Constituency)	Term of office			Political party	Ministry	Minister	Chief Minister
No.	Portrait	Deputy Minister (Constituency)	From	To	Period	Political party	Ministry	Minister	Chief Minister
Deputy Minister of Social Justice
Vacant			23 November 2019	28 November 2019	5 days	NA	Fadnavis II	Devendra Fadnavis	Devendra Fadnavis
01		Vishwajeet Kadam (MLA for Palus-Kadegaon Constituency No. 285- Sangli District) (Legislative Assembly)	30 December 2019	29 June 2022	2 years, 181 days	Indian National Congress	Thackeray	Dhananjay Munde	Uddhav Thackeray
Vacant			30 June 2022	26 November 2024	2 years, 149 days	NA	Eknath	Eknath Shinde	Eknath Shinde
02		Madhuri Misal (MLA for Parvati Constituency No. 212- Pune District) (Legislative Assembly)	21 December 2024	incumbent	1 year, 261 days	Bharatiya Janata Party	Fadnavis III	Sanjay Shirsat	Devendra Fadnavis

== History ==
The ministry was formed in 1928. The Welfare Department was established in 1932. The Social Welfare Directorate was created on 23 September 1957.

== Institutions ==
Several institutes are started by the ministry for marginalized sections of society.

- Ashram Schools
- Residential Schools
- Hostels
- Institutions for person with disability
