= Mantralaya, Mumbai =

Govt office in Maharashtra

Mantralaya
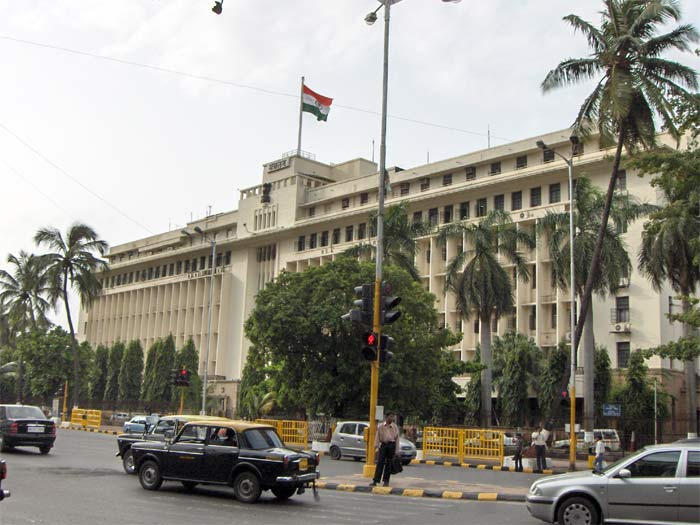
- Mantralaya as seen from street.
- Interactive map of the Mantralaya area

General information
- Location: Main Building, Madam Cama Road, Mantralaya Road, Mumbai - 400032, Churchgate, Mumbai, Maharashtra, India
- Construction started: 1955
- Client: Government of Maharashtra

Technical details
- Floor count: 7

Design and construction
- Architect: Raja Aederi

Website
- https://www.maharashtra.gov.in/1125/Home

Mantralaya is the administrative headquarters of the Government of Maharashtra in the city of Mumbai, India built in 1955. Mantralaya was earlier known as Sachivalaya. (Sachiv- Secretary, Alaya- House, meaning House of Secretaries, called Secretariat). The headquarters of most State Governments in India are called Secretariats. However, since Ministers (Mantri in Marathi) also sit in the same building and to underline the fact that Ministers are powerful in a democracy, the name was changed to Mantralaya in the early eighties.

Mantralay of Mumbai, Administrative Headquarters of the State Government of Maharashtra

Mantralaya is a seven storeyed building which houses most of the departments of the state government in this building. The Chief Minister sits on the sixth floor. The Chief Secretary, sits on the sixth floor. Due to an increasing number of departments and staff, a new "annexe" building was built. Also, a new administrative building of 19 floors was constructed opposite Mantralaya to accommodate additional departments.

== Fires ==
On 21 June 2012 a fire broke out at the building. As per the preliminary report, the fire was caused due to an electric wire short circuit. Five people died, twenty were injured and hundreds of files were destroyed in the fire.

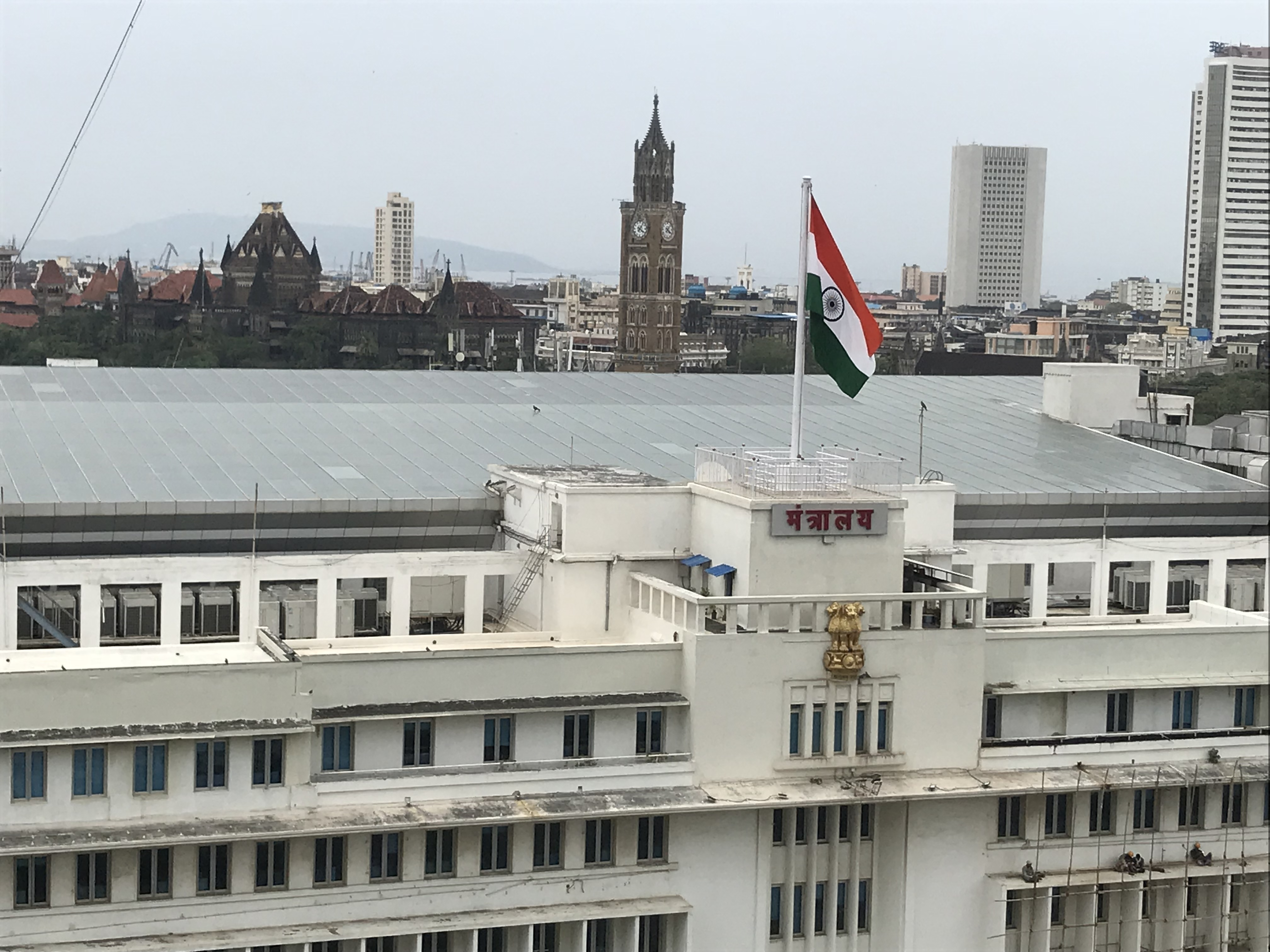
Office of Chief Minister of Maharashtra

On 9 March 2013, at 11:40 am, another large fire broke out on the fourth floor of Mantralaya. As per preliminary reports, the fire was caused by a short circuit, which caused the chemicals being used for its renovation to catch fire.

== 2018 Road Safety Maha Walkathon ==
On 18 November 2018, Chandrakant Patil (Minister for Revenue and Public Works | Maharashtra State) flagged-off the Maha Walkathon from Mantralaya Gate at 8 am to spread awareness on Road Safety, No Honking and Responsible Driving. More than 5 Lakh participants joined Maha Walkathon across the State of Maharashtra.

== See also ==
- Vidhan Bhavan, Nagpur
- Government of Maharashtra
