= Dabhadi =

Dabhadi may refer to:

- Dabhadi, Dahanu, a village in Maharashtra, India
- Dabhadi, Malegaon, a village in Maharashtra, India
