= Ministry of Agriculture (Maharashtra) =

Indian state ministry

Ministry of Agriculture Government of Maharashtra
- मंत्रालय कृषी विभाग महाराष्ट्र शासन
- Seal of the state of Maharashtra

- Building of Administrative Headquarters of Mumbai

Agency overview
- Formed: 1883; 143 years ago
- Jurisdiction: Maharashtra
- Headquarters: Mantralaya, Mumbai
- Annual budget: State budget of Government of Maharashtra
- Minister responsible: Dattatray Vithoba Bharne, Cabinet Minister
- Deputy Ministers responsible: Ashish Jaiswal, Minister of State
- Agency executive: Eknath Davale (IAS), Secretary
- Website: http://krishi.maharashtra.gov.in/1001/Home

The Ministry of Agriculture, a ministry of the Government of Maharashtra, is the apex body for formulation and administration of the rules and regulations and laws related to agriculture in the state of Maharashtra.Adv Manikrao Shivajirao Kokate is the current minister heading this ministry.

== List ==
#	Portrait	Minister	Constituency	Term of office			Chief Minister	Party
1		P. K. Sawant	Chiplun	1 May 1960	7 March 1962	1 year, 310 days	Yashwantrao Chavan	Indian National Congress
2		Balasaheb Desai	Patan	8 March 1962	20 November 1962	1 year, 261 days	Yashwantrao Chavan	Indian National Congress
2		Balasaheb Desai	Patan	20 November 1962	24 November 1963	1 year, 261 days	Marotrao Kannamwar	Indian National Congress
(1)		P. K. Sawant	Chiplun	25 November 1963	5 December 1963	3 years, 96 days	himself	Indian National Congress
(1)		P. K. Sawant	Chiplun	5 December 1963	1 March 1967	3 years, 96 days	Vasantrao Naik	Indian National Congress
3		Gopalrao Khedkar	Akot	1 March 1967	27 October 1969	2 years, 240 days	Vasantrao Naik	Indian National Congress
4		Keshavrao Sonawane	Latur City	27 October 1969	13 March 1972	2 years, 138 days	Vasantrao Naik	Indian National Congress
5		Vasantdada Patil	MLC	13 March 1972	4 April 1973	1 year, 22 days	Vasantrao Naik	Indian National Congress
6		Hari Govindrao Vartak	Vasai	4 April 1973	17 March 1974	347 days	Vasantrao Naik	Indian National Congress
7		Anant Namjoshi	Girgaon	17 March 1974	21 February 1975	341 days	Vasantrao Naik	Indian National Congress
8		Sharad Pawar	Baramati	21 February 1975	16 April 1977	2 years, 54 days	Shankarrao Chavan	Indian National Congress
(6)		Hari Govindrao Vartak	Vasai	16 April 1977	17 May 1977	2 years, 54 days	Shankarrao Chavan	Indian National Congress
9		Purushottam Dakate	Umred	17 May 1977	18 July 1978	1 year, 62 days	Vasantdada Patil	Indian National Congress
10		Arjunrao Kasture		18 July 1978	17 February 1980	1 year, 214 days	Sharad Pawar	Indian Congress (Socialist)
11		Bhagwantrao M. Gaikwad	Kalameshwar	9 June 1980	21 January 1982	2 years, 238 days	A. R. Antulay	Indian National Congress
11		Bhagwantrao M. Gaikwad	Kalameshwar	21 January 1982	2 February 1983	2 years, 238 days	Babasaheb Bhosale	Indian National Congress
12		Nanabhau Yambadwar	MLC	2 February 1983	5 March 1985	2 years, 31 days	Vasantdada Patil	Indian National Congress
13		Narendra Tidke	Savner	12 March 1985	3 June 1985	83 days	Vasantdada Patil	Indian National Congress
14		Vijaysinh Mohite–Patil	Malshiras	3 June 1985	12 March 1986	282 days	Shivajirao Patil Nilangekar	Indian National Congress
(11)		Bhagwantrao M. Gaikwad	Kalameshwar	12 March 1986	26 June 1988	2 years, 106 days	Shankarrao Chavan	Indian National Congress
15		Vilasrao Deshmukh	Latur City	26 June 1988	4 March 1990	1 year, 251 days	Sharad Pawar	Indian National Congress
16		Shivajirao Deshmukh	MLC	4 March 1990	25 June 1991	1 year, 113 days	Sharad Pawar	Indian National Congress
17		Rohidas Patil	Dhule Rural	25 June 1991	6 March 1993	1 year, 254 days	Sudhakarrao Naik	Indian National Congress
18		Harshvardhan Deshmukh	Morshi	6 March 1993	14 March 1995	2 years, 8 days	Sharad Pawar	Independent
19		Shashikant Sutar	Shivajinagar	14 March 1995	1 February 1999	3 years, 324 days	Manohar Joshi	Shiv Sena
20		Radhakrishna Vikhe Patil	Shirdi	1 February 1999	18 October 1999	259 days	Narayan Rane	Shiv Sena
21		Ranjeet Deshmukh	MLC	18 October 1999	18 January 2003	3 years, 92 days	Vilasrao Deshmukh	Indian National Congress
22		Sushilkumar Shinde	Solapur South	18 January 2003	1 November 2004	1 year, 288 days	himself	Indian National Congress
23		Vilasrao Deshmukh	Latur City	1 November 2004	9 November 2004	8 days	himself	Indian National Congress
24		Balasaheb Thorat	Sangamner	9 November 2004	8 December 2008	6 years, 2 days	Vilasrao Deshmukh	Indian National Congress
24		Balasaheb Thorat	Sangamner	8 December 2008	11 November 2010	6 years, 2 days	Ashok Chavan	Indian National Congress
(20)		Radhakrishna Vikhe Patil	Shirdi	11 November 2010	28 September 2014	3 years, 321 days	Prithviraj Chavan	Indian National Congress
25		Eknath Khadse	Muktainagar	31 October 2014	4 June 2016	1 year, 217 days	Devendra Fadnavis	Bharatiya Janata Party
26		Chandrakant Patil	MLC	4 June 2016	8 July 2016	34 days	Devendra Fadnavis	Bharatiya Janata Party
27		Pandurang Fundkar	MLC	8 July 2016	31 May 2018	1 year, 327 days	Devendra Fadnavis	Bharatiya Janata Party
(26)		Chandrakant Patil	MLC	1 June 2018	16 June 2019	1 year, 15 days	Devendra Fadnavis	Bharatiya Janata Party
28		Anil Bonde	Morshi	16 June 2019	12 November 2019	149 days	Devendra Fadnavis	Bharatiya Janata Party
29		Subhash Desai	MLC	28 November 2019	30 December 2019	32 days	Uddhav Thackeray	Shiv Sena
30		Dadaji Bhuse	Malegaon Outer	30 December 2019	27 June 2022	2 years, 179 days	Uddhav Thackeray	Shiv Sena
31		Shankarrao Gadakh	Nevasa	27 June 2022	30 June 2022	3 days	Uddhav Thackeray	Shiv Sena
32		Eknath Shinde	Kopri-Pachpakhadi	30 June 2022	9 August 2022	40 days	himself	Shiv Sena
33		Abdul Sattar	Sillod	9 August 2022	2 July 2023	327 days	Eknath Shinde	Shiv Sena
34		Dhananjay Munde	Parli	2 July 2023	5 December 2024	1 year, 156 days	Eknath Shinde	Nationalist Congress Party
35		Manikrao Kokate	Sinnar	15 December 2024	31 July 2025	228 days	Devendra Fadnavis	Bharatiya Janata Party
36		Dattatray Vithoba Bharne	Indapur	31 July 2025	incumbent	1 year, 59 days	Devendra Fadnavis	Bharatiya Janata Party

== History ==
Department of agriculture was established in 1883 after recommendation of Famine Commission(1881). Varies hybrid varieties of crops were deployed in 1965-66 which laid down the foundation of Green Revolution.

== Structure ==
Agriculture section has three different ministers and divisions.

- Dadaji Bhuse, Minister of Agriculture
- Sandipanrao Bhumre, Minister of Horticulture
- Shankarrao Gadakh, Minister of Soil and Water Conservation

== International Partnerships ==
Ministry signed an MoU with United States Department of Agriculture in June 2021 for better collaboration between United States of America and Government of Maharashtra.
