= Dadaji Bhuse =

Indian politician

Cabinet Minister Government of Maharashtra
- Incumbent
- Assumed office 15 December 2024
- Minister: School Education
- Governor: C. P. Radhakrishnan; Acharya Devvrat additional charge
- Cabinet: Third Fadnavis ministry
- Chief Minister: Devendra Fadnavis
- Deputy CM: Eknath Shinde; Ajit Pawar (till his demise in 2026) Sunetra Pawar (from 2026)
- Guardian Minister: NA
- Preceded by: Deepak Vasant Kesarkar

Cabinet Minister Government of Maharashtra
- In office 14 August 2022 – 26 November 2024
- Minister: Public Works (Including Public Undertakings) (14 July 2023 - 26 November 2024); Employment Guarantee (16 August 2024 - 26 November 2024); Horticulture (16 August 2024 - 26 November 2024); Ports Development (14 July 2023 - 14 August 2022); Mining Department (14 July 2023 - 14 August 2022)
- Governor: Bhagat Singh Koshyari; Ramesh Bais; C. P. Radhakrishnan
- Chief minister: Eknath Shinde
- Deputy CM: Devendra Fadnavis; Ajit Pawar
- Guardian minister: Nashik District
- Preceded by: Aslam Shaikh (Ports Development Ministry); Subhash Desai (Mining Department Ministry); Chhagan Bhujbal (Nashik District)

Cabinet Minister Government of Maharashtra
- In office 30 December 2019 – 27 June 2022
- Minister: Agriculture; Ex. Servicemen Welfare
- Governor: Bhagat Singh Koshyari
- Chief minister: Uddhav Thackeray
- Deputy CM: Ajit Pawar
- Guardian minister: Palghar District
- Preceded by: Anil Bonde (Agriculture Ministry); Sambhaji Patil Nilangekar (Ex. Servicemen Welfare Ministry); Vishnu Sawra (Palghar District)
- Succeeded by: Shankarrao Gadakh; Additional charge (Agriculture Ministry): Shankarrao Gadakh; Additional charge (Ex. Servicemen Welfare Ministry): Aditi Sunil Tatkare; Additional charge (Palghar District)

Minister of State Government of Maharashtra
- In office 7 June 2016 – 8 November 2019
- Minister: Rural Development Ministry
- Governor: C. Vidyasagar Rao; Bhagat Singh Koshyari
- Chief minister: Devendra Fadnavis
- Guardian minister: NA
- Succeeded by: Abdul Sattar Abdul Nabi
- In office 5 December 2014 – 7 June 2016
- Minister: Co-operation Ministry
- Governor: C. Vidyasagar Rao
- Chief minister: Devendra Fadnavis
- Guardian Minister: NA

Member of Legislative Assembly of Maharashtra
- Incumbent
- Assumed office 2009-Present
- Constituency: Malegaon Outer
- In office 2004–2009
- Preceded by: Prashant Vyankatrao Hiray
- Constituency: Dabhadi

Personal details
- Born: 6 March 1964 (age 62) At.Soygaon Tq.Malegaon, Nashik district
- Party: Shiv Sena (2022-present)
- Spouse: Anita Bhuse
- Children: Ajinkya Bhuse, Avishkar Bhuse
- Occupation: Politician

Dadaji Dagduji Bhuse is a member of the 16th Maharashtra Legislative Assembly, representing the Malegaon Outer Assembly Constituency. He belongs to the Shiv Sena (Shinde faction). This marks his fifth consecutive term as a member of the Legislative Assembly. In the 2024 state elections held on November 20, 2024, He defeated Advay Hirey of Shiv Sena (UBT) led by Uddhav Thackeray, retaining his seat with a significant margin.

In December 2014, he was appointed the minister of state for co-operation, and over the years, he has held several significant positions. As of December 2024, He serves as the cabinet minister for agriculture in Maharashtra under the government led by Chief Minister Eknath Shinde. His portfolio includes initiatives aimed at modernizing the agricultural sector, supporting farmer welfare, and implementing water resource management projects.

He has also been instrumental in various state infrastructure projects, including enhancing connectivity through highways and addressing drought-related challenges through water storage improvements.

== Early life and education ==
Dadaji Bhuse was born on March 6, 1965, in Malegaon, Maharashtra, to a farming family. His father, Dagadu Bayaji Bhuse, was a freedom fighter, instilling a strong sense of service in him. He completed his early education locally and earned a diploma in engineering. He initially worked with the Irrigation Department but left to pursue social work and a political career, inspired by Dharmaveer Anand Dighe.

== Political career ==
Dadaji Bhuse’s political journey began in 2004 when he contested and won the Maharashtra Legislative Assembly elections as an independent candidate, defeating an incumbent minister. He has consistently represented the Malegaon Outer constituency since then, winning in 2004, 2009, 2014, 2019, and most recently in 2024. Currently, he serves as the cabinet minister for public works (including public undertakings).

== Personal life ==
He is married to Anita Bhuse, who is also involved in farming. His net worth is approximately ₹10.97 crore, with no reported liabilities.

== Key achievements and initiatives ==
- Agriculture sector reforms: As minister of agriculture, Bhuse spearheaded initiatives such as approving five agricultural colleges simultaneously, a first in Maharashtra’s history. He has also promoted modern farming practices and welfare schemes for farmers.
- Infrastructure development: Dadaji Bhuse played a crucial role in the Samruddhi Mahamarg project, overseeing the development of the highway section between Bharveer and Igatpuri. He emphasized its role in boosting connectivity and economic development .
- Water resource management: Dadaji Bhuse has overseen projects like doubling the capacity of Talwade Lake to mitigate drought and enhancing water storage in the region.
- Social contributions: He founded the Janata Raja Mitra Mandal, an organization aimed at addressing social issues and supporting youth development.

== Positions held ==
- 2004: Elected to Maharashtra Legislative Assembly (1st term)
- 2009: Re-elected to Maharashtra Legislative Assembly (2nd term)
- 2014: Re-elected to Maharashtra Legislative Assembly (3rd term)
- 2014 - 2016: Minister of state for co-operation in Maharashtra State Government
- 2014 - 2019: Guardian minister of Dhule District
- 2016 - 2019: Minister of state for rural development in Maharashtra State Government.
- 2019: Re-elected to Maharashtra Legislative Assembly (4th term)
- 2019: Appointed minister of agriculture, Ex Soldiers Welfare
- 2020: Appointed guardian minister of Palghar district
- 2022 : Pwd Rural Development Cabinet Minister
- 2024: Re-Elected to Maharashtra Legislative Assembly (5th term)
- 2024: Ministry of Agriculture (Maharashtra)

== See also ==
- Uddhav Thackeray ministry
- Devendra Fadnavis ministry

Political offices
Preceded by Deepak Kesarkar	Minister of State for Rural Development, Maharashtra State; July 2016–present	Incumbent
Preceded by	Minister of state for co-operation, Maharashtra State; December 2014–July 2016	Succeeded by Gulab Raghunath Patil
Preceded by	Maharashtra State guardian minister for Dhule district December 2014–present	Incumbent
