= Ministry of Employment Guarantee (Maharashtra) =

Maharashtra government ministry responsible for Employment Guarantee

Ministry of Employment Guarantee Government of Maharashtra
- मंत्रालय रोजगार गारंटी विभाग, महाराष्ट्र शासन
- Seal of the state of Maharashtra

- Building of Administrative Headquarters of Mumbai

Ministry overview
- Jurisdiction: (India) Maharashtra
- Headquarters: Mantralay, Mumbai
- Minister responsible: Bharatshet Gogawale, Cabinet Minister
- Deputy Minister responsible: Vacant, TBD since 29 June 2022, Minister of State
- Ministry executive: (IAS)
- Parent department: Government of Maharashtra

The Ministry of Employment Guarantee is a Ministry of the Government of Maharashtra state.

The Ministry is headed by a cabinet level Minister. Bharatshet Gogawale is Current Minister of Employment Guarantee Government of Maharashtra.

== Head office ==
Minister of Employment Guarantee मंत्री रोजगार गारंटी विभाग
- Emblem of India

- Flag of India

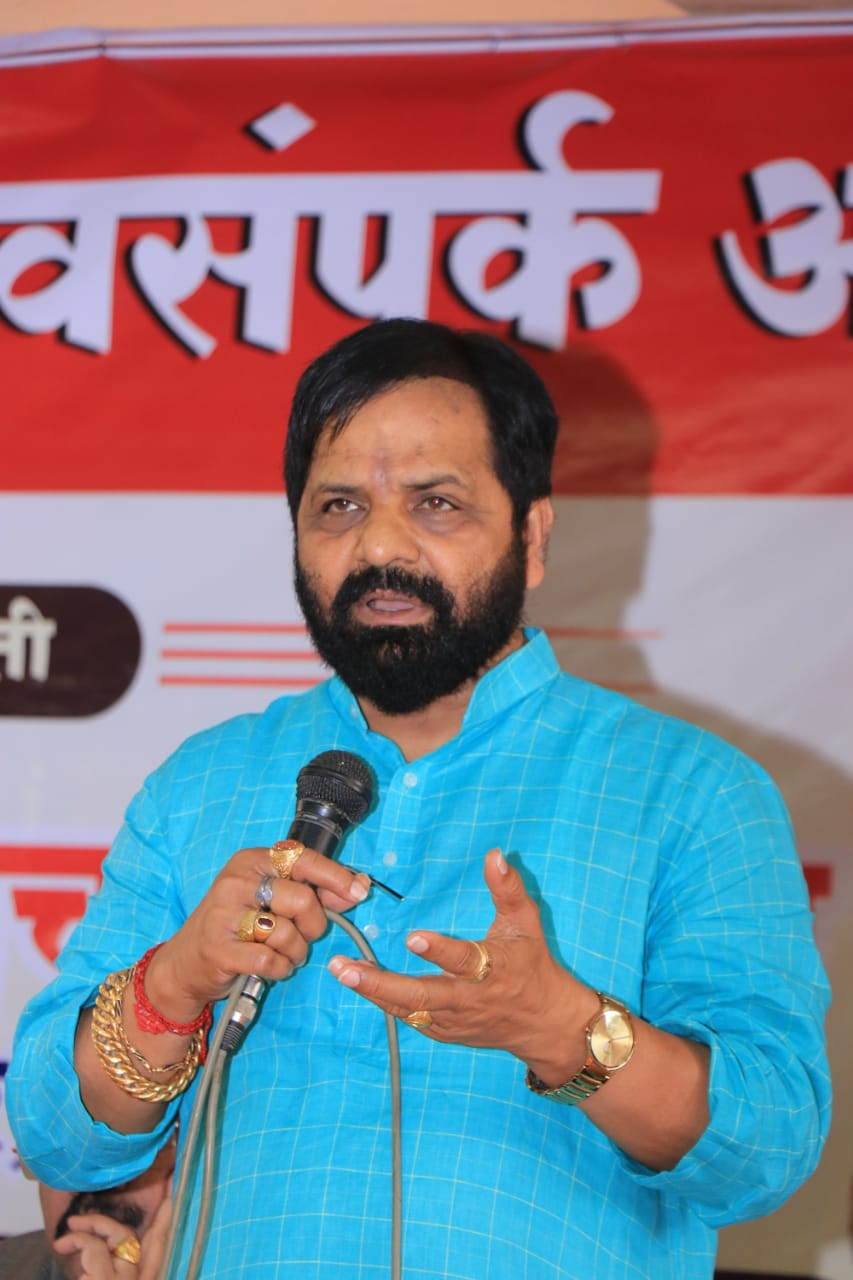
- Incumbent; Bharatshet Gogawale since 21 December 2024
- Ministry of Employment Guarantee (Maharashtra)
- Style: The Honourable
- Abbreviation: Cabinet Minister
- Member of: State Cabinet
- Reports to: Chief Minister, Maharashtra Legislature
- Seat: Mantralaya, Mumbai
- Appointer: Governor on the advice of the Chief Minister
- Term length: 5 years
- Precursor: Devendra Fadnavis; (2024- 2024)
- Inaugural holder: Keshavrao Sonawane; (1960-1962)
- Formation: 1 May 1960
- Deputy: Vacant, TBD; since 29 June 2022

== Cabinet Ministers ==
No.	Portrait	Minister (Constituency)	Term of office			Political party	Ministry	Chief Minister
No.	Portrait	Minister (Constituency)	From	To	Period	Political party	Ministry	Chief Minister
Minister of Employment Guarantee
01		B. G. Gadhe (MLA for Jalna North Constituency No. 101- Jalna District) (Legislative Assembly)	01 May 1960	07 March 1962	1 year, 310 days	Indian National Congress	Yashwantrao I	Yashwantrao Chavan
02		Keshavrao Sonawane (MLA for Latur Constituency No. 235- Latur District) (Legislative Assembly)	08 March 1962	19 November 1962	256 days	Indian National Congress	Yashwantrao II	Yashwantrao Chavan
03		Sheshrao Krishnarao Wankhede (MLA for Sawargoan Constituency No. 49- Nagpur District) (Legislative Assembly)	20 November 1962	24 November 1963	1 year, 4 days	Indian National Congress	Kannamwar l	Marotrao Kannamwar
04		Parashuram Krishnaji Sawant (MLA for Chiplun Constituency No. 265- Ratnagiri District) (Legislative Assembly) (Interim Chief Minister)	25 November 1962	04 December 1963	9 days	Indian National Congress	Sawant	Parashuram Krishnaji Sawant
05		Nirmala Raje Bhosale (MLA for Satara Constituency No. 268- Satara District) (Legislative Assembly)	05 December 1963	01 March 1967	3 years, 86 days	Indian National Congress	Vasantrao I	Vasantrao Naik
06		Shankarrao Chavan (MLA for Bhokar Constituency No. 85- Nanded District) (Legislative Assembly)	01 March 1967	27 October 1969	2 years, 240 days	Indian National Congress	Vasantrao II	Vasantrao Naik
07		Madhukar Dhanaji Chaudhari (MLA for Raver Constituency No. 11- Jalgaon District) (Legislative Assembly)	27 October 1969	13 March 1972	2 years, 138 days	Indian National Congress	Vasantrao II	Vasantrao Naik
08		Yashwantrao Mohite (MLA for Karad South Constituency No. 260- Satara District) (Legislative Assembly)	13 March 1972	04 April 1973	1 year, 32 days	Indian National Congress	Vasantrao III	Vasantrao Naik
09		Vasantrao Naik (MLA for Pusad Constituency No. 81- Yavatmal District) (Legislative Assembly) (Chief Minister)	04 April 1973	17 Match; 1974	347 days	Indian National Congress	Vasantrao III	Vasantrao Naik
10		Abdul Rahman Antulay (MLA for Shrivardhan Constituency No. 193- Raigad District) (Legislative Assembly)	17 Match; 1974	21 February 1975	341 days	Indian National Congress	Vasantrao III	Vasantrao Naik
11		Prabha Rau (MLA for Pulgaon Constituency No. 41- Wardha District) (Legislative Assembly)	21 February 1975	16 April 1977	2 years, 54 days	Indian National Congress	Shankarrao I	Shankarrao Chavan
12		Vasantdada Patil (MLC for Elected by MLAs Constituency No. 20 - Sangli District) (Legislative Council) (Chief Minister)	17 April 1977	07 March 1978	1 year, 324 days	Indian National Congress	Vasantdada I	Vasantdada Patil
13		Purushottam Dekate (MLA for Umred Constituency No. 51- Nagpur District (Legislative Assembly)	07 March 1978	18 July 1978	133 days	Indian National Congress (Indira)	Vasantdada II	Vasantdada Patil
14		Chhedilal Gupta (MLA for Gondiya Constituency No. 134- Gondiya District) (Legislative Assembly)	18 July 1978	18 February 1980	1 year, 215 days	Janata Party	Pawar I	Sharad Pawar
15		Shivajirao Patil Nilangekar (MLA for Nilanga Constituency No. 238- Latur District) (Legislative Assembly)	09 June 1980	21 January 1982	1 year, 226 days	Indian National Congress	Antulay	Abdul Rahman Antulay
16		V. Subramaniam (MLA for South Mumbai Constituency No. 121- Mumbai City District) (Legislative Assembly)	21 January 1982	02 February 1983	1 year, 12 days	Indian National Congress	Bhosale	Babasaheb Bhosale
17		Vasantdada Patil (MLA for Sangli Constituency No. 282- Sangli District) (Legislative Assembly) (Chief Minister)	07 February 1983	05 March 1985	2 years, 26 days	Indian National Congress	Vasantdada III	Vasantdada Patil
18		Balachandra Bhai Sawant (MLC for Elected by MLAs Constituency No. 09 - Ratnagiri District) (Legislative Council)	12 March 1985	03 June 1985	83 days	Indian National Congress	Vasantdada IV	Vasantdada Patil
19		Balachandra Bhai Sawant (MLC for Elected by MLAs Constituency No. 09 - Ratnagiri District) (Legislative Council)	03 June 1985	12 March 1986	282 days	Indian National Congress	Nilangekar	Shivajirao Patil Nilangekar
20		Balachandra Bhai Sawant (MLC for Elected by MLAs Constituency No. 09 - Ratnagiri District) (Legislative Council)	12 March 1986	26 June 1988	2 years, 106 days	Indian National Congress	Shankarrao II	Shankarrao Chavan
21		Sushilkumar Shinde (MLA for Solapur City Central Constituency No. 249- Solapur District) (Legislative Assembly)	26 June 1988	03 March 1990	1 year, 250 days	Indian National Congress	Pawar II	Sharad Pawar
22		Ramdas Athawale (MLC for Elected by MLAs Constituency No. 11 - Sangli District) (Legislative Council)	03 March 1990	25 June 1991	1 year, 114 days	Republican Party of India (Athawale)	Pawar III	Sharad Pawar
23		Ramdas Athawale (MLC for Elected by MLAs Constituency No. 11 - Sangli District) (Legislative Council)	25 June 1991	22 February 1993	1 year, 242 days	Republican Party of India (Athawale)	Sudhakarrao	Sudhakarrao Naik
24		Ranjeet Deshmukh (MLA for Savner Constituency No. 49- Nagpur District) (Legislative Assembly)	06 March 1993	18 November 1994	1 year, 257 days	Indian National Congress	Pawar IV	Sharad Pawar
25		Haribhau Bagade (MLA for Aurangabad East Constituency No. 109- Chhatrapati Sambhaji Nagar District Also Previously Known Aurangabad District (Legislative Assembly)	14 March 1995	01 February 1999	3 years, 324 days	Bharatiya Janata Party	Joshi	Manohar Joshi
26		Haribhau Bagade (MLA for Aurangabad East Constituency No. 109- Chhatrapati Sambhaji Nagar District Also Previously Known Aurangabad District (Legislative Assembly)	01 February 1999	11 May 1999	99 days	Bharatiya Janata Party	Rane	Narayan Rane
27		Radhakrishna Vikhe Patil (MLA for Shirdi Constituency No. 218- Ahmednagar District) (Legislative Assembly)	11 May 1999	17 October 1999	159 days	Shiv Sena	Rane	Narayan Rane
28		Ganpatrao Deshmukh (MLA for Sangola Constituency No. 235- Solapur District (Legislative Assembly)	19 October 1999	09 September 2001	1 year, 325 days	Peasants and Workers Party of India	Deshmukh I	Vilasrao Deshmukh
29		Shivajirao Moghe (MLA for Arni Constituency No. 80- Yavatmal District) (Legislative Assembly)	09 September 2001	16 January 2003	1 year, 129 days	Indian National Congress	Deshmukh I	Vilasrao Deshmukh
30		Shivajirao Moghe (MLA for Arni Constituency No. 80- Yavatmal District) (Legislative Assembly)	18 January 2003	01 November 2004	1 year, 295 days	Nationalist Congress Party	Sushilkumar	Sushilkumar Shinde
31		Vilasrao Deshmukh (MLA for Latur City Constituency No. 235- Latur District) (Legislative Assembly) (Chief Minister)	01 November 2004	09 November 2004	8 days	Indian National Congress	Deshmukh II	Vilasrao Deshmukh
32		Harshvardhan Patil (MLA for Indapur Constituency No. 200- Pune District (Legislative Assembly)	09 November 2004	01 December 2008	4 years, 22 days	Independent politician Supported Party (Indian National Congress)	Deshmukh II	Vilasrao Deshmukh
33		Vinay Kore (MLA for Shahuwadi Constituency No. 277- Kolhapur District) (Legislative Assembly)	08 December 2008	06 November 2009	333 days	Jan Surajya Shakti	Ashok I	Ashok Chavan
34		Rajendra Darda (MLA for Aurangabad East Constituency No. 109- Chhatrapati Sambhaji Nagar District Also Previously Known Aurangabad District (Legislative Assembly)	07 November 2009	10 November 2010	1 year, 3 days	Indian National Congress	Ashok II	Ashok Chavan
35		Vijaykumar Krishnarao Gavit (MLA for Nandurbar Constituency No. 03- Nandurbar District) (Legislative Assembly)	11 November 2010	19 March 2014	3 years, 128 days	Nationalist Congress Party	Prithviraj	Prithviraj Chavan
36		Prithviraj Chavan (MLC for Elected by MLAs Constituency No. 19 - Satara District) (Legislative Council) (Chief Minister); Additional Charge	19 March 2014	29 May 2014	71 days	Indian National Congress	Prithviraj	Prithviraj Chavan
37		Jitendra Awhad (MLC for Elected by MLAs Constituency No. 15 - Thane District) (Legislative Council)	29 May 2014	26 September 2014	120 days	Nationalist Congress Party	Prithviraj	Prithviraj Chavan
38		Pankaja Munde (MLA for Parli Constituency No. 233- Beed District) (Legislative Assembly)	31 October 2014	08 July 2016	1 year, 251 days	Bharatiya Janata Party	Fadnavis I	Devendra Fadnavis
39		Jayakumar Jitendrasinh Rawal (MLA for Sindkheda Constituency No. 06- Dhule District) (Legislative Assembly)	08 July 2016	16 June 2019	2 years, 343 days	Bharatiya Janata Party	Fadnavis I	Devendra Fadnavis
40		Jaydattaji Kshirsagar (MLA for Beed Constituency No. 230- Beed District) (Legislative Assembly)	16 June 2019	12 November 2019	149 days	Shiv Sena	Fadnavis I	Devendra Fadnavis
41		Devendra Fadnavis (MLA for Nagpur South West Constituency No. 52- Nagpur District) (Legislative Assembly) (Chief_Minister); In Charge	23 November 2019	28 November 2019	5 days	Bharatiya Janata Party	Fadnavis II	Devendra Fadnavis
42		Subhash Desai (MLC for Elected by MLAs Constituency No. 09 - Mumbai Suburban District) (Legislative Council)	28 November 2019	30 December 2019	32 days	Shiv Sena	Thackeray	Uddhav Thackeray
43		Sandipanrao Bhumre (MLA for Paithan Constituency No. 110- Chhatrapati Sambhaji Nagar District Also Previously Known Aurangabad District (Legislative Assembly)	30 December 2019	27 June 2022	2 years, 179 days	Shiv Sena	Thackeray	Uddhav Thackeray
44		Shankarrao Gadakh (MLA for Nevasa Constituency No. 221- Ahmednagar District) (Legislative Assembly); Additional Charge	27 June 2022	29 June 2022	2 days	Shiv Sena	Thackeray	Uddhav Thackeray
45		Eknath Shinde (MLA for Kopri-Pachpakhadi Constituency No. 147- Thane District) (Legislative Assembly) (Chief Minister); In Charge	30 June 2022	14 August 2022	45 days	Shiv Sena (Shinde Group)	Eknath	Eknath Shinde
46		Sandipanrao Bhumre (MLA for Paithan Constituency No. 110- Chhatrapati Sambhaji Nagar District Also Previously Known Aurangabad District (Legislative Assembly)	14 August 2022	04 June 2024	1 year, 326 days	Shiv Sena (Shinde Group)	Eknath	Eknath Shinde
47		Eknath Shinde (MLA for Kopri-Pachpakhadi Constituency No. 147- Thane District) (Legislative Assembly) (Chief Minister); Additional Charge	04 June 2024	16 August 2024	73 days	Shiv Sena (2022–present)	Eknath	Eknath Shinde
48		Dadaji Bhuse (MLA for Malegaon Outer Constituency No. 81- Nashik District) (Legislative Assembly)	16 August 2024	26 November 2024	102 days	Shiv Sena (2022–present)	Eknath	Eknath Shinde
49		Devendra Fadnavis (MLA for Nagpur South West Constituency No. 52- Nagpur District) (Legislative Assembly) (Chief_Minister); In Charge	05 December 2024	21 December 2024	16 days	Bharatiya Janata Party	Fadnavis III	Devendra Fadnavis
50		Bharatshet Gogawale (MLA for Mahad Constituency No. 194- Raigad District) (Legislative Assembly)	21 December 2024	Incumbent	1 year, 281 days	Shiv Sena (2022–present)	Fadnavis III	Devendra Fadnavis

== Ministers of State ==
No.	Portrait	Deputy Minister (Constituency)	Term of office			Political party	Ministry	Minister	Chief Minister
No.	Portrait	Deputy Minister (Constituency)	From	To	Period	Political party	Ministry	Minister	Chief Minister
Deputy Minister of Employment Guarantee
The Post of Deputy Minister / Minister of States has been kept Vacant from 23 November 2019 To 28 November 2019			23 November 2019	28 November 2019	5 days	NA	Fadnavis II	Devendra Fadnavis	Devendra Fadnavis
01		Sanjay Bansode (MLA for Udgir Constituency No. 237- Latur District) (Legislative Assembly)	30 December 2019	29 June 2022	2 years, 181 days	Nationalist Congress Party	Thackeray	Sandipanrao Bhumre (2019 - 2022); Shankarrao Gadakh (2022 - 2022)	Uddhav Thackeray
The Post of Deputy Minister / Minister of States has been kept Vacant from 30 June 2022			30 June 2022	26 November 2024	2 years, 149 days	NA	Eknath	Eknath Shinde (2022 - 2022); Sandipanrao Bhumre (2022 - 2024); Eknath Shinde Additional Charge (2024 - 2024); Dadaji Bhuse (2024 – 2024)	Eknath Shinde
Vacant			21 December 2024	incumbent	1 year, 281 days	NA	Fadnavis III	Bharatshet Gogawale (2024 – Present)	Devendra Fadnavis
