= Thackeray ministry =

Maharashtra state government (2019–2022)

- 30th Cabinet of the State of Maharashtra

- Uddhav Thackeray; Chief Minister of Maharashtra
- Date formed: 28 November 2019
- Date dissolved: 29 June 2022

People and organisations
- Head of state: Bhagat Singh Koshyari
- Head of government: Uddhav Thackeray (SHS)
- Deputy head of government: Ajit Pawar (NCP)
- Ministers removed: 2
- Total no. of members: 41
- Member parties: SHS; NCP; INC
- Status in legislature: Coalition
- Opposition party: BJP
- Opposition leader: Devendra Fadnavis (Assembly); Pravin Darekar (Council)

History
- Election: 2019
- Legislature terms: 2 years, 214 days
- Predecessor: Second Devendra Fadnavis ministry
- Successor: Eknath Shinde ministry

After the 2019 Maharashtra Legislative Assembly elections, post-poll alliance was formed in between Shiv Sena, Nationalist Congress Party and Indian National Congress to form Maha Vikas Aghadi (MVA). Uddhav Thackeray, the president of Shiv Sena was sworn in as the 19th Chief Minister of Maharashtra on 28 November 2019. Following is the list of ministers from the cabinet of Uddhav Thackeray starting from November 2019.

== Government formation ==
The Thackeray ministry proved its majority in the Legislative Assembly on November 30, 2019.

Motion of confidence Uddhav Thackeray (Shiv Sena)
Ballot →	30 November 2019
Required majority →	Simple majority
Yes: • Shiv Sena (56); • NCP (54); • Congress (44)	154 / 288
No: • None	0 / 288
Abstentions: • AIMIM (2); • MNS (1); • CPI (M) (1)	4 / 288
Absentees: • BJP (106); • JSS (1); • KSP (1); • RSP (1); • Independents (10)	119 / 288
Sources
Pro Tem Speaker: • Dilip Walse-Patil (NCP) (1)	1 / 288

== Council Ministers ==
=== Cabinet Ministers ===
Portfolio	Portrait	Minister	Party	Term
Chief Minister: General Administration; Law and Judiciary; Information and Public Relations; Information Technology; Forests Department		Uddhav Thackeray	Shiv Sena	28 November 2019 - 29 June 2022
Deputy Chief Minister: Cabinet Minister for Finance; Cabinet Minister for Planning; Cabinet Minister for State Excise		Ajit Pawar	Nationalist Congress Party	30 December 2019 - 29 June 2022
Cabinet Minister for Home Affairs		Dilip Walse-Patil	Nationalist Congress Party	30 December 2019 - 29 June 2022
Cabinet Minister for Revenue		Balasaheb Thorat	Indian National Congress	28 November 2019 - 29 June 2022
Cabinet Minister of Water Resources; Cabinet Minister for Command Area Development.		Jayant Patil	Nationalist Congress Party	28 November 2019 - 29 June 2022
Cabinet Minister for Social Justice; Cabinet Minister for Special Assistance		Dhananjay Munde	Nationalist Congress Party	30 December 2019 - 29 June 2022
Cabinet Minister for Food & Civil Supply; Cabinet Minister for Consumer Affairs; Cabinet Minister for State Border Defence (First)		Chhagan Bhujbal	Nationalist Congress Party	28 November 2019 - 29 June 2022
Cabinet Minister for Environment and Climate Change; Cabinet Minister for Tourism; Cabinet Minister for Protocol		Aaditya Thackeray	Shiv Sena	30 December 2019 - 29 June 2022
Cabinet Minister for Minority Development and Aukaf		Nawab Malik	Nationalist Congress Party	30 December 2019 - 27 March 2022
Cabinet Minister for Public Works (Excluding Public Undertakings)		Ashok Chavan	Indian National Congress	30 December 2019 - 29 June 2022
Cabinet Minister for Food and Drug Administration		Rajendra Shingne	Nationalist Congress Party	30 December 2019 - 29 June 2022
Cabinet Minister for Public Health and Family Welfare		Rajesh Tope	Nationalist Congress Party	30 December 2019 - 29 June 2022
Cabinet Minister for Energy		Nitin Raut	Indian National Congress	30 December 2019 - 29 June 2022
Cabinet Minister for School Education		Varsha Gaikwad	Indian National Congress	30 December 2019 - 29 June 2022
Cabinet Minister for Housing		Jitendra Awhad	Nationalist Congress Party	30 December 2019 - 29 June 2022
Cabinet Minister for Urban Development; Cabinet Minister for Public Works (Including Public Undertakings); State Border Defence (Second)		Eknath Shinde	Shiv Sena	28 November 2019 - 29 June 2022
Cabinet Minister for Animal Husbandry; Cabinet Minister for Dairy Development; Cabinet Minister for Sports and Youth Welfare		Sunil Chhatrapal Kedar	Indian National Congress	30 December 2019 - 29 June 2022
Cabinet Minister Disaster Management; Cabinet Minister for Relief & Rehabilitation; Cabinet Minister for Other Backward Classes; Cabinet Minister for Other Backward Bahujan Welfare; Cabinet Minister for Socially and Educationally Backward Classes; Cabinet Minister for Vimukta Jati; Cabinet Minister for Nomadic Tribes; Cabinet Minister for Special Backward Classes Welfare; Cabinet Minister for Khar Land Development; Cabinet Minister for Earthquake Rehabilitation; Cabinet Minister for Majority Welfare Development		Vijay Namdevrao Wadettiwar	Indian National Congress	30 December 2019 - 29 June 2022
Cabinet Minister for Medical Education; Cabinet Minister for Cultural Affairs		Amit Deshmukh	Indian National Congress	30 December 2019 - 29 June 2022
Ministry of Higher and Technical Education		Uday Samant	Shiv Sena	30 December 2019 - 29 June 2022
Cabinet Minister for Agriculture; Cabinet Minister for Ex. Servicemen Welfare		Dadaji Bhuse	Shiv Sena	30 December 2019 - 29 June 2022
Cabinet Minister for Water Supply; Cabinet Minister for Sanitation		Gulabrao Patil	Shiv Sena	30 December 2019 - 29 June 2022
Cabinet Minister for Tribal Development		K.C.Padvi	Indian National Congress	30 December 2019 - 29 June 2022
Cabinet Minister for Employment Guarantee; Horticulture		Sandipanrao Bhumre	Shiv Sena	30 December 2019 - 29 June 2022
Co-operation; Marketing		Shamrao Pandurang Patil	Nationalist Congress Party	30 December 2019 - 29 June 2022
Transport.; Parliamentary Affairs		Anil Parab	Shiv Sena	30 December 2019 - 29 June 2022
Textiles; Fisheries Department; Ports Development		Aslam Shaikh	Indian National Congress	30 December 2019 - 29 June 2022
Women and Child Development.		Yashomati Chandrakant Thakur	Indian National Congress	30 December 2019 - 29 June 2022
Cabinet Minister for Soil and Water Conservation		Shankarrao Gadakh	Shiv Sena	30 December 2019 - 29 June 2022
Cabinet Minister for Industries.; Cabinet Minister for Mining; Cabinet Minister for Marathi Language		Subhash Desai	Shiv Sena	28 November 2019 - 29 June 2022

=== Ministers of State ===
Portfolio	Minister	Term start	Term end	Party
Revenue.; Rural Development; Ports Development; Khar Land Development; Special Assistance	Abdul Sattar	30 December 2019	29 June 2022	SS
Law and Judiciary.; Industries.; Mining Department.; Tourism.; Horticulture; Sports and Youth Welfare; Protocol; Information and Public Relations.	Aditi Tatkare	30 December 2019	29 June 2022	NCP
Home Affairs (Urban); Housing.; Transport.; Information Technology.; Parliamentary Affairs.; Ex. Servicemen Welfare	Satej Patil	30 December 2019	29 June 2022	INC
Home Affairs (Rural); Finance; Planning.; State Excise; Skill Development And Entrepreneurship.; Marketing	Shambhuraj Desai	30 December 2019	29 June 2022	SS
Public Works (Excluding Public Undertakings); Soil and Water Conservation; Forests Department.; Animal Husbandry; Dairy Development; Fisheries Department; General Administration	Dattatray Vithoba Bharne	30 December 2019	29 June 2022	NCP
Co-operation; Agriculture.; Social Justice; Food & Civil Supply and Consumer Affairs; Minority Development and Aukaf; Marathi Language.	Vishwajeet Kadam	30 December 2019	29 June 2022	INC
Water Resources.; Command Area Development.; School Education; Woman and Child Development.; Other Backward Classes; Other Backward Bahujan Welfare; Socially and Educationally Backward Classes; Vimukta Jati; Nomadic Tribes; Special Backward Classes Welfare; Majority Welfare Development; Labour	Omprakash Kadu	30 December 2019	29 June 2022	PHJSP
Environment and climate change.; Water Supply.; Sanitation; Public Works (Including Public Undertakings); Employment Guarantee; Earthquake Rehabilitation; Parliamentary Affairs.	Sanjay Bansode	30 December 2019	29 June 2022	NCP
Public Health and Family Welfare; Medical Education.; Food and Drug Administration; Textiles; Cultural Affairs	Rajendra Yadravkar	30 December 2019	29 June 2022	SS
Urban Development.; Energy.; Tribal Development; Higher and Technical Education; Disaster Management; Relief & Rehabilitation	Prajakt Tanpure	30 December 2019	29 June 2022	NCP

== By Departments ==
An alphabetical list of all the departments of Maharashtra Government with terms : Cabinet Ministers

Portfolio	Minister	Took office	Left office	Party
General Administration	Uddhav_Thackeray (Acting); Chief Minister	28 November 2019	30 December 2019	SS
General Administration	Uddhav Thackeray; Chief Minister	30 December 2019	29 June 2022	SS
Law and Judiciary	Uddhav Thackeray (Acting); Chief Minister	28 November 2019	30 December 2019	SS
Law and Judiciary	Uddhav Thackeray; Chief Minister	30 December 2019	29 June 2022	SS
Information and Public Relations	Uddhav Thackeray (Acting); Chief Minister	28 November 2019	30 December 2019	SS
Information and Public Relations	Uddhav Thackeray; Chief Minister	30 December 2019	29 June 2022	SS
Information Technology	Uddhav Thackeray (Acting); Chief Minister	28 November 2019	30 December 2019	SS
Information Technology	Uddhav Thackeray; Chief Minister	30 December 2019	29 June 2022	SS
Forests Department	Balasaheb Thorat (Acting)	28 November 2019	30 December 2019	INC
Forests Department	Sanjay Rathod	30 December 2019	28 February 2021	SS
Forests Department	Uddhav Thackeray Additional Charge; Chief Minister	28 February 2021	29 June 2022	SS
Home Affairs	Eknath Shinde (Acting)	28 November 2019	30 December 2019	SS
Home Affairs	Anil Deshmukh	30 December 2019	5 April 2021	NCP
Home Affairs	Dilip Walse-Patil	5 April 2021	29 June 2022	NCP
State Border Defence	Uddhav Thackeray (Acting); Chief Minister	28 November 2019	22 March 2020	SS
State Border Defence	Chhagan Bhujbal (First)	22 March 2020	29 June 2022	NCP
State Border Defence	Eknath Shinde (Second)	22 March 2020	27 June 2022	SS
State Border Defence	Subhash Desai (Second); Additional charge	27 June 2022	29 June 2022	SS
Finance	Jayant Patil (Acting)	28 November 2019	30 December 2019	NCP
Finance	Ajit Pawar; Deputy Chief Minister	30 December 2019	29 June 2022	NCP
Planning	Jayant Patil (Acting)	28 November 2019	30 December 2019	NCP
Planning	Ajit Pawar; Deputy Chief Minister	30 December 2019	29 June 2022	NCP
State Excise	Chhagan Bhujbal (Acting)	28 November 2019	30 December 2019	NCP
State Excise	Dilip Walse-Patil	30 December 2019	5 April 2021	NCP
State Excise	Ajit Pawar (Acting); Deputy Chief Minister	5 April 2021	29 June 2022	NCP
Water Resources	Chhagan Bhujbal (Acting)	28 November 2019	30 December 2019	NCP
Water Resources	Jayant Patil	30 December 2019	29 June 2022	NCP
Command Area Development	Chhagan Bhujbal (Acting)	28 November 2019	30 December 2019	NCP
Command Area Development	Jayant Patil	30 December 2019	29 June 2022	NCP
Public Works (Excluding Public Undertakings)	Nitin Raut (Acting)	28 November 2019	30 December 2019	INC
Public Works (Excluding Public Undertakings)	Ashok Chavan	30 December 2019	29 June 2022	INC
Public Works (Including Public Undertakings)	Eknath Shinde (Acting)	28 November 2019	30 December 2019	SS
Public Works (Including Public Undertakings)	Eknath Shinde	30 December 2019	27 June 2022	SS
Public Works (Including Public Undertakings)	Subhash Desai; Additional_charge	27 June 2022	29 June 2022	SS
Urban Development	Eknath Shinde (Acting)	28 November 2019	30 December 2019	SS
Urban Development	Eknath Shinde	30 December 2019	27 June 2022	SS
Urban Development	Subhash Desai; Additional charge	27 June 2022	29 June 2022	SS
Revenue	Balasaheb Thorat (Acting)	28 November 2019	30 December 2019	INC
Revenue	Balasaheb Thorat	30 December 2019	29 June 2022	INC
Industries	Subhash Desai (Acting)	28 November 2019	30 December 2019	SS
Industries	Subhash Desai	30 December 2019	29 June 2022	SS
Mining Department	Subhash Desai (Acting)	28 November 2019	30 December 2019	SS
Mining Department	Subhash Desai	30 December 2019	29 June 2022	SS
Marathi Language	Subhash Desai (Acting)	28 November 2019	30 December 2019	SS
Marathi Language	Subhash Desai	30 December 2019	29 June 2022	SS
Energy, New and Renewable Energy	Balasaheb Thorat (Acting)	28 November 2019	30 December 2019	INC
Energy, New and Renewable Energy	Nitin Raut	30 December 2019	29 June 2022	INC
Transport	Subhash Desai (Acting)	28 November 2019	30 December 2019	SS
Transport	Anil Parab	30 December 2019	29 June 2022	SS
Parliamentary Affairs	Eknath Shinde (Acting)	28 November 2019	30 December 2019	SS
Parliamentary Affairs	Anil Parab	30 December 2019	29 June 2022	SS
Housing	Jayant Patil (Acting)	28 November 2019	30 December 2019	NCP
Housing	Jitendra Awhad	30 December 2019	29 June 2022	NCP
Woman and Child Development	Nitin Raut (Acting)	28 November 2019	30 December 2019	INC
Woman and Child Development	Yashomati Chandrakant Thakur	30 December 2019	29 June 2022	INC
Water Supply	Eknath Shinde (Acting)	28 November 2019	30 December 2019	SS
Water Supply	Gulabrao Patil	30 December 2019	27 June 2022	SS
Water Supply	Anil Parab; Additional charge	27 June 2022	29 June 2022	SS
Sanitation	Eknath Shinde (Acting)	28 November 2019	30 December 2019	SS
Sanitation	Gulabrao Patil	30 December 2019	27 June 2022	SS
Sanitation	Anil Parab; Additional charge	27 June 2022	29 June 2022	SS
Food, Civil Supplies and Consumer	Jayant Patil (Acting)	28 November 2019	30 December 2019	NCP
Food, Civil Supplies and Consumer	Chhagan Bhujbal	30 December 2019	29 June 2022	NCP
Tribal Development	Nitin Raut (Acting)	28 November 2019	30 December 2019	INC
Tribal Development	Adv. Kagda Chandya Padvi	30 December 2019	29 June 2022	INC
Environment and Climate Change	Subhash Desai (Acting)	28 November 2019	30 December 2019	SS
Environment and Climate Change	Aaditya Thackeray	30 December 2019	29 June 2022	SS
Tourism	Eknath Shinde (Acting)	28 November 2019	30 December 2019	SS
Tourism	Aaditya Thackeray	30 December 2019	29 June 2022	SS
Protocol	Subhash Desai (Acting)	28 November 2019	30 December 2019	SS
Protocol	Aaditya Thackeray	30 December 2019	29 June 2022	SS
Medical Education	Balasaheb Thorat (Acting)	28 November 2019	30 December 2019	INC
Medical Education	Amit Deshmukh	30 December 2019	29 June 2022	INC
Cultural Affairs	Subhash Desai (Acting)	28 November 2019	30 December 2019	SS
Cultural Affairs	Amit Deshmukh	30 December 2019	29 June 2022	INC
Higher and Technical Education	Subhash Desai (Acting)	28 November 2019	30 December 2019	SS
Higher and Technical Education	Uday Samant	30 December 2019	27 June 2022	SS
Higher and Technical Education	Aaditya Thackeray; Additional charge	27 June 2022	29 June 2022	SS
Food and Drug Administration	Chhagan Bhujbal (Acting)	28 November 2019	30 December 2019	NCP
Food and Drug Administration	Rajendra Shingne	30 December 2019	29 June 2022	NCP
School Education	Balasaheb Thorat (Acting)	28 November 2019	30 December 2019	INC
School Education	Varsha Gaikwad	30 December 2019	29 June 2022	INC
Employment Guarantee	Subhash Desai (Acting)	28 November 2019	30 December 2019	SS
Employment Guarantee	Sandipanrao Bhumre	30 December 2019	27 June 2022	SS
Employment Guarantee	Shankarrao Gadakh; Additional charge	27 June 2022	29 June 2022	SS
Horticulture	Subhash Desai (Acting)	28 November 2019	30 December 2019	SS
Horticulture	Sandipanrao Bhumre	30 December 2019	27 June 2022	SS
Horticulture	Shankarrao Gadakh; Additional charge	27 June 2022	29 June 2022	SS
Co-operation	Jayant Patil (Acting)	28 November 2019	30 December 2019	NCP
Co-operation	Shamrao Pandurang Patil	30 December 2019	29 June 2022	NCP
Marketing	Jayant Patil (Acting)	28 November 2019	30 December 2019	NCP
Marketing	Shamrao Pandurang Patil	30 December 2019	29 June 2022	NCP
Textiles	Nitin Raut (Acting)	28 November 2019	30 December 2019	INC
Textiles	Aslam Shaikh	30 December 2019	29 June 2022	INC
Fisheries Department	Balasaheb Thorat (Acting)	28 November 2019	30 December 2019	INC
Fisheries Department	Aslam Shaikh	30 December 2019	29 June 2022	INC
Ports Development	Balasaheb Thorat (Acting)	28 November 2019	30 December 2019	INC
Ports Development	Aslam Shaikh	30 December 2019	29 June 2022	INC
Public Health and Family Welfare	Jayant Patil (Acting)	28 November 2019	30 December 2019	NCP
Public Health and Family Welfare	Rajesh Tope	30 December 2019	29 June 2022	NCP
Other Backward Classes	Nitin Raut (Acting)	28 November 2019	30 December 2019	INC
Other Backward Classes	Vijay Namdevrao Wadettiwar	30 December 2019	29 June 2022	INC
Agriculture	Subhash Desai (Acting)	28 November 2019	30 December 2019	SS
Agriculture	Dadaji Bhuse	30 December 2019	27 June 2022	SS
Agriculture	Shankarrao Gadakh; Additional charge	27 June 2022	29 June 2022	SS
Other Backward Bahujan Welfare	Nitin Raut (Acting)'	28 November 2019	30 December 2019	INC
Other Backward Bahujan Welfare	Vijay Namdevrao Wadettiwar	30 December 2019	29 June 2022	INC
Ex. Servicemen Welfare	Eknath Shinde (Acting)	28 November 2019	30 December 2019	SS
Ex. Servicemen Welfare	Dadaji Bhuse	30 December 2019	27 June 2022	SS
Ex. Servicemen Welfare	Shankarrao Gadakh; Additional charge	27 June 2022	29 June 2022	SS
Socially and Educationally Backward Classes	Nitin Raut (Acting)	28 November 2019	30 December 2019	INC
Socially and Educationally Backward Classes	Vijay Namdevrao Wadettiwar	30 December 2019	29 June 2022	INC
Social Justice	Chhagan Bhujbal (Acting)	28 November 2019	30 December 2019	NCP
Social Justice	Dhananjay Munde	30 December 2019	29 June 2022	NCP
Vimukta Jati	Nitin Raut (Acting)	28 November 2019	30 December 2019	INC
Vimukta Jati	Vijay Namdevrao Wadettiwar	30 December 2019	29 June 2022	INC
Special Assistance	Chhagan Bhujbal (Acting)	28 November 2019	30 December 2019	NCP
Special Assistance	Dhananjay Munde	30 December 2019	29 June 2022	NCP
Nomadic Tribes	Nitin Raut (Acting)	28 November 2019	30 December 2019	INC
Nomadic Tribes	Vijay Namdevrao Wadettiwar	30 December 2019	29 June 2022	INC
Minority Development and Aukaf	Jayant Patil (Acting)	28 November 2019	30 December 2019	NCP
Minority Development and Aukaf	Nawab Malik	30 December 2019	27 March 2022	NCP
Minority Development and Aukaf	Jitendra Awhad; Additional charge	27 March 2022	29 June 2022	NCP
Special Backward Classes Welfare	Nitin Raut (Acting)	28 November 2019	30 December 2019	INC
Special Backward Classes Welfare	Vijay Namdevrao Wadettiwar	30 December 2019	29 June 2022	INC
Animal Husbandry	Balasaheb Thorat (Acting)	28 November 2019	30 December 2019	INC
Animal Husbandry	Sunil Chhatrapal Kedar	30 December 2019	29 June 2022	INC
Khar Land Development	Balasaheb Thorat (Acting)	28 November 2019	30 December 2019	INC
Khar Land Development	Vijay Namdevrao Wadettiwar	30 December 2019	29 June 2022	INC
Dairy Development	Balasaheb Thorat (Acting)	28 November 2019	30 December 2019	INC
Dairy Development	Sunil Chhatrapal Kedar	30 December 2019	29 June 2022	INC
Earthquake Rehabilitation	Subhash Desai (Acting)	28 November 2019	30 December 2019	SS
Earthquake Rehabilitation	Vijay Namdevrao Wadettiwar	30 December 2019	29 June 2022	INC
Sports and Youth Welfare	Subhash Desai (Acting)	28 November 2019	30 December 2019	SS
Sports and Youth Welfare	Sunil Chhatrapal Kedar	30 December 2019	29 June 2022	INC
Skill Development and Entrepreneurship	Chhagan Bhujbal (Acting)	28 November 2019	30 December 2019	NCP
Skill Development and Entrepreneurship	Nawab Malik	30 December 2019	27 March 2022	NCP
Skill Development and Entrepreneurship	Rajesh Tope; Additional charge	27 March 2022	29 June 2022	NCP
Disaster Management	Nitin Raut (Acting)	28 November 2019	30 December 2019	INC
Disaster Management	Sanjay Rathod	30 December 2019	28 February 2021	SS
Disaster Management	Uddhav Thackeray (Additional Charge); Chief Minister	28 February 2021	9 July 2021	SS
Disaster Management	Vijay Namdevrao Wadettiwar	9 July 2021	29 June 2022	INC
Relief & Rehabilitation	Nitin Raut (Acting)	28 November 2019	30 December 2019	INC
Relief & Rehabilitation	Sanjay Rathod	30 December 2019	28 February 2021	SS
Relief & Rehabilitation	Uddhav Thackeray (Additional Charge); Chief Minister	28 February 2021	9 July 2021	SS
Relief & Rehabilitation	Vijay Namdevrao Wadettiwar	9 July 2021	29 June 2022	INC
Majority Welfare Development	Subhash Desai (Acting)	28 November 2019	30 December 2019	SS
Majority Welfare Development	Vijay Namdevrao Wadettiwar	30 December 2019	29 June 2022	INC
Soil and Water Conservation	Eknath Shinde (Acting)	28 November 2019	30 December 2019	SS
Soil and Water Conservation	Shankarrao Gadakh	30 December 2019	29 June 2022	SS
Rural Development	Chhagan Bhujbal (Acting)	28 November 2019	30 December 2019	NCP
Rural Development	Hasan Mushrif	30 December 2019	29 June 2022	NCP
Labour	Jayant Patil (Acting)	28 November 2019	30 December 2019	NCP
Labour	Dilip Walse-Patil	30 December 2019	5 April 2021	NCP
Labour	Hasan Mushrif (Additional Charge)	30 December 2019	29 June 2022	NCP

== District Wise break up ==
Representation of Ministers by district
1. Ahmednagar (7.51%)
2. Amaravati (4.87%)
3. Aurangabad (4.87%)
4. Beed (2.43%)
5. Buldhana (2.43%)
6. Chandrapur (2.43%)
7. Thane (4.87%)
8. Jalgaon (2.43%)
9. Jalna (2.43%)
10. Kolhapur (7.31%)
11. Latur (4.87%)
12. Mumbai City (4.87%)
13. Mumbai Suburban (9.75%)
14. Nagpur (4.87%)
15. Nanded (2.43%)
16. Nandurbar (2.43%)
17. Nashik (4.87%)
18. Pune (7.31%)
19. Raigad (2.43%)
20. Ratnagiri (4.87%)
21. Sangli (4.87%)
22. Satara (4.87%)

District	Ministers	Name	Party	Designation
Ahmednagar	3	Balasaheb Thorat	Indian National Congress	Cabinet Minister
Ahmednagar	3	Shankarrao Gadakh	Shivsena	Cabinet Minister
Ahmednagar	3	Prajakt Tanpure	Nationalist Congress Party	Minister of State
Akola	0	-		
Amaravati	2	Yashomati Chandrakant Thakur	Indian National Congress	Cabinet Minister
Amaravati	2	Bachchu Kadu	Prahar Janshakti Party(SHS)	Minister of State
Aurangabad	2	Sandipanrao Bhumre	Shivsena	Cabinet Minister
Aurangabad	2	Abdul Sattar Abdul Nabi	Shivsena	Minister of State
Beed	1	Dhananjay Munde	Nationalist Congress Party	Cabinet Minister
Bhandara	0	-		
Buldhana	1	Rajendra Shingne	Nationalist Congress Party	Cabinet Minister
Chandrapur		Vijay Namdevrao Wadettiwar	Indian National Congress	Cabinet Minister
Dhule	0	-		
Gadchiroli	0	-		
Gondiya	0	-		
Hingoli	0	-		
Jalgaon	1	Gulab Raghunath Patil	Shivsena	Cabinet Minister
Jalna	1	Rajesh Tope	Nationalist Congress Party	Cabinet Minister
Kolhapur	3	Hasan Mushrif	Nationalist Congress Party	Cabinet Minister
Kolhapur	3	Satej Patil	Indian National Congress	Minister of State
Kolhapur	3	Rajendra Patil	Independent(SHS)	Minister of State
Latur	2	Amit Deshmukh	Indian National Congress	Cabinet Minister
Latur	2	Sanjay Bansode	Nationalist Congress Party	Minister of State
Mumbai City	2	Aaditya Thackeray	Shivsena	Cabinet Minister
Mumbai City	2	Varsha Gaikwad	Indian National Congress	Cabinet Minister
Mumbai Suburban	4	Uddhav Thackeray	Shivsena	Chief Minister
Mumbai Suburban	4	Subhash Desai	Shivsena	Cabinet Minister
Mumbai Suburban	4	Aslam Shaikh	Indian National Congress	Cabinet Minister
Mumbai Suburban	4	Nawab Malik	Nationalist Congress Party	Cabinet Minister
Nagpur	2	Nitin Raut	Indian National Congress	Cabinet Minister
Nagpur	2	Sunil Chhatrapal Kedar	Indian National Congress	Cabinet Minister
Nanded	1	Ashok Chavan	Indian National Congress	Cabinet Minister
Nandurbar	1	K. C. Padavi	Indian National Congress	Cabinet Minister
Nashik	2	Dadaji Bhuse	Shivsena	Cabinet Minister
Nashik	2	Chhagan Bhujbal	Nationalist Congress Party	Cabinet Minister
Osmanabad	0	-		
Palghar	0	-		
Parbhani	0	-		
Pune	3	Ajit Pawar	Nationalist Congress Party	Deputy Chief Minister
Pune	3	Dattatray Vithoba Bharne	Nationalist Congress Party	Minister of State
Pune	3	Dilip Walse-Patil	Nationalist Congress Party	Cabinet Minister
Raigad	1	Aditi Sunil Tatkare	Nationalist Congress Party	Minister of State
Ratnagiri	2	Anil Parab	Shivsena	Cabinet Minister
Ratnagiri	2	Uday Samant	Shivsena	Cabinet Minister
Sangli	2	Jayant Patil	Nationalist Congress Party	Cabinet Minister
Sangli	2	Vishwajeet Kadam	Indian National Congress	Minister of State
Satara	2	Shambhuraj Desai	Shivsena	Minister of State
Satara	2	Balasaheb Alias Shamrao Pandurang Patil	Nationalist Congress Party	Cabinet Minister
Sindhudurg	0	-		
Solapur	0	-		
Thane	2	Eknath Shinde	Shivsena	Cabinet Minister
Thane	2	Jitendra Awhad	Nationalist Congress Party	Cabinet Minister
Wardha	0	-		
Washim	0	-		
Yavatmal	0	-		

== Guardian Ministers ==
Sr No.	District	Guardian Minister	Party	Tenure	
01	Ahmednagar	Hasan Mushrif	Nationalist Congress Party	09 January 2020	29 June 2022
02	Akola	Omprakash Babarao Kadu	Prahar Janshakti Party	09 January 2020	27 June 2022
02	Akola	Amit Deshmukh (Additional Charge)	Indian National Congress	27 June 2022	29 June 2022
03	Amaravati	Yashomati Chandrakant Thakur	Indian National Congress	09 January 2020	29 June 2022
04	Aurangabad	Subhash Desai	Shiv Sena	09 January 2020	29 June 2022
05	Beed	Dhananjay Munde	Nationalist Congress Party	09 January 2020	29 June 2022
06	Bhandara	Vishwajeet Kadam	Indian National Congress	09 January 2020	29 June 2022
07	Buldhana	Rajendra Shingne	Nationalist Congress Party	09 January 2020	29 June 2022
08	Chandrapur	Vijay Namdevrao Wadettiwar	Indian National Congress	09 January 2020	29 June 2022
09	Dhule	Abdul Sattar Abdul Nabi	Shiv Sena	09 January 2020	27 June 2022
09	Dhule	Balasaheb Thorat (Additional Charge)	Indian National Congress	27 June 2022	29 June 2022
10	Gadchiroli	Eknath Shinde	Shiv Sena	09 January 2020	27 June 2022
10	Gadchiroli	Vijay Namdevrao Wadettiwar (Additional Charge)	Indian National Congress	27 June 2022	29 June 2022
11	Gondiya	Anil Deshmukh	Nationalist Congress Party	09 January 2020	05 April 2021
11	Gondiya	Nawab Malik	Nationalist Congress Party	05 April 2021	27 March 2022
11	Gondiya	Prajakt Tanpure (Additional Charge)	Nationalist Congress Party	27 March 2022	29 June 2022
12	Hingoli	Varsha Gaikwad	Indian National Congress	09 January 2020	29 June 2022
13	Jalgaon	Gulab Raghunath Patil	Shiv Sena	09 January 2020	27 June 2022
13	Jalgaon	Aaditya Uddhav Thackeray (Additional Charge)	Shiv Sena	27 June 2022	29 June 2022
14	Jalna	Rajesh Tope	Nationalist Congress Party	09 January 2020	29 June 2022
15	Kolhapur	Balasaheb Thorat	Indian National Congress	09 January 2020	20 January 2020
15	Kolhapur	Satej Patil	Indian National Congress	20 January 2020	29 June 2022
16	Latur	Amit Deshmukh	Indian National Congress	09 January 2020	29 June 2022
17	Mumbai City	Aslam Ramzan Ali Shaikh	Indian National Congress	09 January 2020	29 June 2022
18	Mumbai Suburban	Aaditya Uddhav Thackeray	Shiv Sena	09 January 2020	29 June 2022
19	Nagpur	Dr. Nitin Kashinath Raut	INC	09 January 2020	29 June 2022
20	Nanded	Ashok Chavan	Indian National Congress	09 January 2020	29 June 2022
21	Nandurbar	Kagda Chandya Padvi	Indian National Congress	09 January 2020	29 June 2022
22	Nashik	Chhagan Bhujbal	Nationalist Congress Party	09 January 2020	29 June 2022
23	Osmanabad	Shankarrao Gadakh	Independence Supported to Shiv Sena	09 January 2020	29 June 2022
24	Palghar	Dadaji Bhuse	Shiv Sena	09 January 2020	27 June 2022
24	Palghar	Aditi Sunil Tatkare (Additional Charge)	Nationalist Congress Party	27 June 2022	29 June 2022
25	Parbhani	Nawab Malik	Nationalist Congress Party	09 January 2020	27 March 2022
25	Parbhani	Dhananjay Munde (Additional Charge)	Nationalist Congress Party	27 March 2022	29 June 2022
26	Pune	Ajit Pawar (Deputy Chief Minister)	Nationalist Congress Party	09 January 2020	29 June 2022
27	Raigad	Aditi Sunil Tatkare	Nationalist Congress Party	09 January 2020	29 June 2022
28	Ratnagiri	Anil Parab	Shiv Sena	09 January 2020	29 June 2022
29	Sangli	Jayant Patil	Nationalist Congress Party	09 January 2020	29 June 2022
30	Satara	Shamrao Pandurang Patil	Nationalist Congress Party	09 January 2020	29 June 2022
31	Sindhudurg	Uday Samant	Shiv Sena	09 January 2020	27 June 2022
31	Sindhudurg	Anil Parab (Additional Charge)	Shiv Sena	27 June 2022	29 June 2022
32	Solapur	Dattatray Vithoba Bharne	Nationalist Congress Party	09 January 2020	29 June 2022
33	Thane	Eknath Shinde	Shiv Sena	09 January 2020	27 June 2022
33	Thane	Subhash Desai (Additional Charge)	Shiv Sena	27 June 2022	29 June 2022
34	Wardha	Sunil Chhatrapal Kedar	Indian National Congress	09 January 2020	29 June 2022
35	Washim	Shambhuraj Desai	Shiv Sena	09 January 2020	27 June 2022
35	Washim	Sunil Chhatrapal Kedar (Additional Charge)	Indian National Congress	27 June 2022	29 June 2022
36	Yavatmal	Sandipanrao Bhumre	Shiv Sena	09 January 2020	27 June 2022
36	Yavatmal	Shankarrao Gadakh (Additional Charge)	Independence Supported to Shiv Sena	27 June 2022	29 June 2022

== Ministers by Party ==
Representation of cabinet ministers by party
1. Shiv Sena (32.0%)
2. Nationalist Congress Party (36.0%)
3. Indian National Congress (32.0%)

Party	Cabinet Ministers	Ministers of State	Total Ministers
Shiv Sena	10	4	14
Nationalist Congress Party	11	4	15
Indian National Congress	10	2	12

== Former members ==
SI No.	Name	Constituency	Department	Tenure	Party	Reason
1.	Sanjay Rathod	Digras	Forests Department.; Disaster Management; Relief and Rehabilitation	30 December 2019 – 28 February 2021	SHS	Resignation over allegations for death of a Tiktok Star
2.	Anil Deshmukh	Katol	Home Affairs.	30 December 2019 – 5 April 2021	NCP	Resigned after the Bombay High Court directed CBI to conduct preliminary enquiry into corruption allegations against him.

=== Economy ===
Financial Year	Gross Domestic Product		Gross State Domestic Product		Fiscal Deficit	
2020	₹ 28.05 trillion		₹ 32,24,013 lakh Crore		2.69%	
2021	₹ 30.61 trillion	▲2.56 trillion	₹ 34,81,000 lakh Crore	▲2,56,987 lakh crore	2.24%	▼0.45%
2022 half	₹ 35.81 trillion	▲5.20 trillion	₹ 35,81,000 lakh Crore	▲1,00,000 lakh crore	2.79%	▲0.55%
