= Vitthal Langhe =

Indian politician

Vitthal Vakilrao Langhe Patil (born 2 July 1967) is an Indian politician from Maharashtra. He is an MLA from Nevasa Assembly constituency in Ahmednagar District. He won the 2024 Maharashtra Legislative Assembly election representing the Shiv Sena Party.

== Early life and education ==
Langhe is from Nevasa, Ahmednagar District, Maharashtra. He is the son of Vakilrao Baburao Langhe. He passed Class 8 and later discontinued his studies in 1984 while studying Class 9 at Pravara Public School, Pravaranagar, Rahata taluk, Ahilyanagar District.

== Career ==
Langhe won from Nevasa Assembly constituency representing Shiv Sena in the 2024 Maharashtra Legislative Assembly election. He polled 95,444 votes and defeated his nearest rival, Gadakh Shankarrao Yashwantrao of Shiva Sena (UBT), by a margin of 4,021 votes. He first contested the 2009 Maharashtra Legislative Assembly election on the Bharatiya Janata Party ticket but lost to Shankarrao Gadakh of the Nationalist Congress Party by a margin of 21,486 votes.
