= Abdul Sattar (Maharashtra politician) =

Indian politician

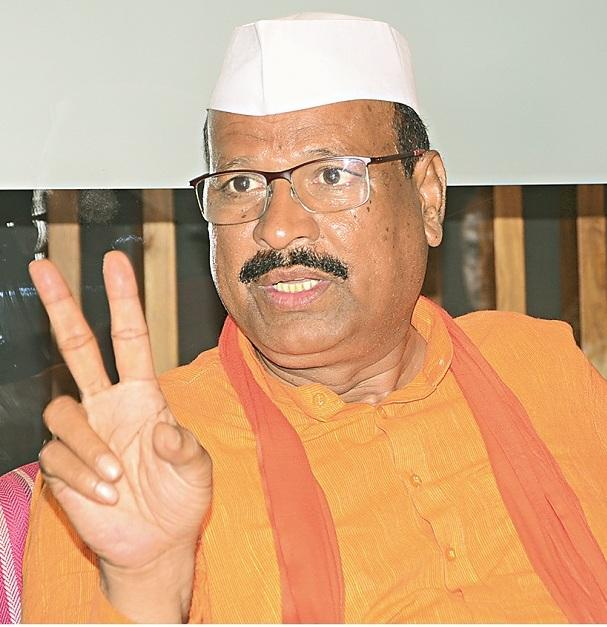
- Sattar 2024

Cabinet Minister Government of Maharashtra
- In office 14 July 2023 – 26 November 2024
- Minister: Minority Development and Aukaf Ministry; Marketing Ministry
- Governor: Ramesh Bais; C. P. Radhakrishnan
- Chief Minister: Eknath Shinde
- Deputy CM: Devendra Fadnavis; Ajit Pawar
- Guardian Minister: Hingoli District; Aurangabad (04 June 2024 additional charge)
- Preceded by: Eknath Shinde CM (Minority Development and Aukaf Ministry); Eknath Shinde CM (Marketing Ministry)

Cabinet Minister Government of Maharashtra
- In office 14 August 2022 – 14 July 2023
- Minister: Agriculture
- Governor: Bhagat Singh Koshyari; Ramesh Bais
- Chief Minister: Eknath Shinde
- Deputy CM: Devendra Fadnavis; Ajit Pawar
- Guardian Minister: Hingoli District
- Preceded by: Shankarrao Gadakh; Additional charge (Agriculture Ministry): Varsha Gaikwad (Hingoli District)
- Succeeded by: Dhananjay Munde

Minister of state Government of Maharashtra
- In office 30 December 2019 – 27 June 2022
- Minister: Revenue; Rural Development; Ports Development; Khar land Development; Special Assistance.
- Governor: Bhagat Singh Koshyari
- Chief Minister: Uddhav Thackeray
- Deputy CM: Ajit Pawar

Member of Maharashtra Legislative Assembly
- Incumbent
- Assumed office 2009
- Preceded by: Sandu Ananada Lokhande
- Constituency: Sillod

Cabinet Minister of Animal Husbandry, Maharashtra
- In office 2014–2014

Member of Maharashtra Legislative Council
- In office 2001–2004

Personal details
- Born: Abdul Sattar Abdul Nabi; 1 January 1965 (age 61) Sillod, Aurangabad District, Maharashtra
- Party: Shiv Sena (2023-Present), (2019-2022)
- Other political affiliations: Indian National Congress (1994–2019); Balasahebanchi Shiv Sena (2022-2023)
- Spouse: Late.Nafisa Begum( Died 2026)
- Children: Abdul Sameer Abdul Sattar (son) Abdul Ameer Abdul Sattar (son)
- Parent: Nabi Abdul Jabbar
- Alma mater: G.P Primary School, Sillod; Yashwantrao Chavan College, Sillod
- Profession: Politician
- Website: https://abdulsattar.in

Abdul Sattar Abdul Nabi is an Indian politician from Maharashtra. He was briefly a minister in 2014 in the Congress government in Maharashtra. In 2019 he left Congress and joined Shiv Sena. He is a three term Member of the Maharashtra Legislative Assembly from the Sillod constituency. He served as the state's Cabinet Minister for Animal Husbandry.

== Political career ==
=== Early career ===
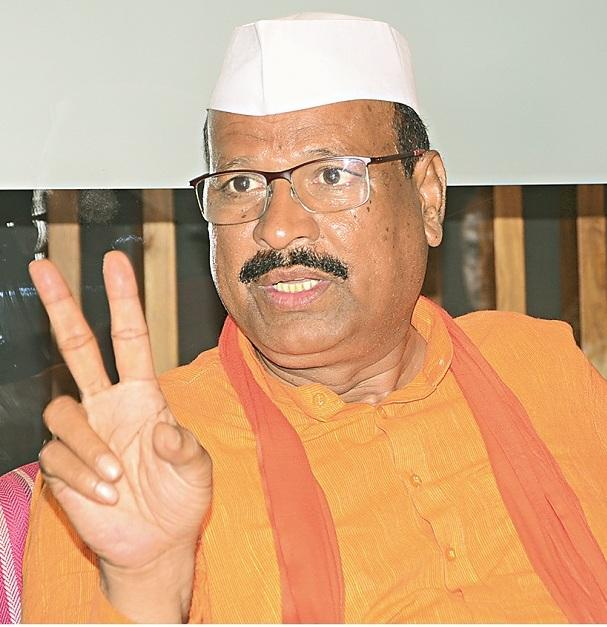
Abdul Sattar

In 1984, Sattar successfully contested the Grampanchayat elections. He entered Taluka politics in 1994–95, becoming the Mayor (Nagaradhyaksha) of Sillod city on 5 March 1994. He approached Congress in 1999 to become a candidate for the Legislative Assembly elections, but was unsuccessful. He stood as an independent and finished second.

He was elected as the MLC of Sillod in 2001. After his term ended as MLA, Abdul Sattar contested the legislative assembly elections of 2004, losing by 301 votes.

He was elected as the MLA for the Sillod constituency from the Aurangabad district in 2009, winning by a margin of 30,000 votes with the help of local political leader Prabhakarr Palodkar, who had recently rejoined the Congress party after 12 years.

In 2014, he won a second term in the legislative assembly, and was appointed a cabinet minister with the animal husbandry, fisheries and dairy development portfolio. In 2016, he petitioned for banning alcohol sales in the state of Maharashtra.

On 22 March 2017, Sattar was suspended until 31 December, along with 18 other MLAs, for interrupting Maharashtra Finance Minister Sudhir Mungantiwar during a state budget session and burning copies of the budget outside the assembly four days earlier. On 15 June 2017, a case was filed against Sattar and 29 others for rioting and assaulting a farmer.

=== Resignation from Congress Party and joining Shiv Sena ===
On 19 December 2016, Sattar resigned as the leader of the Congress Party in Aurangabad district, claiming that the party had not cooperated with him during the 2016 local elections.

On 30 July 2018, Sattar resigned from the Assembly in support of the Maratha quota demand, which would guarantee government jobs and education to be reserved for Marathas.

In March 2019, Sattar was expecting to become the Congress Party candidate for the Aurangabad Lok Sabha constituency for the 2019 Indian general election. On being denied a ticket, which instead went to Subhash Zambad, Sattar resigned from the party. Sattar also removed 300 chairs from the local party office, claiming they belonged to him. Congress party officially expelled Sattar on 20 April 2019 for anti-party activities. In late March 2019, Sattar announced he would join the ruling Bharatiya Janta Party (BJP), but this move was opposed by the local BJP leadership, later Sattar backtracked by saying that his meeting with the Devendra Fadnavis (BJP chief minister) was apolitical. In late June 2019, Sattar met Shiv Sena chief Uddhav Thackeray, fueling speculation that he may join the party.

Sattar officially joined the Shiv Sena party on 2 September 2019 in presence of Shiv Sena chief Uddhav Thackeray.

== Positions held ==
- 2009: Elected to Maharashtra Legislative Assembly
- 2014: Re-Elected to Maharashtra Legislative Assembly
- 2019: Re-Elected to Maharashtra Legislative Assembly
- 2019: Appointed minister of state for Revenue, Rural Development, Ports, Khar land Development and Special Assistance
- 2020: Appointed guardian minister of Dhule district
- 2023: Appointed guardian minister of Hingoli district
- 2023: Appointed cabinet minister of Minority of Development in Aukaf Ministry & Marketing Ministry Additional charge as under Eknath Shinde Ministry in Government of Maharashtra.
- 2024: Re-Elected to Maharashtra Legislative Assembly

== See also ==
- Uddhav Thackeray ministry
