= Dabhadi, Dahanu =

Village in Maharashtra

Dabhadi
- village
- Location in Maharashtra, India Dabhadi (India)
- Coordinates: 20.0546729°N 73.0818468°E
- Country: India
- State: Maharashtra
- District: Palghar
- Taluka: Dahanu
- Elevation: 168 m (551 ft)

Population (2011)
  - Total: 2,099
- Time zone: UTC+5:30 (IST)
- 2011 census code: 551631

Dabhadi is a village in the Palghar district of Maharashtra, India. It is located in the Dahanu taluka.

== Demographics ==
According to the 2011 census of India, Dabhadi has 411 households. The effective literacy rate (i.e. the literacy rate of population excluding children aged 6 and below) is 23.1%.

Demographics (2011 Census)
	Total	Male	Female
Population	2099	1030	1069
Children aged below 6 years	419	209	210
Scheduled caste	1	1	0
Scheduled tribe	2089	1024	1065
Literates	388	230	158
Workers (all)	1074	613	461
Main workers (total)	1015	589	426
Main workers: Cultivators	477	312	165
Main workers: Agricultural labourers	503	249	254
Main workers: Household industry workers	2	1	1
Main workers: Other	33	27	6
Marginal workers (total)	59	24	35
Marginal workers: Cultivators	14	6	8
Marginal workers: Agricultural labourers	43	17	26
Marginal workers: Household industry workers	0	0	0
Marginal workers: Others	2	1	1
Non-workers	1025	417	608
