= Dabhadi Assembly constituency =

Constituency of the Maharashtra legislative assembly in India

Dabhadi
- Former constituency for the Maharashtra Legislative Assembly

Constituency details
- Country: India
- Region: Western India
- State: Maharashtra
- Established: 1967
- Abolished: 2008
- Total electors: 2,11,377

Dabhadi Assembly constituency was an assembly constituency in the India state of Maharashtra.

== Members of the Legislative Assembly ==
Election	Member	Party
1967	Baliram Waman Hiray	Indian National Congress
1972	Baliram Waman Hiray	Indian National Congress
1978	Baliram Waman Hiray	Indian National Congress (I)
1980	Baliram Waman Hiray	Indian National Congress (I)
1985	Pushpatai Vyakatarao Hiray	Indian Congress (Socialist)
1990	Pushpatai Vyakatarao Hiray	Indian National Congress
1995	Pushpatai Vyakatarao Hiray	Indian National Congress
1999	Prashant Vyankatrao Hiray	Nationalist Congress Party
2004	Dadaji Bhuse	Independent politician

== Election results ==
=== Assembly Election 2004 ===
2004 Maharashtra Legislative Assembly election : Dabhadi
Party	Candidate	Votes	%	±%
Independent	Dadaji Bhuse	68,079	45.01%	New
NCP	Hiray Prashant Vyankatrao	59,062	39.05%	▲4.09
BJP	Hiray Prasad Baliram	15,816	10.46%	▼19.40
Independent	Hiray Prasad Bapu	1,944	1.29%	New
BSP	More Ramesh Ragho	1,543	1.02%	New
Independent	Nikam Suresh Bhila	1,262	0.83%	New
SP	Nazir Ah. Irshad Ah	1,108	0.73%	New
Margin of victory		9,017	5.96%	▲0.86
Turnout		1,51,258	71.56%	▲1.51
Registered electors		2,11,377		▲25.31
Independent gain from NCP		Swing	▲10.05	

=== Assembly Election 1999 ===
1999 Maharashtra Legislative Assembly election : Dabhadi
Party	Candidate	Votes	%	±%
NCP	Hiray Prashant Vyankatrao	41,304	34.95%	New
BJP	Nikam Suresh Ramrao	35,275	29.85%	▲3.57
INC	Hiray Baliram Waman	30,697	25.98%	▼7.50
Margin of victory		6,029	5.10%	▲3.09
Turnout		1,18,165	64.08%	▲0.36
Registered electors		1,68,685		▼1.92
NCP gain from INC		Swing	▲1.47	

=== Assembly Election 1995 ===
1995 Maharashtra Legislative Assembly election : Dabhadi
Party	Candidate	Votes	%	±%
INC	Hiray Pushpatai Vyakatarao	40,126	33.48%	▼13.17
Independent	Hiray Baliram Waman	37,716	31.47%	New
BJP	Nikam Suresh Ramrao	31,502	26.28%	New
JD	Shinde Deelipsing Bhagatsing	1,788	1.49%	▼10.13
BSP	Nikam Laxman Kisan	1,162	0.97%	New
Independent	Nikam Bandurao Yadav	1,018	0.85%	New
Independent	Sk. Rasool Sk. Ramzan	821	0.69%	New
Margin of victory		2,410	2.01%	▼9.67
Turnout		1,19,849	67.76%	▲5.44
Registered electors		1,71,979		▲18.60
INC hold		Swing	▼13.17	

=== Assembly Election 1990 ===
1990 Maharashtra Legislative Assembly election : Dabhadi
Party	Candidate	Votes	%	±%
INC	Hiray Pushpatai Vyakatarao	43,460	46.65%	▲1.64
SS	Nikam Ashok Damodar	32,577	34.97%	New
JD	Ahire Narendra Meghsham	10,830	11.62%	New
Margin of victory		10,883	11.68%	▲7.72
Turnout		93,165	61.23%	▼5.26
Registered electors		1,45,006		▲23.77
INC gain from IC(S)		Swing	▼2.32	

=== Assembly Election 1985 ===
1985 Maharashtra Legislative Assembly election : Dabhadi
Party	Candidate	Votes	%	±%
IC(S)	Hiray Pushpatai Vyakatarao	39,876	48.97%	New
INC	Hiray Indirabai Baliram	36,648	45.00%	New
RPI	Garud Deoraj Ramchandra	1,603	1.97%	New
Independent	Mahant Taptigiriji Guru Somwargiriji Khadeshwari	768	0.94%	New
Margin of victory		3,228	3.96%	▼7.43
Turnout		81,433	68.11%	▼0.45
Registered electors		1,17,155		▲14.97
IC(S) gain from INC(I)		Swing	▼5.61	

=== Assembly Election 1980 ===
1980 Maharashtra Legislative Assembly election : Dabhadi
Party	Candidate	Votes	%	±%
INC(I)	Hiray Baliram Waman	38,906	54.58%	▲7.62
INC(U)	Hiray Vyankatrao Bhausaheb	30,785	43.19%	New
Margin of victory		8,121	11.39%	▲0.15
Turnout		71,285	68.39%	▼5.99
Registered electors		1,01,900		▲10.38
INC(I) hold		Swing		

=== Assembly Election 1978 ===
1978 Maharashtra Legislative Assembly election : Dabhadi
Party	Candidate	Votes	%	±%
INC(I)	Hiray Baliram Waman	32,918	46.95%	New
JP	Patil Shivaji Namdeo	25,036	35.71%	New
INC	Pawar Tryambak Ramji	8,088	11.54%	▼42.87
CPI	Nikam Rajaram Damodar	1,795	2.56%	New
Margin of victory		7,882	11.24%	▼9.41
Turnout		70,108	73.48%	▲15.69
Registered electors		92,318		▲5.07
INC(I) gain from INC		Swing	▼7.45	

=== Assembly Election 1972 ===
1972 Maharashtra Legislative Assembly election : Dabhadi
Party	Candidate	Votes	%	±%
INC	Hiray Baliram Waman	28,805	54.41%	▼7.55
SSP	Shivaji Namdeo Patil	17,868	33.75%	New
RPI	Damodar Zipru Supare	2,885	5.45%	New
Independent	Bachhav Sukhdeo Jairam	1,309	2.47%	New
Margin of victory		10,937	20.66%	▼17.80
Turnout		52,945	57.89%	▼9.07
Registered electors		87,867		▲20.27
INC hold		Swing	▼7.55	

=== Assembly Election 1967 ===
1967 Maharashtra Legislative Assembly election : Dabhadi
Party	Candidate	Votes	%	±%
INC	Hiray Baliram Waman	31,382	61.96%	New
SSP	Shivaji Namdeo Patil	11,904	23.50%	New
Independent	R. J. Pawaar	1,957	3.86%	New
Independent	R. D. Nikam	975	1.84%	New
Margin of victory		19,478	38.46%	
Turnout		50,650	63.26%	
Registered electors		73,059		
INC win (new seat)				
