= Sillod Assembly constituency =

Constituency of the Maharashtra legislative assembly in India

Coordinates: 20.31°N 75.65°E

Sillod
- Constituency No. 104 for the Maharashtra Legislative Assembly

Constituency details
- Country: India
- Region: Western India
- State: Maharashtra
- Division: Aurangabad
- District: Aurangabad
- Lok Sabha constituency: Jalna
- Established: 1952
- Total electors: 358,550
- Reservation: None

Member of Legislative Assembly
- 15th Maharashtra Legislative Assembly
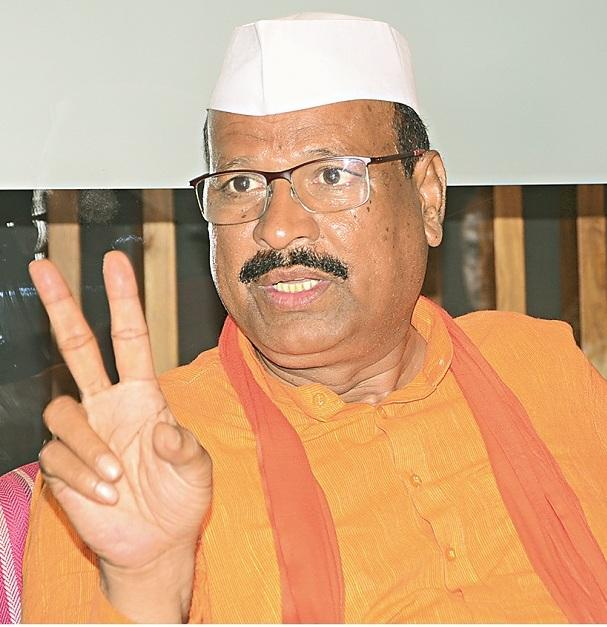
- Incumbent Abdul Sattar Abdul Nabi
- Party: SHS
- Alliance: NDA
- Elected year: 2024

Sillod Assembly constituency is one of the 288 Vidhan Sabha (legislative assembly) constituencies of Maharashtra state in western India.

== Overview ==
Sillod is part of Jalna Lok Sabha constituency along with five other Vidhan Sabha segments, namely Badnapur, Jalna and Bhokardan in Jalna district and Phulambri and Paithan in Aurangabad district.

== Members of the Legislative Assembly ==
Year	Member	Party
1952	Nago Rao	Indian National Congress
1957	Nago Rao	Indian National Congress
1962	Baburao Janglu	Indian National Congress
1967	Shivram Mankar	Indian National Congress
1972	Shivram Mankar	Indian National Congress
1978	Namdev Gadekar	Janata Party
1980	Manikrao Palodkar	Indian National Congress (U)
1985	Manikrao Palodkar	Indian National Congress
1990	Manikrao Palodkar	Indian National Congress
1995	Kisanrao Kale	Bharatiya Janata Party
1999	Kisanrao Kale	Bharatiya Janata Party
2004	Sandu Lokhande	Bharatiya Janata Party
2009	Abdul Sattar	Indian National Congress
2014	Abdul Sattar	Indian National Congress
2019	Abdul Sattar	Shiv Sena
2024	Abdul Sattar	Shiv Sena

== Election results ==
=== Assembly Election 2024 ===
2024 Maharashtra Legislative Assembly election : Sillod
Party	Candidate	Votes	%	±%
SS	Abdul Sattar Abdul Nabi	137,960	47.81%	▼4.56
SS(UBT)	Bankar Suresh Pandurang	135,540	46.97%	New
Independent	Rahul Ankush Rathod	2,705	0.94%	New
VBA	Pathan Banekhan Noorkhan	1,989	0.69%	▼2.63
Independent	Raju Pandurang Sathe	1,830	0.63%	New
NOTA	None of the above	725	0.25%	▼0.96
Margin of victory		2,420	0.84%	▼9.51
Turnout		289,312	80.69%	▲5.41
Total valid votes		288,587		
Registered electors		358,550		▲13.14
SS hold		Swing	▼4.56	

=== Assembly Election 2019 ===
2019 Maharashtra Legislative Assembly election : Sillod
Party	Candidate	Votes	%	±%
SS	Abdul Sattar Abdul Nabi	123,383	52.37%	▲44.68
Independent	Prabhakar Manikrao Palodkar	99,002	42.02%	New
VBA	Dadarao Kisanrao Wankhede	7,817	3.32%	New
INC	Kaisar Azad Shaikh	2,962	1.26%	▼45.19
NOTA	None of the above	2,844	1.21%	▼0.30
Margin of victory		24,381	10.35%	▲3.62
Turnout		238,569	75.28%	▼0.09
Total valid votes		235,584		
Registered electors		316,918		▲13.81
SS gain from INC		Swing	▲5.92	

=== Assembly Election 2014 ===
2014 Maharashtra Legislative Assembly election : Sillod
Party	Candidate	Votes	%	±%
INC	Abdul Sattar Abdul Nabi	96,038	46.45%	▼8.55
BJP	Bankar Suresh Pandurang	82,117	39.72%	▼0.29
SS	Mirakar Sunil Prabhakarrao	15,909	7.69%	New
MNS	Kale Dipali Madhukar	3,465	1.68%	New
NOTA	None of the above	3,121	1.51%	New
NCP	Mankar Raju Dinkar	1,824	0.88%	New
BSP	Aalne Dadarao Shriram	1,749	0.85%	▼0.69
Independent	Vinod Ashok Pagare	1,528	0.74%	New
Margin of victory		13,921	6.73%	▼8.27
Turnout		209,887	75.37%	▲4.31
Total valid votes		206,760		
Registered electors		278,474		▲10.91
INC hold		Swing	▼8.55	

=== Assembly Election 2009 ===
2009 Maharashtra Legislative Assembly election : Sillod
Party	Candidate	Votes	%	±%
INC	Abdul Sattar Abdul Nabi	98,131	55.00%	▲17.76
BJP	Bankar Suresh Pandurang	71,378	40.01%	▲2.56
BSP	Pardhe Prabhakar Sandu	2,739	1.54%	▼0.20
Independent	Sonawane Ashok Vithal	2,413	1.35%	New
Independent	Banekha Nurkha Pathan	1,107	0.62%	New
Independent	Tadvi Alibaba Rashid	1,086	0.61%	New
Margin of victory		26,753	15.00%	▲14.79
Turnout		178,413	71.06%	▼3.31
Total valid votes		178,412		
Registered electors		251,080		▲28.81
INC gain from BJP		Swing	▲17.55	

=== Assembly Election 2004 ===
2004 Maharashtra Legislative Assembly election : Sillod
Party	Candidate	Votes	%	±%
BJP	Lokhande Sandu Ananada	54,290	37.45%	▼0.90
INC	Abdul Sattar Abdul Nabi	53,989	37.24%	▲25.11
Independent	Kale Kisanrao Laxmanrao	25,898	17.87%	New
BBM	Pathan Banekhan Noorkhan	3,329	2.30%	New
Independent	Sonawane Ashok Vithal	2,989	2.06%	New
BSP	Pardhe Prabhakar Sandu	2,525	1.74%	▲0.75
Independent	Tadvi Budhan Ahmed	1,025	0.71%	New
NLP	Salim Daulat Landge	912	0.63%	New
Margin of victory		301	0.21%	▼13.43
Turnout		144,965	74.37%	▲1.23
Total valid votes		144,957		
Registered electors		194,917		▲16.61
BJP hold		Swing	▼0.90	

=== Assembly Election 1999 ===
1999 Maharashtra Legislative Assembly election : Sillod
Party	Candidate	Votes	%	±%
BJP	Kale Kisanrao Laxmanrao	43,079	38.35%	▼6.05
Independent	Abdul Sattar Abdul Nabi	27,760	24.71%	New
NCP	Palodkar Prabhakarrao Manikrao	26,739	23.81%	New
INC	Kale Rangnath Baburaoji	13,630	12.13%	▼20.88
BSP	Dandge Laxmikant Ganpatrao	1,113	0.99%	
Margin of victory		15,319	13.64%	▲2.26
Turnout		122,259	73.14%	▼1.38
Total valid votes		112,321		
Registered electors		167,151		▼0.19
BJP hold		Swing	▼6.05	

=== Assembly Election 1995 ===
1995 Maharashtra Legislative Assembly election : Sillod
Party	Candidate	Votes	%	±%
BJP	Kale Kisanrao Laxmanrao	53,005	44.40%	▲10.12
INC	Manikrao Palodkar Sandu	39,414	33.01%	▼9.73
JD	Banekha Nurkha	23,333	19.54%	▲0.51
BSP	Motiram Ghadmode	1,178	0.99%	▲0.22
Independent	Laxman Kamble	797	0.67%	New
Margin of victory		13,591	11.38%	▲2.92
Turnout		124,796	74.52%	▲9.40
Total valid votes		119,391		
Registered electors		167,468		▲12.90
BJP gain from INC		Swing	▲1.66	

=== Assembly Election 1990 ===
1990 Maharashtra Legislative Assembly election : Sillod
Party	Candidate	Votes	%	±%
INC	Manikrao Palodkar Sandu	40,021	42.74%	▼1.12
BJP	Kale Gulabrao Laxmanrao	32,098	34.28%	New
JD	Uttamsinha Rajdhar Pawar	17,816	19.03%	New
Independent	Arak Shivaji Vitthal	742	0.79%	New
BSP	Sukhdeorao Gudhekar	718	0.77%	New
Margin of victory		7,923	8.46%	▼4.14
Turnout		96,598	65.12%	▼3.45
Total valid votes		93,637		
Registered electors		148,335		▲26.49
INC hold		Swing	▼1.12	

=== Assembly Election 1985 ===
1985 Maharashtra Legislative Assembly election : Sillod
Party	Candidate	Votes	%	±%
INC	Manikrao Palodkar Sandu	34,377	43.86%	New
IC(S)	Pathrikar Dwarkadas Yeshwantrao	24,501	31.26%	New
Independent	Pandagale Rama Jankiram	17,828	22.75%	New
Independent	Daware Shripat Gajaji	1,004	1.28%	New
Margin of victory		9,876	12.60%	▼1.70
Turnout		80,410	68.57%	▲4.01
Total valid votes		78,373		
Registered electors		117,274		▲14.38
INC gain from INC(U)		Swing	▼8.17	

=== Assembly Election 1980 ===
1980 Maharashtra Legislative Assembly election : Sillod
Party	Candidate	Votes	%	±%
INC(U)	Manikrao Palodkar Sandu	33,293	52.03%	New
INC(I)	Kale Baburao Jangloo	24,145	37.73%	▲12.71
BJP	Kale Gulabrao Laxmanrao	3,077	4.81%	New
RPI(K)	Damodhar Hariba Bavaskar	919	1.44%	New
JP	Shaik M. Taher Haji Shaikh Lal	774	1.21%	New
Independent	Pandurang Chhaju	773	1.21%	New
Independent	Katkar Vithal Mahipat	547	0.85%	New
Independent	A. Gafoora S. Ameer	462	0.72%	New
Margin of victory		9,148	14.30%	▲10.86
Turnout		66,192	64.56%	▼2.85
Total valid votes		63,990		
Registered electors		102,528		▲8.33
INC(U) gain from JP		Swing	▲17.02	

=== Assembly Election 1978 ===
1978 Maharashtra Legislative Assembly election : Sillod
Party	Candidate	Votes	%	±%
JP	Gadekar Namdeo Balwantrao	21,436	35.01%	New
INC	Manikrao Palodkar Sandu	19,327	31.56%	▼37.32
INC(I)	Dwarkadas Yeshwanrtrao	15,319	25.02%	New
Independent	Wagh Rangnath Maroti	3,138	5.12%	New
Independent	Syed Karimoddin Syed Nasiroddin	2,010	3.28%	New
Margin of victory		2,109	3.44%	▼52.59
Turnout		63,800	67.41%	▲25.87
Total valid votes		61,230		
Registered electors		94,641		▼0.68
JP gain from INC		Swing	▼33.87	

=== Assembly Election 1972 ===
1972 Maharashtra Legislative Assembly election : Sillod
Party	Candidate	Votes	%	±%
INC	Shivram Gangaram Mankar	25,868	68.88%	▲13.23
SSP	Manohar Hari	4,824	12.84%	New
Independent	Kunjilal Bhaulal	3,903	10.39%	New
Independent	Vithalrao Katkar	2,962	7.89%	New
Margin of victory		21,044	56.03%	▲31.55
Turnout		39,584	41.54%	▼9.46
Total valid votes		37,557		
Registered electors		95,290		▲16.07
INC hold		Swing	▲13.23	

=== Assembly Election 1967 ===
1967 Maharashtra Legislative Assembly election : Sillod
Party	Candidate	Votes	%	±%
INC	Shivram Gangaram Mankar	21,101	55.65%	▼12.11
SWA	S. R. Patil	11,818	31.17%	New
Independent	M. D. Nalawade	4,995	13.17%	New
Margin of victory		9,283	24.48%	▼19.48
Turnout		41,874	51.00%	▲0.53
Total valid votes		37,914		
Registered electors		82,098		▼0.17
INC hold		Swing	▼12.11	

=== Assembly Election 1962 ===
1962 Maharashtra Legislative Assembly election : Sillod
Party	Candidate	Votes	%	±%
INC	Baburao Janglu	26,171	67.76%	▲7.88
CPI	Karuna Chandragupta	9,191	23.80%	New
PSP	Bansilal Motilal Ladda	3,261	8.44%	▼21.26
Margin of victory		16,980	43.96%	▲13.78
Turnout		41,504	50.47%	▲19.34
Total valid votes		38,623		
Registered electors		82,237		▲21.69
INC hold		Swing	▲7.88	

=== Assembly Election 1957 ===
1957 Bombay State Legislative Assembly election : Sillod
Party	Candidate	Votes	%	±%
INC	Nago Rao	12,598	59.88%	▲9.93
PSP	Motigir	6,249	29.70%	New
Independent	Digumber	2,192	10.42%	New
Margin of victory		6,349	30.18%	▲4.74
Turnout		21,039	31.13%	▼5.12
Total valid votes		21,039		
Registered electors		67,579		▲39.60
INC hold		Swing	▲9.93	

=== Assembly Election 1952 ===
1952 Hyderabad State Legislative Assembly election : Sillod
Party	Candidate	Votes	%	±%
INC	Nago Rao	8,766	49.95%	New
PDF	Kashinath Rao	4,301	24.51%	New
Socialist	Bhikaji Dagdu	3,150	17.95%	New
Independent	Narayan Ganpath	1,332	7.59%	New
Margin of victory		4,465	25.44%	
Turnout		17,549	36.25%	
Total valid votes		17,549		
Registered electors		48,409		
INC win (new seat)				
