= Malegaon Outer Assembly constituency =

Constituency of the Maharashtra legislative assembly in India

Coordinates: 20.53°N 74.50°E

Malegaon Outer
- Constituency No. 115 for the Maharashtra Legislative Assembly

Constituency details
- Country: India
- Region: Western India
- State: Maharashtra
- District: Nashik
- Lok Sabha constituency: Dhule
- Established: 2008 (as Malegaon Outer)
- Total electors: 381,259
- Reservation: None

Member of Legislative Assembly
- 15th Maharashtra Legislative Assembly
- Incumbent Dadaji Bhuse
- Party: SHS
- Alliance: NDA
- Elected year: 2024

Malegaon Outer Assembly constituency is one of the 288 Vidhan Sabha (legislative assembly) constituencies of Maharashtra state in western India.

Before the delimitation of Vidhan Sabha constituencies in 2008, Dabhadi (74) was a constituency of the Maharashtra Legislative Assembly between 1977-2004. The Malegaon Outer (115) constituency belongs to Dhule parliamentary constituency.

== Members of the Legislative Assembly ==
Year	Member	Party
2009	Dadaji Bhuse	Shiv Sena
2014	Dadaji Bhuse	Shiv Sena
2019	Dadaji Bhuse	Shiv Sena
2024	Dadaji Bhuse	Shiv Sena

== Election results ==
=== Assembly Election 2024 ===
2024 Maharashtra Legislative Assembly election : Malegaon Outer
Party	Candidate	Votes	%	±%
SS	Dadaji Bhuse	158,284	61.49%	▲1.46
Independent	Pramod Bandukaka Purushottam Bachhav	51,678	20.08%	New
SS(UBT)	Advay (Aaba) Prashant Hiray	39,843	15.48%	New
NOTA	None of the Above	1,539	0.60%	▼0.14
Margin of victory		106,606	41.41%	▲17.81
Turnout		258,950	67.92%	▲8.39
Total valid votes		257,411		
Registered electors		381,259		▲11.60
SS hold		Swing	▲1.46	

=== Assembly Election 2019 ===
2019 Maharashtra Legislative Assembly election : Malegaon Outer
Party	Candidate	Votes	%	±%
SS	Dadaji Bhuse	121,252	60.03%	▲14.34
INC	Dr.Tushar Ramkrushna Shewale	73,568	36.42%	▲33.89
BSP	Anand Laxman Adhhav	2,568	1.27%	▼0.23
NOTA	None of the Above	1,485	0.74%	▲0.04
Margin of victory		47,684	23.61%	▲2.78
Turnout		203,930	59.70%	▼0.64
Total valid votes		201,983		
Registered electors		341,615		▲13.64
SS hold		Swing	▲14.34	

=== Assembly Election 2014 ===
2014 Maharashtra Legislative Assembly election : Malegaon Outer
Party	Candidate	Votes	%	±%
SS	Dadaji Bhuse	82,093	45.69%	▼7.05
BJP	Thakre Pawan Yashvant	44,672	24.87%	New
NCP	Gaikwad Sunil (Aaba) Babulal	34,117	18.99%	▼17.09
MNS	Sandeep (Bapu) Santosh Patil	8,561	4.77%	▲2.68
INC	Dr. Rajendra Rajaram Thakre	4,551	2.53%	New
BSP	Kachave Vyankant Ramchandra	2,702	1.50%	▲0.47
NOTA	None of the Above	1,254	0.70%	New
Independent	Kailas Maharu Pawar	1,160	0.65%	New
Margin of victory		37,421	20.83%	▲4.16
Turnout		180,979	60.20%	▼1.63
Total valid votes		179,656		
Registered electors		300,611		▲2.33
SS hold		Swing	▼7.05	

=== Assembly Election 2009 ===
2009 Maharashtra Legislative Assembly election : Malegaon Outer
Party	Candidate	Votes	%	±%
SS	Dadaji Bhuse	95,137	52.75%	New
NCP	Hiray Prashant Vyankatrao	65,073	36.08%	New
Independent	Ujwal (Balasaheb) Raghunath Bagul	4,132	2.29%	New
MNS	Nikam Suresh Ramrao	3,769	2.09%	New
Independent	Yavar Ali Sharaf Ali	2,019	1.12%	New
BSP	More Rajesh Mangu	1,871	1.04%	New
Independent	Vaishali Dnyaneshwar More	1,615	0.90%	New
Margin of victory		30,064	16.67%	
Turnout		180,365	61.40%	
Total valid votes		180,363		
Registered electors		293,759		
SS win (new seat)				

== See also ==
- Malegaon Central Assembly constituency
- Malegaon (Lok Sabha constituency)
- List of constituencies of Maharashtra Vidhan Sabha
- Legislative Assembly of Maharashtra
- Dhule (Lok Sabha constituency)
- List of constituencies of the Lok Sabha
- Malegaon
- Dabhadi
