= Dabhadi, Malegaon =

Dabhadi
- Town
- Location in Maharashtra, India
- Coordinates: 20.5567775°N 74.4691086°E
- Country: India
- State: Maharashtra
- District: Nashik

Languages
  - Official: Marathi
- Time zone: UTC+5:30 (IST)
- PIN: 423201
- Website: http://www.dabhadi.com

Dabhadi is a small town in Malegaon taluka of Nashik district in the Indian state of Maharashtra. It is located on Maharashtra State Highway 19 between the towns of Malegaon and Satana.

Before the delimitation of Vidhan Sabha constituencies in 2008, Dabhadi was the constituency number 74 of Maharashtra Legislative Assembly between 1977 and 2004.

Dabhadi

Dabhadi
- Village
- Location in Maharashtra, India
- Country: India
- State: Maharashtra
- District: Nashik
- Taluka: Malegaon

Languages
  - Official: Marathi
- Time zone: UTC+5:30 (IST)
- Vehicle registration: MH

Dabhadi is a village located in the Malegaon taluka of Nashik district in the state of Maharashtra, India. The village is situated near the banks of the Girna River and has historical roots that trace back to early medieval times. History Early history The history of Dabhadi village dates back nearly 1,000 years. During the 10th century, the region was ruled by the Rashtrakuta dynasty. The area around present-day Malegaon and its surrounding settlements formed part of their territory. Copper-plate inscriptions from the period mention that the region between the Girna River and the Mosam River was fertile and prosperous. According to these inscriptions, the Rashtrakuta ruler Dantidurga donated the revenue of several villages—including Mahuligram (present-day Malegaon), Nilgram (Nilgavhan), Vatner (Vadner), and Pimpalvaddha (Pimpalgaon)—to a Jain religious community for charitable purposes. This record indicates the agricultural prosperity of the region at that time. Around the same period, a small settlement of farmers from the Mali community existed about 6 km west of Mahuligram along the banks of the Girna River. These farmers cultivated vegetables, garlic, and other crops. The residents constructed a temple dedicated to Hanuman, and the settlement came to be known as Devwadi, meaning “the settlement near the deity”. Origin of the name Rokdoba The Hanuman temple in Devwadi later became popularly known as Rokdoba. Merchants from Malegaon reportedly gathered at the temple platform to settle payments with local farmers for agricultural produce. Because cash transactions frequently took place there, the temple deity came to be locally referred to as Rokdoba. Over time, the name became commonly associated with the temple. Relocation of the settlement After the 11th century, the region experienced political changes and conflicts during the rule of several Muslim dynasties in the Deccan. The original settlement of Devwadi was located close to the Girna River and frequently faced the threat of floods. Due to these difficulties and the limited space for expansion, the inhabitants gradually relocated about 3 km east to the banks of the Dhodhyad River. Although the settlement shifted location, the Rokdoba Hanuman temple remained at its original site near the Girna River. Maratha period In 1761, the Maratha ruler Balaji Baji Rao extended patronage to Devwadi and granted the jagir of the village to the noble family of Vinchurkar. During this period, several structures were constructed in the village, including a dharamshala (rest house), a brick mansion, and a stepped well. Local accounts mention that the stepped well had an underground passage believed to lead toward the direction of the Malegaon Fort (Bhuikot Fort). Historical records indicate that the fort itself was constructed around 1765, suggesting that these structures belonged to the same period. Most of these old structures are no longer present today. Etymology The village was originally known as Devwadi. Over time, linguistic influences led to changes in pronunciation. In the Ahirani dialect, the name became Dawadi, while Urdu-speaking residents of Malegaon pronounced it as Dabadi. Gradually, the name evolved into its present form: Devwadi → Dawadi → Dabadi → Dabhadi Even today, some Ahirani speakers continue to pronounce the village name as Dawadi. Traditional landholding families The traditional landholding (Mulvatanadar) families of Dabhadi belong to the Mali community with the surnames Jire and Navare. Nikam family Historical accounts also mention the presence of the Nikam family in the village. According to local traditions, the family traces its lineage to descendants associated with the period of Shivaji. Some members of this lineage are believed to have earlier settled in Chandwad before later migrating to Dabhadi. See also Malegaon Nashik district Girna River References Study of Economic and Social Development of Dabhadi Village (1976–1986). Regional historical references on the Rashtrakuta dynasty and copper-plate inscriptions of the Deccan.
