= Shankarrao Gadakh =

Indian politician

Shankarrao Gadakh Patil

Cabinet Minister Government of Maharashtra
- In office 30 December 2019 – 29 June 2022
- Minister: Soil and Water Conservation; Agriculture Additional charge on 27th June 2022; Ex. Servicemen Welfare Additional charge on 27th June 2022; Employment Guarantee. Additional charge on 27th June 2022; Horticulture. Additional charge on 27th June 2022
- Governor: Bhagat Singh Koshyari
- Chief Minister: Uddhav Thackeray
- Deputy CM: Ajit Pawar

Guardian Minister, Osmanabad District
- In office 9 January 2020 – 29 June 2022

Member of Legislative Assembly of Maharashtra
- Incumbent
- Assumed office 2019
- Constituency: Nevasa

Personal details
- Party: Shiv Sena
- Parent: Yashwantrao Gadakh Patil (father)
- Occupation: Politician

Shankarrao Yashwantrao Gadakh Patil (born 29 May 1970 in the village of Sonai, Maharashtra, India) is Member of Maharashtra Legislative Assembly from Nevasa. Gadakh had wrested the Nevasa seat from the BJP in the 2019 assembly polls by defeating BJP candidate with a convincing margin. He is member of the Shiv Sena and former minister of Soil and Water Conservation in Government of Maharashtra.

Having entered politics in 1995 at the age of 25, Gadakh began as a Youth Congress campaigner. In 2017 he founded the party Krantikari Shetkari Party and fought local elections. Krantikari Paksha now has 5 Ahmednagar Zilla Parishad members, 12 Nevasa Panchayat Samiti members and 9 Nagarsevaks in Nevasa. He is also known as "Panidar Aamdar" by his constituency for his good work during drought like conditions in Nevasa constituency.

On 11 August 2020 he dissolved Krantikari Shetkari Paksha and joined Shiv Sena.

== Positions held ==
- 2009: Elected to Maharashtra Legislative Assembly
- 2019: Elected to Maharashtra Legislative Assembly
- 2019: Appointed minister of Soil and Water Conservation in the Government of Maharashtra
- 2020: Appointed guardian minister of Osmanabad district

== See also ==
Uddhav Thackeray ministry
