= Nevasa Assembly constituency =

Constituency of the Maharashtra legislative assembly in India

Coordinates: 19.55°N 74.93°E

Nevasa
- Constituency No. 221 for the Maharashtra Legislative Assembly

Constituency details
- Country: India
- Region: Western India
- State: Maharashtra
- District: Ahmednagar
- Lok Sabha constituency: Shirdi
- Established: 2008
- Total electors: 283,489
- Reservation: None

Member of Legislative Assembly
- 15th Maharashtra Legislative Assembly
- Incumbent Vitthal Langhe Patil
- Party: SHS
- Alliance: NDA
- Elected year: 2024

Nevasa Assembly constituency is one of the 288 Vidhan Sabha (Legislative Assembly) constituencies of Maharashtra state in Western India. The MLA elected in 2009 was Shankarrao Gadakh.

== Overview ==
Nevasa (constituency number 221) is one of the twelve Vidhan Sabha constituencies located in Ahmednagar district. It covers the entire Nevasa tehsil of the district.

Nevasa is part of Shirdi Lok Sabha constituency along with five other Vidhan Sabha segments in this district, namely Sangamner, Shirdi, Kopargaon, Shrirampur and Akole.

== Members of Legislative Assembly ==
| Year | Member | Party |
|---|---|---|
Before 2009 : Constituency did not exist
| 2009 | Shankarrao Gadakh Patil | Nationalist Congress Party |
| 2014 | Balasaheb Alias Dadasaheb Damodhar Murkute | Bharatiya Janata Party |
| 2019 | Shankarrao Gadakh Patil | Krantikari Shetkari Party |
| 2024 | Vitthal Langhe Patil | Shiv Sena |

== Election results ==
=== Assembly Election 2024 ===
2024 Maharashtra Legislative Assembly election : Nevasa
| Party | Candidate | Votes | % | ±% |
|---|---|---|---|---|
| SS | Vitthal Langhe | 95,444 | 42.23% | New |
| SS(UBT) | Shankarrao Yashwantrao Gadakh Patil | 91,423 | 40.45% | New |
| PHJSP | Balasaheb Alias Dadasaheb Damodhar Murkute | 35,331 | 15.63% | New |
| NOTA | None of the Above | 1,723 | 0.76% | ▲0.61 |
| Margin of victory | | 4,021 | 1.78% | ▼12.73 |
| Turnout | | 227,728 | 80.33% | ▼0.56 |
| Total valid votes | | 226,005 | | |
| Registered electors | | 283,489 | | ▲7.73 |
| SS gain from Krantikari Shetkari Party | | Swing | ▼13.12 | |

=== Assembly Election 2019 ===
2019 Maharashtra Legislative Assembly election : Nevasa
| Party | Candidate | Votes | % | ±% |
|---|---|---|---|---|
| Krantikari Shetkari Party | Shankarrao Yashwantrao Gadakh Patil | 116,943 | 55.35% | New |
| BJP | Balasaheb Alias Dadasaheb Damodhar Murkute | 86,280 | 40.84% | ▼7.04 |
| API | Karbhari Vishnu Udage | 2,046 | 0.97% | New |
| NOTA | None of the Above | 316 | 0.15% | ▼0.75 |
| Margin of victory | | 30,663 | 14.51% | ▲11.88 |
| Turnout | | 211,765 | 80.47% | ▲6.44 |
| Total valid votes | | 211,266 | | |
| Registered electors | | 263,158 | | ▲10.02 |
| Krantikari Shetkari Party gain from BJP | | Swing | ▲7.47 | |

=== Assembly Election 2014 ===
2014 Maharashtra Legislative Assembly election : Nevasa
| Party | Candidate | Votes | % | ±% |
|---|---|---|---|---|
| BJP | Balasaheb Alias Dadasaheb Damodhar Murkute | 84,570 | 47.88% | ▲6.98 |
| NCP | Shankarrao Yashwantrao Gadakh Patil | 79,911 | 45.24% | ▼8.22 |
| SS | Sahebrao Haribhau Ghadge Patil | 4,766 | 2.70% | New |
| INC | Dilip Vitthal Wakchaure | 2,139 | 1.21% | New |
| MNS | Mote Dilip Uttamrao | 1,654 | 0.94% | New |
| NOTA | None of the Above | 1,590 | 0.90% | New |
| Independent | Ajit Namdev Phatake | 1,563 | 0.88% | New |
| Margin of victory | | 4,659 | 2.64% | ▼9.93 |
| Turnout | | 178,309 | 74.54% | ▼3.05 |
| Total valid votes | | 176,619 | | |
| Registered electors | | 239,201 | | ▲7.55 |
| BJP gain from NCP | | Swing | ▼5.58 | |

=== Assembly Election 2009 ===
2009 Maharashtra Legislative Assembly election : Nevasa
| Party | Candidate | Votes | % | ±% |
|---|---|---|---|---|
| NCP | Shankarrao Yashwantrao Gadakh Patil | 91,429 | 53.47% | New |
| BJP | Vitthal Wakilrao Langhe Patil | 69,943 | 40.90% | New |
| Independent | Tukaram Gangadhar Gadakh Patil | 5,166 | 3.02% | New |
| Independent | Pehere Rambhau Kacharu | 1,502 | 0.88% | New |
| Margin of victory | | 21,486 | 12.56% | |
| Turnout | | 171,078 | 76.92% | |
| Total valid votes | | 171,003 | | |
| Registered electors | | 222,401 | | |
| NCP win (new seat) | | | | |

== See also ==
- Nevasa
- List of constituencies of the Maharashtra Legislative Assembly
