= Ministry of Tourism (Maharashtra) =

Government ministry of Maharashtra, India

Ministry of Tourism Department Government of Maharashtra
- मंत्रालय पर्यटन विभाग, महाराष्ट्र शासन
- Seal of the state of Maharashtra

- Building of Administrative Headquarters of Mumbai

Ministry overview
- Jurisdiction: (India) Maharashtra
- Headquarters: Mantralay, Mumbai
- Minister responsible: Shambhuraj Desai, Cabinet Minister
- Deputy Minister responsible: Indranil Naik, Minister of State
- Ministry executive: Mr. Valsa Nair Singh, Principal Secretary
- Parent department: Government of Maharashtra
- Website: www.maharashtratourism.gov.in

The Ministry of tourism is a ministry in the Government of Maharashtra. The Ministry is responsible for promotion of travel and tourism in Maharashtra.

The Ministry is headed by the Cabinet level Minister. Shambhuraj Desai is current Minister of Tourism since December 2024.

== Tourism in Maharashtra ==
Maharashtra attracts drug tourists from different states and foreign countries. It was the second most visited Indian state by foreigners and fourth most visited state by domestic tourists in the country in 2014. Aurangabad is the tourism capital of Maharashtra.

== Head office ==
Minister of Tourism मंत्री पर्यटन
- Emblem of India

- Flag of India
- Incumbent; Shambhuraj Desai since 21 December 2024
- Ministry of Tourism
- Style: The Honourable
- Abbreviation: Cabinet Minister
- Member of: State Cabinet
- Reports to: Chief Minister, Maharashtra Legislature
- Seat: Mantralaya, Mumbai
- Appointer: Governor on the advice of the Chief Minister
- Term length: 5 years
- Precursor: Devendra Fadnavis (2024-2024)
- Inaugural holder: Homi J. H. Taleyarkhan (1960-1962)
- Formation: 1 May 1960
- Deputy: Indranil Naik

== Cabinet Ministers ==
No.	Portrait	Minister (Constituency)	Term of office			Political party	Ministry	Chief Minister
No.	Portrait	Minister (Constituency)	From	To	Period	Political party	Ministry	Chief Minister
Minister of Tourism
01		Homi J. H. Taleyarkhan (MLC for Elected by MLAs Constituency No. 22 - Mumbai Suburban District) (Legislative Council)	01 May 1960	07 March 1962	1 year, 310 days	Indian National Congress	Yashwantrao I	Yashwantrao Chavan
02		Homi J. H. Taleyarkhan (MLC for Elected by MLAs Constituency No. 22 - Mumbai Suburban District) (Legislative Council)	08 March 1962	19 November 1962	256 days	Indian National Congress	Yashwantrao II	Yashwantrao Chavan
03		Homi J. H. Taleyarkhan (MLC for Elected by MLAs Constituency No. 22 - Mumbai Suburban District) (Legislative Council)	20 November 1962	24 November 1963	1 year, 4 days	Indian National Congress	Kannamwar l	Marotrao Kannamwar
04		P. K. Sawant (MLA for Chiplun Constituency No. 265- Ratnagiri District) (Legislative Assembly) (Interim Chief Minister)	25 November 1962	04 December 1963	9 days	Indian National Congress	Sawant	P. K. Sawant
05		Homi J. H. Taleyarkhan (MLC for Elected by MLAs Constituency No. 22 - Mumbai Suburban District) (Legislative Council)	05 December 1963	01 March 1967	3 years, 86 days	Indian National Congress	Vasantrao I	Vasantrao Naik
06		Balasaheb Desai (MLA for Patan Constituency No. 261- Satara District) (Legislative Assembly)	01 March 1967	27 October 1969	2 years, 240 days	Indian National Congress	Vasantrao II	Vasantrao Naik
07		P. K. Sawant (MLA for Chiplun Constituency No. 265- Ratnagiri District) (Legislative Assembly)	27 October 1969	13 March 1972	2 years, 138 days	Indian National Congress	Vasantrao II	Vasantrao Naik
08		Vasantrao Naik (MLA for Patan Constituency No. 261- Satara District) (Legislative Assembly) (Chief Minister)	13 March 1972	04 April 1973	1 year, 32 days	Indian National Congress	Vasantrao III	Vasantrao Naik
09		Yashwantrao Mohite (MLA for Karad South Constituency No. 260- Satara District) (Legislative Assembly)	04 April 1973	17 Match; 1974	347 days	Indian National Congress	Vasantrao III	Vasantrao Naik
10		Vasantrao Patil (MLC for Elected by MLAs Constituency No. 20 - Sangli District) (Legislative Council)	17 Match; 1974	21 February 1975	341 days	Indian National Congress	Vasantrao III	Vasantrao Naik
11		Shankarrao Chavan (MLA for Bhokar Constituency No. 85- Nanded District) (Legislative Assembly) (Chief Minister)	21 February 1975	05 May 1976	2 years, 54 days	Indian National Congress	Shankarrao I	Shankarrao Chavan
12		Rafiq Zakaria (MLC for Elected by MLAs Constituency No. 16 - Mumbai Suburban District) (Legislative Council)	05 May 1976	16 April 1977	346 days	Indian National Congress	Shankarrao I	Shankarrao Chavan
13		Nashikrao Tirpude (MLA for Bhandara Constituency No. 61- Bhandara District) (Legislative Assembly)	17 April 1977	07 March 1978	1 year, 324 days	Indian National Congress	Vasantdada I	Vasantdada Patil
14		Prabha Rau (MLA for Pulgaon Constituency No. 41- Wardha District) (Legislative Assembly)	07 March 1978	18 July 1978	133 days	Indian National Congress (Indira)	Vasantdada II	Vasantdada Patil
15		Sushilkumar Shinde (MLA for Solapur City Central Constituency No. 249- Solapur District) (Legislative Assembly)	18 July 1978	17 February 1980	1 year, 214 days	Indian Congress (Socialist)	Pawar I	Sharad Pawar
16		Jayant Shridhar Tilak (MLC for Elected by MLAs Constituency No. 02 - Pune District) (Legislative Council)	09 June 1980	21 January 1982	1 year, 226 days	Indian National Congress	Antulay	Abdul Rahman Antulay
17		Baliram Waman Hiray (MLA for Dabhadi Constituency No. 74- Nashik District) (Legislative Assembly)	21 January 1982	02 February 1983	1 year, 12 days	Indian National Congress	Bhosale	Babasaheb Bhosale
18		Sushilkumar Shinde (MLA for Solapur City Central Constituency No. 249- Solapur District) (Legislative Assembly)	07 February 1983	05 March 1985	2 years, 26 days	Indian National Congress	Vasantdada III	Vasantdada Patil
19		Jawaharlal Darda (MLC for Elected by MLAs Constituency No. 19 - Yavatmal District) (Legislative Council)	12 March 1985	03 June 1985	83 days	Indian National Congress	Vasantdada IV	Vasantdada Patil
19		Jawaharlal Darda (MLC for Elected by MLAs Constituency No. 19 - Yavatmal District) (Legislative Council)	03 June 1985	12 March 1986	282 days	Indian National Congress	Nilangekar	Shivajirao Patil Nilangekar
20		Ram Meghe (MLA for Daryapur Constituency No. 40- Amravati District) (Legislative Assembly)	12 March 1986	26 June 1988	2 years, 106 days	Indian National Congress	Shankarrao II	Shankarrao Chavan
21		Vilasrao Deshmukh (MLA for Latur City Constituency No. 235- Latur District) (Legislative Assembly)	26 June 1988	03 March 1990	1 year, 250 days	Indian National Congress	Pawar II	Sharad Pawar
22		Vilasrao Deshmukh (MLA for Latur City Constituency No. 235- Latur District) (Legislative Assembly)	03 March 1990	25 January 1991	328 days	Indian National Congress	Pawar III	Sharad Pawar
23		Anantrao Thopate (MLA for Bhor Constituency No. 203- Pune District) (Legislative Assembly)	25 January 1991	25 June 1991	151 days		Pawar III	Sharad Pawar
24		Sudhakarrao Naik (MLA for Pusad Constituency No. 81- Yavatmal District) (Legislative Assembly) (Chief Minister)	25 June 1991	30 December 1991	188 days	Indian National Congress	Sudhakarrao	Sudhakarrao Naik
25		Vijaysinh Mohite-Patil (MLA for Malshiras Constituency No. 254- Solapur District) (Legislative Assembly)	30 December 1991	22 February 1993	1 year, 54 days		Sudhakarrao	Sudhakarrao Naik
26		Prabhakar Dharkar (MLC for Elected by MLAs Constituency No. 16 - Pune District) (Legislative Council)	06 March 1993	18 November 1994	1 year, 257 days	Indian National Congress	Pawar IV	Sharad Pawar
27		Vilasrao Deshmukh (MLA for Latur City Constituency No. 235- Latur District) (Legislative Assembly)	18 November 1994	14 March 1995	116 days	Indian National Congress	Pawar IV	Sharad Pawar
28		Jagannath Patil (MLA for Kalyan Constituency No. 145- Thane District) (Legislative Assembly)	14 March 1995	01 February 1999	3 years, 324 days	Shiv Sena	Joshi	Manohar Joshi
29		Pramod Navalkar (MLC for Mumbai Graduates Constituency No. 06 - Mumbai City District) (Legislative Council)	01 February 1999	11 May 1999	99 days	Shiv Sena	Rane	Narayan Rane
30		Eknath Khadse (MLA for Muktainagar Constituency No. 20- Jalgaon District) (Legislative Assembly)	11 May 1999	17 October 1999	159 days	Bharatiya Janata Party	Rane	Narayan Rane
38		Ganpatrao Deshmukh (MLA for Sangola Constituency No. 235- Solapur District (Legislative Assembly)	19 October 1999	16 January 2003	3 years, 89 days	Peasants and Workers Party of India	Deshmukh I	Vilasrao Deshmukh
32		Shivajirao Moghe (MLA for Arni Constituency No. 80- Yavatmal District) (Legislative Assembly)	18 January 2003	01 November 2004	1 year, 295 days	Indian National Congress	Sushilkumar	Sushilkumar Shinde
33		R. R. Patil (MLA for Tasgaon-Kavathe Mahankal Constituency No. 287- Sangli District) (Legislative Assembly) (Deputy Chief Minister)	01 November 2004	09 November 2004	8 days	Nationalist Congress Party	Deshmukh II	Vilasrao Deshmukh
34		Vijaysinh Mohite-Patil (MLA for Malshiras Constituency No. 254- Solapur District) (Legislative Assembly)	09 November 2004	01 December 2008	4 years, 22 days	Nationalist Congress Party	Deshmukh II	Vilasrao Deshmukh
35		Chhagan Bhujbal (MLA for Yevla Constituency No. 119- Nashik District) (Legislative Assembly) (Deputy Chief Minister)	08 December 2008	06 November 2009	333 days	Nationalist Congress Party	Ashok I	Ashok Chavan
36		Vijaykumar Gavit (MLA for Nandurbar Constituency No. 03- Nandurbar District) (Legislative Assembly)	07 November 2009	10 November 2010	1 year, 3 days	Nationalist Congress Party	Ashok II	Ashok Chavan
37		Chhagan Bhujbal (MLA for Yevla Constituency No. 119- Nashik District) (Legislative Assembly)	11 November 2010	26 September 2014	3 years, 319 days	Nationalist Congress Party	Prithviraj	Prithviraj Chavan
39		Devendra Fadnavis (MLA for Nagpur South West Constituency No. 52- Nagpur District) (Legislative Assembly) (Chief Minister)	31 October 2014	04 June 2016	1 year, 217 days	Bharatiya Janata Party	Fadnavis I	Devendra Fadnavis
40		Pankaja Munde (MLA for Parli Constituency No. 233- Beed District) (Legislative Assembly)	04 June 2016	08 July 2016	34 days	Bharatiya Janata Party	Fadnavis I	Devendra Fadnavis
42		Jayakumar Jitendrasinh Rawal (MLA for Sindkheda Constituency No. 06- Dhule District) (Legislative Assembly)	08 July 2016	12 November 2019	3 years, 127 days	Bharatiya Janata Party	Fadnavis I	Devendra Fadnavis
43		Devendra Fadnavis (MLA for Nagpur South West Constituency No. 52- Nagpur District) (Legislative Assembly) (Chief_Minister); In Charge	23 November 2019	28 November 2019	5 days	Bharatiya Janata Party	Fadnavis II	Devendra Fadnavis
44		Eknath Shinde (MLA for Kopri-Pachpakhadi Constituency No. 147- Thane District) (Legislative Assembly)	28 November 2019	30 December 2019	32 days	Shiv Sena	Thackeray	Uddhav Thackeray
45		Aaditya Thackeray (MLA for Worli Constituency No. 182- Mumbai City District (Legislative Assembly)	30 December 2019	29 June 2022	2 years, 181 days	Shiv Sena	Thackeray	Uddhav Thackeray
46		Eknath Shinde (MLA for Kopri-Pachpakhadi Constituency No. 147- Thane District) (Legislative Assembly) (Chief Minister); In Charge	30 June 2022	14 August 2022	45 days	Shiv Sena (2022–present)	Eknath	Eknath Shinde
47		Mangal Lodha (MLA for Malabar Hill Constituency No. 185- Mumbai City District) (Legislative Assembly)	14 August 2022	14 July 2023	334 days	Bharatiya Janata Party	Eknath	Eknath Shinde
48		Girish Mahajan (MLA for Jamner Constituency No. 19- Jalgaon District) (Legislative Assembly)	14 July 2023	26 November 2024	1 year, 135 days	Bharatiya Janata Party	Eknath	Eknath Shinde
49		Devendra Fadnavis (MLA for Nagpur South West Constituency No. 52- Nagpur District) (Legislative Assembly) (Chief_Minister); In Charge	05 December 2024	21 December 2024	16 days	Bharatiya Janata Party	Fadnavis III	Devendra Fadnavis
50		Shambhuraj Desai (MLA for Patan Constituency No. 261- Satara District) (Legislative Assembly)	21 December 2024	Incumbent	1 year, 261 days	Shiv Sena (Shinde Group)	Fadnavis III	Devendra Fadnavis

== Ministers of State ==
No.	Portrait	Deputy Minister (Constituency)	Term of office			Political party	Ministry	Minister	Chief Minister
No.	Portrait	Deputy Minister (Constituency)	From	To	Period	Political party	Ministry	Minister	Chief Minister
Deputy Minister of Tourism
Vacant			23 November 2019	28 November 2019	5 days	NA	Fadnavis II	Devendra Fadnavis	Devendra Fadnavis
01		Aditi Tatkare (MLA for Shrivardhan Constituency No. 193- Raigad District) (Legislative Assembly)	30 December 2019	29 June 2022	2 years, 181 days	Nationalist Congress Party	Thackeray	Aaditya Thackeray	Uddhav Thackeray
Vacant			30 June 2022	26 November 2024	2 years, 149 days	NA	Eknath	Eknath Shinde (2022 - 2022); Mangal Lodha (2022 - 2023); Girish Mahajan (2023–2024)	Eknath Shinde
02		Indranil Naik (MLA for Pusad Constituency No. 81- Yavatmal District) (Legislative Assembly)	21 December 2024	Incumbent	1 year, 261 days	Nationalist Congress Party (Ajit Pawar Group)	Fadnavis III	Shambhuraj Desai (2024–Present)	Devendra Fadnavis

== List of principal secretary ==
- Mr. Valsa Nair Singh IAS

== MTDC ==
Ministry has separate wing which looks after tourism development. Maharashtra Tourism Development Corporation commonly abbreviated as MTDC, is a body of the Ministry of Tourism responsible for development of tourism in the Indian state of Maharashtra. It has been established under the Companies Act, 1956, (fully owned by Govt. of Maharashtra) for systematic development of tourism on commercial lines, with an authorized share capital of Rs. 25 crore. The paid up share capital of the corporation as on 31 March 2013 is Rs. 1538.88 lakhs.

== See also ==
- Ministry of General Administration (Maharashtra)
- Ministry of Information and Public Relations (Maharashtra)
- Ministry of Information Technology (Maharashtra)
- Ministry of Law and Judiciary (Maharashtra)
- Ministry of Home Affairs (Maharashtra)
- Ministry of Public Works (Excluding Public Undertakings) (Maharashtra)
- Ministry of Public Works (Including Public Undertakings) (Maharashtra)
- Ministry of Finance (Maharashtra)
- Ministry of Planning (Maharashtra)
- Ministry of Revenue (Maharashtra)
- Ministry of State Excise (Maharashtra)
- Ministry of Special Assistance (Maharashtra)
- Ministry of Social Justice (Maharashtra)
- Ministry of Forests Department (Maharashtra)
- Ministry of Environment and Climate Change (Maharashtra)
- Ministry of Energy (Maharashtra)
- Ministry of Water Resources (Maharashtra)
- Ministry of Command Area Development (Maharashtra)
- Ministry of Public Health (Maharashtra)
- Ministry of Housing (Maharashtra)
- Ministry of Urban Development (Maharashtra)
- Ministry of Rural Development (Maharashtra)
- Ministry of Labour (Maharashtra)
- Ministry of Co-operation (Maharashtra)
- Ministry of Marketing (Maharashtra)
- Ministry of Transport (Maharashtra)
- Ministry of Industries (Maharashtra)
- Ministry of Mining Department (Maharashtra)
- Ministry of Textiles (Maharashtra)
- Ministry of Protocol (Maharashtra)
- Ministry of Tourism (Maharashtra)
- Ministry of Cultural Affairs (Maharashtra)
- Ministry of Marathi Language (Maharashtra)
- Ministry of Water Supply (Maharashtra)
- Ministry of Soil and Water Conservation (Maharashtra)
- Ministry of Parliamentary Affairs (Maharashtra)
- Ministry of Sanitation (Maharashtra)
- Ministry of Woman and Child Development (Maharashtra)
- Ministry of School Education (Maharashtra)
- Ministry of Medical Education (Maharashtra)
- Ministry of Higher and Technical Education (Maharashtra)
- Ministry of Skill Development and Entrepreneurship (Maharashtra)
- Ministry of Sports and Youth Welfare (Maharashtra)
- Ministry of Ex. Servicemen Welfare (Maharashtra)
- Ministry of Agriculture (Maharashtra)
- Ministry of Food, Civil Supplies and Consumer Protection (Maharashtra)
- Ministry of Food and Drug Administration (Maharashtra)
- Ministry of Animal Husbandry Department (Maharashtra)
- Ministry of Dairy Development (Maharashtra)
- Ministry of Horticulture (Maharashtra)
- Ministry of Fisheries Department (Maharashtra)
- Ministry of Ports Development (Maharashtra)
- Ministry of Disaster Management (Maharashtra)
- Ministry of Relief & Rehabilitation (Maharashtra)
- Ministry of Khar Land Development (Maharashtra)
- Ministry of Earthquake Rehabilitation (Maharashtra)
- Ministry of Employment Guarantee (Maharashtra)
- Ministry of Minority Development and Aukaf (Maharashtra)
- Ministry of Majority Welfare Development (Maharashtra)
- Ministry of Tribal Development (Maharashtra)
- Ministry of Vimukta Jati (Maharashtra)
- Ministry of Nomadic Tribes (Maharashtra)
- Ministry of Other Backward Classes (Maharashtra)
- Ministry of Other Backward Bahujan Welfare (Maharashtra)
- Ministry of Special Backward Classes Welfare (Maharashtra)
- Ministry of Socially and Educationally Backward Classes (Maharashtra)
