= Ministry of Planning (Maharashtra) =

Maharashtra government ministry responsible for planning

Ministry of Planning, Government of Maharashtra
- मंत्रालय नियोजन विभाग महाराष्ट्र शासन
- Seal of the state of Maharashtra

- Building of Administrative Headquarters of Mumbai

Ministry overview
- Jurisdiction: (India) Maharashtra
- Headquarters: Mantralay, Mumbai
- Minister responsible: Devendra Fadnavis, Chief Minister And Minister of Planning Additional Charge
- Deputy Minister responsible: Ashish Jaiswal, Minister of State
- Ministry executive: (IAS)
- Parent department: Government of Maharashtra
- Website: plan.maharashtra.gov.in/default.aspx

The Ministry of Planning is a ministry of the Government of Maharashtra. It is responsible for preparing annual plans for the development of Maharashtra state.

The Ministry is headed by a cabinet level Minister. Devendra Fadnavis is Current Chief Minister of Maharashtra And Additional Charge Minister of Planning.

== Head office ==
Minister of Planning नियोजन मंत्री
- Emblem of India

- Flag of India
- Incumbent; Devendra Fadnavis; Chief Minister Additional Charge since 28 January 2026
- Ministry of Planning (Maharashtra)
- Style: The Honourable
- Abbreviation: Cabinet Minister
- Member of: State Cabinet
- Reports to: Chief Minister, & Maharashtra Legislature
- Seat: Mantralaya, Mumbai
- Appointer: Governor on the advice of the Chief Minister
- Term length: 5 years
- Precursor: Ajit Pawar (2024-2026)
- Inaugural holder: Yashwantrao Chavan (1960-1962)
- Formation: 1 May 1960
- Deputy: Ashish Jaiswal

== Cabinet Ministers ==
No.	Portrait	Minister (Constituency)	Term of office			Political party	Ministry	Chief Minister
No.	Portrait	Minister (Constituency)	From	To	Period	Political party	Ministry	Chief Minister
Minister of Planning
01		Yashwantrao Chavan (MLA for Karad North Constituency No. 259- Satara District) (Legislative Assembly) (Chief Minister)	01 May 1960	07 March 1962	1 year, 310 days	Indian National Congress	Yashwantrao I	Yashwantrao Chavan
02		Yashwantrao Chavan (MLA for Karad North Constituency No. 259- Satara District) (Legislative Assembly) (Chief Minister)	08 March 1962	19 November 1962	256 days	Indian National Congress	Yashwantrao II	Yashwantrao Chavan
03		Marotrao Kannamwar (MLA for Saoli Constituency No. 73- Chandrapur District) (Legislative Assembly) (Chief Minister)	20 November 1962	24 November 1963	1 year, 4 days	Indian National Congress	Kannamwar l	Marotrao Kannamwar
04		P. K. Sawant (MLA for Chiplun Constituency No. 265- Ratnagiri District) (Legislative Assembly) (Interim Chief Minister)	25 November 1962	04 December 1963	9 days	Indian National Congress	Sawant I	P. K. Sawant
05		Vasantrao Naik (MLA for Pusad Constituency No. 81- Yavatmal District) (Legislative Assembly) (Chief Minister)	05 December 1963	01 March 1967	3 years, 86 days	Indian National Congress	Vasantrao I	Vasantrao Naik
06		Vasantrao Naik (MLA for Pusad Constituency No. 81- Yavatmal District) (Legislative Assembly) (Chief Minister)	01 March 1967	27 October 1969	2 years, 240 days	Indian National Congress	Vasantrao II	Vasantrao Naik
07		Pratibha Patil (MLA for Jalgaon City Constituency No. 13- Jalgaon District) (Legislative Assembly)	27 October 1969	13 March 1972	2 years, 138 days	Indian National Congress	Vasantrao II	Vasantrao Naik
08		Abdul Rahman Antulay (MLA for Shrivardhan Constituency No. 193- Raigad District) (Legislative Assembly)	13 March 1972	21 February 1975	2 years, 345 days	Indian National Congress	Vasantrao III	Vasantrao Naik
09		Shankarrao Chavan (MLA for Bhokar Constituency No. 85- Nanded District) (Legislative Assembly) (Chief Minister)	21 February 1975	17 May 1977	2 years, 85 days	Indian National Congress	Shankarrao I	Shankarrao Chavan
10		Narendra Mahipati Tidke (MLA for Savner Constituency No. 49- Nagpur District) (Legislative Assembly)	17 May 1977	07 March 1978	1 year, 294 days	Indian National Congress	Vasantdada I	Vasantdada Patil
11		Vasantdada Patil (MLA for Sangli Constituency No. 282- Sangli District) (Legislative Assembly) (Chief Minister)	07 March 1978	18 July 1978	133 days	Indian National Congress (U)	Vasantdada II	Vasantdada Patil
12		Sharad Pawar (MLA for Baramati Constituency No. 201- Pune District) (Legislative Assembly) (Chief Minister)	18 July 1978	17 February 1980	1 year, 214 days	Indian Congress (Socialist)	Pawar I	Sharad Pawar
13		Abdul Rahman Antulay (MLA for Shrivardhan Constituency No. 193- Raigad District) (Legislative Assembly) (Chief Minister)	09 June 1980	21 January 1982	1 year, 226 days	Indian National Congress	Antulay	Abdul Rahman Antulay
14		V. Subramaniam (MLA for South Mumbai Constituency No. 121- Mumbai City District) (Legislative Assembly)	21 January 1982	02 February 1983	1 year, 12 days	Indian National Congress	Bhosale	Babasaheb Bhosale
15		Sushilkumar Shinde (MLA for Solapur City Central Constituency No. 249- Solapur District) (Legislative Assembly)	07 February 1983	05 March 1985	2 years, 26 days	Indian National Congress	Vasantdada III	Vasantdada Patil
16		Sushilkumar Shinde (MLA for Solapur City Central Constituency No. 249- Solapur District) (Legislative Assembly)	12 March 1985; 1960	03 June 1985; 1962	83 days	Indian National Congress	Vasantdada IV	Vasantdada Patil
17		Sushilkumar Shinde (MLA for Solapur City Central Constituency No. 249- Solapur District) (Legislative Assembly)	03 June 1985	12 March 1986	282 days	Indian National Congress	Nilangekar	Shivajirao Patil Nilangekar
18		Sushilkumar Shinde (MLA for Solapur City Central Constituency No. 249- Solapur District) (Legislative Assembly)	12 March 1986	26 June 1988	2 years, 106 days	Indian National Congress	Shankarrao II	Shankarrao Chavan
19		Sushilkumar Shinde (MLA for Solapur City Central Constituency No. 249- Solapur District) (Legislative Assembly)	26 June 1988	03 March 1990	1 year, 250 days	Indian National Congress	Pawar II	Sharad Pawar
20		Ramrao Adik (MLC for Elected by MLAs Constituency No. 05 - Ahmednagar District) (Legislative Council)	04 March 1990	25 June 1991	1 year, 113 days	Indian National Congress	Pawar III	Sharad Pawar
21		Ramrao Adik (MLC for Elected by MLAs Constituency No. 05 - Ahmednagar District) (Legislative Council)	25 June 1991	22 February 1993	1 year, 242 days	Indian National Congress	Sudhakarrao	Sudhakarrao Naik
22		Sharad Pawar (MLA for Baramati Constituency No. 201- Pune District) (Legislative Assembly) (Chief Minister)	06 March 1993	14 March 1995	2 years, 8 days	Indian National Congress	Pawar IV	Sharad Pawar
23		Hashu Advani (MLA for Chembur Constituency No. 173- Mumbai Suburban District) (Legislative Assembly)	14 March 1995	18 September 1995	188 days	Bharatiya Janata Party	Joshi	Manohar Joshi
24		Eknath Khadse (MLA for Muktainagar Constituency No. 20- Jalgaon District) (Legislative Assembly)	18 September 1995	10 June 1997	1 year, 265 days	Bharatiya Janata Party	Joshi	Manohar Joshi
25		Mahadeorao Sukaji Shivankar (MLA for Amgaon Constituency No. 66- Gondia district) (Legislative Assembly)	10 June 1997	31 January 1999	1 year, 235 days	Bharatiya Janata Party	Joshi	Manohar Joshi
26		Eknath Khadse (MLA for Muktainagar Constituency No. 20- Jalgaon District) (Legislative Assembly)	01 February 1999	11 May 1999	99 days	Bharatiya Janata Party	Rane	Narayan Rane
27		Mahadeorao Sukaji Shivankar (MLA for Amgaon Constituency No. 66- Gondia district) (Legislative Assembly)	11 May 1999	17 October 1999	159 days	Bharatiya Janata Party	Rane	Narayan Rane
28		Vilasrao Deshmukh (MLA for Latur City Constituency No. 235- Latur District) (Legislative Assembly) (Chief Minister)	19 October 1999	27 October 1999	8 days	Indian National Congress	Deshmukh I	Vilasrao Deshmukh
29		Jayant Patil (MLA for Walva Constituency No. 283- Sangli District) (Legislative Assembly)	27 October 1999	16 January 2003	3 years, 81 days	Nationalist Congress Party	Deshmukh I	Vilasrao Deshmukh
30		Sushilkumar Shinde (MLA for Solapur South Constituency No. 251- Solapur District) (Legislative Assembly) (Chief Minister)	18 January 2003	01 November 2004	1 year, 295 days	Indian National Congress	Sushilkumar	Sushilkumar Shinde
31		Vilasrao Deshmukh (MLA for Latur City Constituency No. 235- Latur District) (Legislative Assembly) (Chief Minister)	09 November 2004	01 December 2007	4 years, 22 days	Nationalist Congress Party	Deshmukh II	Vilasrao Deshmukh
32		Dilip Walse-Patil (MLA for Ambegaon Constituency No. 196- Pune District) (Legislative Assembly)	08 December 2008	06 November 2009	333 days	Nationalist Congress Party	Ashok I	Ashok Chavan
33		Sunil Tatkare (MLA for Shrivardhan Constituency No. 193- Raigad District) (Legislative Assembly)	07 November 2009	10 November; 201p	1 year, 3 days	Nationalist Congress Party	Ashok II	Ashok Chavan
34		Ajit Pawar (MLA for Baramati Constituency No. 201- Pune District (Legislative Assembly) (Deputy Chief Minister)	11 November 2010	25 September 2012	1 year, 319 days	Nationalist Congress Party	Prithviraj	Prithviraj Chavan
35		Prithviraj Chavan (MLC for Elected by MLAs Constituency No. 19 - Satara District) (Legislative Council) (Chief Minister)	25 September 2012	07 December 2012	73 days	Indian National Congress	Prithviraj	Prithviraj Chavan
36		Ajit Pawar (MLA for Baramati Constituency No. 201- Pune District (Legislative Assembly) (Deputy Chief Minister)	07 December 2012	26 September 2014	1 year, 293 days	Nationalist Congress Party	Prithviraj	Prithviraj Chavan
37	Sudhir Mungantiwar1	Sudhir Mungantiwar (MLA for Ballarpur Constituency No. 72- Chandrapur District) (Legislative Assembly)	31 October 2014	12 November 2019	5 years, 12 days	Bharatiya Janata Party	Fadnavis I	Devendra Fadnavis
38		Devendra Fadnavis (MLA for Nagpur South West Constituency No. 52- Nagpur District) (Legislative Assembly) (Chief Minister) (In Charge)	23 November 2019	28 November 2019	5 days	Bharatiya Janata Party	Fadnavis II	Devendra Fadnavis
39		Jayant Patil (MLA for Islampur Constituency No. 283- Sangli District) (Legislative Assembly)	28 November 2019	30 December 2019	32 days	Nationalist Congress Party	Thackeray	Uddhav Thackeray
40		Ajit Pawar (MLA for Baramati Constituency No. 201- Pune District (Legislative Assembly) (Deputy Chief Minister)	30 December 2019	29 June 2022	2 years, 181 days	Nationalist Congress Party	Thackeray	Uddhav Thackeray
41		Eknath Shinde (MLA for Kopri-Pachpakhadi Constituency No. 147- Thane District) (Legislative Assembly) (Chief Minister) (In Charge)	30 June 2022	14 August 2022	45 days	Shiv Sena (2022–present)	Eknath	Eknath Shinde
42		Devendra Fadnavis (MLA for Nagpur South West Constituency No. 52- Nagpur District) (Legislative Assembly) (Deputy Chief Minister)	14 August 2022	14 July 2023	334 days	Bharatiya Janata Party	Eknath	Eknath Shinde
43		Ajit Pawar (MLA for Baramati Constituency No. 201- Pune District (Legislative Assembly) (Deputy Chief Minister)	14 July 2023	26 November 2024	1 year, 135 days	Nationalist Congress Party	Eknath	Eknath Shinde
44		Devendra Fadnavis (MLA for Nagpur South West Constituency No. 52- Nagpur District) (Legislative Assembly) (Chief_Minister); In Charge	05 December 2024	21 December 2024	16 days	Bharatiya Janata Party	Fadnavis III	Devendra Fadnavis
45		Ajit Pawar (MLA for Baramati Constituency No. 201- Pune District (Legislative Assembly) (Deputy Chief Minister)	21 December 2024	28 January 2026	1 year, 38 days	Nationalist Congress Party (Ajit Pawar Group)	Fadnavis III	Devendra Fadnavis
46		Devendra Fadnavis (MLA for Nagpur South West Constituency No. 52- Nagpur District) (Legislative Assembly) (Chief Minister); Additional Charge	28 January 2026	Incumbent	223 days	Bharatiya Janata Party	Fadnavis III	Devendra Fadnavis

== Ministers of State ==
No.	Portrait	Deputy Minister (Constituency)	Term of office			Political party	Ministry	Minister	Chief Minister
No.	Portrait	Deputy Minister (Constituency)	From	To	Period	Political party	Ministry	Minister	Chief Minister
Deputy Minister of Planning
Vacant			23 November 2019	28 November 2019	5 days	NA	Fadnavis II	Devendra Fadnavis	Devendra Fadnavis
01		Shambhuraj Desai (MLA for Patan Constituency No. 261- Satara District) (Legislative Assembly)	30 December 2019	27 June 2022	2 years, 179 days	Shiv Sena	Thackeray	Ajit Pawar	Uddhav Thackeray
02		Vishwajeet Kadam (MLA for Palus-Kadegaon Constituency No. 285- Sangli District) (Legislative Assembly); Additional_Charge	27 June 2022	29 June 2022	2 days	Nationalist Congress Party	Thackeray	Ajit Pawar	Uddhav Thackeray
Vacant			30 June 2022	26 November 2024	2 years, 149 days	NA	Eknath	Eknath Shinde (2022 - 2022); Devendra Fadnavis (2022 - 2023); Ajit Pawar (2023–2026)	Eknath Shinde
03		Ashish Jaiswal (MLA for Ramtek Constituency No. 59- Nagpur District) (Legislative Assembly)	21 December 2024	Incumbent	1 year, 261 days	Shiv Sena (Shinde Group)	Fadnavis III	Ajit Pawar (2024 – 2026); Devendra Fadnavis Additional Charge (2026 – Present)	Devendra Fadnavis

== Organizational structure ==
Cabinet minister is head of the department. Cabinet minister is assisted by the Minister of State. Secretary from Indian Administrative Service cadre is responsible for execution of policies.

== Directorate of Economics and Statistics ==
Special directorate is responsible for collecting statistics in Maharashtra for planning purpose.
Functions of DES

- Collect official statistics
- Data collection through surveys,
- Censuses
- Publish statistical publications regularly
- Offer training to statistical personnel
- Co-ordinate the work of statistical sections in different departments

Directorate also acts as liaison between Government of India and Government of Maharashtra.

== Maharashtra Remote Sensing Application Centre (MRSAC) ==
MRSAC is an autonomous body under Ministry of Planning. MRSAC is a Nodal Agency for designing a Maharashtra Geo-Spatial Digital Database System-(MGDDS). Farm yields are improved in Maharashtra using artificial intelligence and satellite images.
