= Ministry of Information Technology (Maharashtra) =

Maharashtra government ministry responsible for Information Technology

Ministry of Information Technology Government of Maharashtra
- मंत्रालय माहिती तंत्रज्ञान विभाग, महाराष्ट्र शासन
- Seal of the state of Maharashtra

- Building of Administrative Headquarters of Mumbai

Ministry overview
- Jurisdiction: (India) Maharashtra
- Headquarters: Mantralay, Mumbai
- Minister responsible: Ashish Shelar, Cabinet Minister
- Deputy Minister responsible: Vacant, TBD since 29 June 2022, Minister of State
- Ministry executive: (IAS)
- Parent department: Government of Maharashtra

The Ministry of Information Technology is a ministry of the Government of Maharashtra. It is responsible for preparing annual plans for the development of Maharashtra state.

The Ministry is headed by a cabinet level Minister. Ashish Shelar is Current Minister of Information Technology.

== Head office ==
Minister of Information Technology मंत्री माहिती तंत्रज्ञान
- Emblem of India

- Flag of India

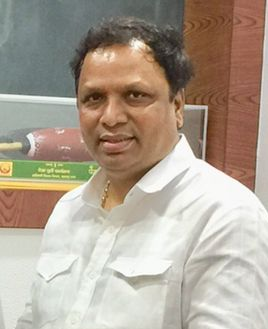
- Incumbent; Ashish Shelar since 21 December 2024
- Ministry of Information Technology
- Style: The Honourable
- Abbreviation: Cabinet Minister
- Member of: State Cabinet
- Reports to: Chief Minister, Maharashtra Legislature
- Seat: Mantralaya, Mumbai
- Appointer: Governor on the advice of the Chief Minister
- Term length: 5 years
- Precursor: Devendra Fadnavis (2024-2024)
- Inaugural holder: Yashwantrao Chavan (1960-1962)
- Formation: 1 May 1960
- Deputy: Vacant, TBD since 29 June 2022

== Cabinet Ministers ==
| No. | Portrait | Minister (Constituency) | Term of office | | | Political party | Ministry | Chief Minister |
| No. | Portrait | Minister (Constituency) | From | To | Period | Political party | Ministry | Chief Minister |
Minister of Information Technology
| 01 | | Yashwantrao Chavan (MLA for Karad North Constituency No. 259- Satara District) (Legislative Assembly) (Chief Minister) | 01 May 1960 | 07 March 1962 | 1 year, 310 days | Indian National Congress | Yashwantrao I | Yashwantrao Chavan |
| 02 | | Yashwantrao Chavan (MLA for Karad North Constituency No. 259- Satara District) (Legislative Assembly) (Chief Minister) | 08 March 1962 | 19 November 1962 | 256 days | Indian National Congress | Yashwantrao II | Yashwantrao Chavan |
| 03 | | P. K. Sawant (MLA for Chiplun Constituency No. 265- Ratnagiri District) (Legislative Assembly) | 20 November 1962 | 24 November 1963 | 1 year, 4 days | Indian National Congress | Kannamwar l | Marotrao Kannamwar |
| 04 | | P. K. Sawant (MLA for Chiplun Constituency No. 265- Ratnagiri District) (Legislative Assembly) (Interim Chief Minister) | 25 November 1962 | 04 December 1963 | 9 days | Indian National Congress | Sawant I | P. K. Sawant |
| 05 | | Balasaheb Desai (MLA for Patan Constituency No. 261- Satara District) (Legislative Assembly) | 05 December 1963 | 01 March 1967 | 3 years, 86 days | Indian National Congress | Vasantrao I | Vasantrao Naik |
| 06 | | Vasantrao Naik (MLA for Pusad Constituency No. 81- Yavatmal District) (Legislative Assembly) (Chief Minister) | 01 March 1967 | 13 March 1972 | 5 years, 12 days | Indian National Congress | Vasantrao II | Vasantrao Naik |
| 07 | | Vasantdada Patil (MLC for Elected by MLAs Constituency No. 20 - Sangli District) (Legislative Council) | 13 March 1972 | 21 February 1975 | 2 years, 345 days | Indian National Congress | Vasantrao III | Vasantrao Naik |
| 09 | | Shankarrao Chavan (MLA for Bhokar Constituency No. 85- Nanded District) (Legislative Assembly) (Chief Minister) | 21 February 1975 | 17 May 1977 | 2 years, 85 days | Indian National Congress | Shankarrao I | Shankarrao Chavan |
| 10 | | Vasantdada Patil (MLC for Elected by MLAs Constituency No. 20 - Sangli District) (Legislative Council) (Chief Minister) | 17 May 1977 | 07 March 1978 | 1 year, 294 days | Indian National Congress | Vasantdada I | Vasantdada Patil |
| 11 | | Nashikrao Tirpude (MLA for Bhandara Constituency No. 61- Bhandara District) (Legislative Assembly) (Deputy Chief Minister) | 07 March 1978 | 18 July 1978 | 133 days | Indian National Congress (U) | Vasantdada II | Vasantdada Patil |
| 12 | | Sharad Pawar (MLA for Baramati Constituency No. 201- Pune District) (Legislative Assembly) (Chief Minister) | 18 July 1978 | 17 February 1980 | 1 year, 214 days | Indian Congress (Socialist) | Pawar I | Sharad Pawar |
| 13 | | Abdul Rahman Antulay (MLA for Shrivardhan Constituency No. 193- Raigad District) (Legislative Assembly) (Chief Minister) | 09 June 1980 | 21 January 1982 | 1 year, 226 days | Indian National Congress | Antulay | Abdul Rahman Antulay |
| 14 | | Babasaheb Bhosale (MLA for Nehrunagar Constituency No. 172- Mumbai Suburban District) (Legislative Assembly) (Chief Minister) | 21 January 1982 | 02 February 1983 | 1 year, 12 days | Indian National Congress | Bhosale | Babasaheb Bhosale |
| 15 | | Ramrao Adik (MLC for Elected by MLAs Constituency No. 05 - Ahmednagar District) (Legislative Council) (Deputy Chief Minister) | 07 February 1983 | 05 March 1985 | 2 years, 26 days | Indian National Congress | Vasantdada III | Vasantdada Patil |
| 16 | | Vasantdada Patil (MLA for Sangli Constituency No. 282- Sangli District) (Legislative Assembly) (Chief Minister) | 12 March 1985; 1960 | 03 June 1985; 1962 | 83 days | Indian National Congress | Vasantdada IV | Vasantdada Patil |
| 17 | | Shivajirao Patil Nilangekar (MLA for Nilanga Constituency No. 238- Latur District) (Legislative Assembly) (Chief Minister) | 03 June 1985 | 12 March 1986 | 282 days | Indian National Congress | Nilangekar | Shivajirao Patil Nilangekar |
| 18 | | Shankarrao Chavan (MLC for Elected by MLAs Constituency No. 08 - Nanded District) (Legislative Council) (Chief Minister) | 12 March 1986 | 26 June 1988 | 2 years, 106 days | Indian National Congress | Shankarrao II | Shankarrao Chavan |
| 19 | | Sharad Pawar (MLA for Baramati Constituency No. 201- Pune District) (Legislative Assembly) (Chief Minister) | 26 June 1988 | 03 March 1990 | 1 year, 250 days | Indian National Congress | Pawar II | Sharad Pawar |
| 20 | | Sharad Pawar (MLA for Baramati Constituency No. 201- Pune District) (Legislative Assembly) (Chief Minister) | 04 March 1990 | 25 June 1991 | 1 year, 113 days | Indian National Congress | Pawar III | Sharad Pawar |
| 21 | | Sudhakarrao Naik (MLA for Pusad Constituency No. 81- Yavatmal District) (Legislative Assembly) (Chief Minister) | 25 June 1991 | 22 February 1993 | 1 year, 242 days | Indian National Congress | Sudhakarrao | Sudhakarrao Naik |
| 22 | | Sharad Pawar (MLA for Baramati Constituency No. 201- Pune District) (Legislative Assembly) (Chief Minister) | 06 March 1993 | 14 March 1995 | 2 years, 8 days | Indian National Congress | Pawar IV | Sharad Pawar |
| 23 | | Manohar Joshi (MLA for Dadar Constituency No. 181- Mumbai City District) (Legislative Assembly); Chief Minister) | 14 March 1995 | 31 January 1999 | 3 years, 323 days | Shiv Sena | Joshi | Manohar Joshi |
| 24 | | Narayan Rane (MLA for Malvan Constituency No. 269- Sindhudurg District) (Legislative Assembly) (Chief Minister) | 01 February 1999 | 17 October 1999 | 258 days | Shiv Sena | Rane | Narayan Rane |
| 25 | | Vilasrao Deshmukh (MLA for Latur City Constituency No. 235- Latur District) (Legislative Assembly) (Chief Minister) | 19 October 1999 | 16 January 2003 | 3 years, 88 days | Indian National Congress | Deshmukh I | Vilasrao Deshmukh |
| 26 | | Sushilkumar Shinde (MLA for Solapur South Constituency No. 251- Solapur District) (Legislative Assembly) (Chief Minister) | 18 January 2003 | 01 November 2004 | 1 year, 295 days | Indian National Congress | Sushilkumar | Sushilkumar Shinde |
| 27 | | Vilasrao Deshmukh (MLA for Latur City Constituency No. 235- Latur District) (Legislative Assembly) (Chief Minister) | 09 November 2004 | 01 December 2007 | 4 years, 22 days | Indian National Congress | Deshmukh II | Vilasrao Deshmukh |
| 28 | | Ashok Chavan (MLA for Bhokar Constituency No. 85- Nanded District) (Legislative Assembly) (Chief Minister) | 08 December 2008 | 06 November 2009 | 333 days | Indian National Congress | Ashok I | Ashok Chavan |
| 29 | | Ashok Chavan (MLA for Bhokar Constituency No. 85- Nanded District) (Legislative Assembly) (Chief Minister) | 07 November 2009 | 10 November; 201p | 1 year, 3 days | Indian National Congress | Ashok II | Ashok Chavan |
| 30 | | Prithviraj Chavan (MLC for Elected by MLAs Constituency No. 19 - Satara District) (Legislative Council) (Chief Minister) | 11 November 2010 | 26 September 2014 | 3 years, 319 days | Indian National Congress | Prithviraj | Prithviraj Chavan |
| 31 | | Devendra Fadnavis (MLA for Nagpur South West Constituency No. 52- Nagpur District) (Legislative Assembly) (Chief Minister) | 31 October 2014 | 12 November 2019 | 5 years, 12 days | Bharatiya Janata Party | Fadnavis I | Devendra Fadnavis |
| 32 | | Devendra Fadnavis (MLA for Nagpur South West Constituency No. 52- Nagpur District) (Legislative Assembly) (Chief Minister) (In Charge) | 23 November 2019 | 28 November 2019 | 5 days | Bharatiya Janata Party | Fadnavis II | Devendra Fadnavis |
| 33 | | Uddhav Thackeray (MLC for Elected by MLAs Constituency No. 25 - Mumbai Suburban District) (Legislative Council) (Chief Minister) | 28 November 2019 | 30 December 2019 | 32 days | Shiv Sena | Thackeray | Uddhav Thackeray |
| 34 | | Uddhav Thackeray (MLC for Elected by MLAs Constituency No. 25 - Mumbai Suburban District) (Legislative Council) (Chief Minister) | 30 December 2019 | 29 June 2022 | 2 years, 181 days | Shiv Sena | Thackeray | Uddhav Thackeray |
| 35 | | Eknath Shinde (MLA for Kopri-Pachpakhadi Constituency No. 147- Thane District) (Legislative Assembly) (Chief Minister) (In Charge) | 30 June 2022 | 14 August 2022 | 45 days | Shiv Sena (2022–present) | Eknath | Eknath Shinde |
| 36 | | Eknath Shinde (MLA for Kopri-Pachpakhadi Constituency No. 147- Thane District) (Legislative Assembly) (Chief Minister) | 14 August 2022 | 26 November 2024 | 2 years, 104 days | Shiv Sena (2022–present) | Eknath | Eknath Shinde |
| 37 | | Devendra Fadnavis (MLA for Nagpur South West Constituency No. 52- Nagpur District) (Legislative Assembly) (Chief_Minister); In Charge | 05 December 2024 | 21 December 2024 | 16 days | Bharatiya Janata Party | Fadnavis III | Devendra Fadnavis |
| 38 | | Ashish Shelar (MLA for Vandre West Constituency No. 177- Mumbai Suburban District) (Legislative Assembly) | 21 December 2024 | Incumbent | 1 year, 261 days | Bharatiya Janata Party | Fadnavis III | Devendra Fadnavis |

== Ministers of State ==
| No. | Portrait | Deputy Minister (Constituency) | Term of office | | | Political party | Ministry | Minister | Chief Minister |
| No. | Portrait | Deputy Minister (Constituency) | From | To | Period | Political party | Ministry | Minister | Chief Minister |
Deputy Minister of Information Technology
| Vacant | | | 23 November 2019 | 28 November 2019 | 5 days | NA | Fadnavis II | Devendra Fadnavis | Devendra Fadnavis |
| 01 | | Satej Patil (MLC for Elected by Kolhapur Local Authorities Constituency No. 06 - Kolhapur District) (Legislative Council) | 30 December 2019 | 29 June 2022 | 2 years, 181 days | Indian National Congress | Thackeray | Uddhav Thackeray | Uddhav Thackeray |
| Vacant | | | 30 June 2022 | 26 November 2024 | 2 years, 149 days | NA | Eknath | Eknath Shinde | Eknath Shinde |
| Vacant | | | 21 December 2024 | incumbent | 1 year, 261 days | NA | Fadnavis III | Ashish Shelar (2024 – Present) | Devendra Fadnavis |

== List of Ministers For Communications (1960 - 1977) ==
| No. | Portrait | Minister (Constituency) | Term of office | | | Political party | Ministry | Chief Minister |
| No. | Portrait | Minister (Constituency) | From | To | Period | Political party | Ministry | Chief Minister |
Minister of Communications
Starting on 1 May 1960
| 01 | | Marotrao Kannamwar (MLA for Saoli Constituency No. 73- Chandrapur District) (Legislative Assembly) | 01 May 1960 | 07 March 1962 | 1 year, 310 days | Indian National Congress | Yashwantrao I | Yashwantrao Chavan |
| 02 | | Marotrao Kannamwar (MLA for Saoli Constituency No. 73- Chandrapur District) (Legislative Assembly) | 08 March 1962 | 19 November 1962 | 256 days | Indian National Congress | Yashwantrao II | Yashwantrao Chavan |
| 03 | | Marotrao Kannamwar (MLA for Saoli Constituency No. 73- Chandrapur District) (Legislative Assembly) (Chief Minister) | 20 November 1962 | 24 November 1963 | 1 year, 4 days | Indian National Congress | Kannamwar l | Marotrao Kannamwar |
| 04 | | P. K. Sawant (MLA for Chiplun Constituency No. 265- Ratnagiri District) (Legislative Assembly) (Interim Chief Minister) | 25 November 1962 | 04 December 1963 | 9 days | Indian National Congress | Sawant I | P. K. Sawant |
| 05 | | Madhukar Dhanaji Chaudhari (MLA for Raver Constituency No. 11- Jalgaon District) (Legislative Assembly) | 05 December 1963 | 01 March 1967 | 3 years, 86 days | Indian National Congress | Vasantrao I | Vasantrao Naik |
| 06 | | Madhukar Dhanaji Chaudhari (MLA for Raver Constituency No. 11- Jalgaon District) (Legislative Assembly) | 01 March 1967 | 13 March 1972 | 5 years, 12 days | Indian National Congress | Vasantrao II | Vasantrao Naik |
| 07 | | Yashwantrao Mohite (MLA for Raver Constituency No. 11- Jalgaon District) (Legislative Assembly) | 13 March 1972 | 21 February 1975 | 2 years, 345 days | Indian National Congress | Vasantrao III | Vasantrao Naik |
| 08 | | Abdul Rahman Antulay (MLA for Shrivardhan Constituency No. 193- Raigad District) (Legislative Assembly) | 21 February 1975 | 17 May 1977 | 2 years, 85 days | Indian National Congress | Shankarrao I | Shankarrao Chavan |
Ending on 16 April 1977
