= Ministry of Urban Development (Maharashtra) =

Government department of Maharashtra, India

Ministry of Urban Development Government of Maharashtra
- मंत्रालय नगर विकास विभाग महाराष्ट्र शासन
- Seal of the state of Maharashtra

- Building of Administrative Headquarters of Mumbai

Agency overview
- Formed: 1960; 66 years ago
- Preceding agency: Department of Urban Development
- Jurisdiction: Chief Minister of Maharashtra
- Headquarters: Mantralaya, Mumbai
- Annual budget: State budget of Government of Maharashtra
- Minister responsible: Eknath Shinde, Deputy Chief Minister and Minister of Urban Development
- Deputy Minister responsible: Madhuri Misal, Minister of State
- Agency executives: AsheemKumar S K Gupta, Principal Secretary; -, Joint Secretary; -, Deputy Secretary

The Ministry of Urban Development Department Maharashtra is a Ministry of the Government of Maharashtra.

The Ministry is currently headed by Eknath Shinde he is Deputy Chief Minister of Maharashtra and Minister of Urban Development.

== Cabinet Ministers ==
No.	Portrait	Minister (Constituency)	Term of office			Political party	Ministry	Chief Minister
No.	Portrait	Minister (Constituency)	From	To	Period	Political party	Ministry	Chief Minister
Minister of Urban Development
01		D. S. Palaspagar (MLC for Elected by MLAs Constituency No. 19 - Bhandara District) (Legislative Council)	01 May 1960	07 March 1962	1 year, 310 days	Indian National Congress	Yashwantrao I	Yashwantrao Chavan
02		Madhukar Dhanaji Chaudhari (MLA for Raver Constituency No. 11- Jalgaon District) (Legislative Assembly)	08 March 1962	19 November 1962	256 days	Indian National Congress	Yashwantrao II	Yashwantrao Chavan
03		Shankarrao Chavan (MLA for Bhokar Constituency No. 85- Nanded District) (Legislative Assembly)	20 November 1962	24 November 1963	1 year, 4 days	Indian National Congress	Kannamwar l	Marotrao Kannamwar
04		P. K. Sawant (MLA for Chiplun Constituency No. 265- Ratnagiri District) (Legislative Assembly) (Interim Chief Minister)	25 November 1962	04 December 1963	9 days	Indian National Congress	Sawant I	P. K. Sawant
05		Shankarrao Chavan (MLA for Bhokar Constituency No. 85- Nanded District) (Legislative Assembly)	05 December 1963	01 March 1967	3 years, 86 days	Indian National Congress	Vasantrao I	Vasantrao Naik
06		Narendra Mahipati Tidke (MLA for Savner Constituency No. 49- Nagpur District) (Legislative Assembly)	01 March 1967	27 October 1969	2 years, 240 days	Indian National Congress	Vasantrao II	Vasantrao Naik
07		Balasaheb Desai (MLA for Patan Constituency No. 261- Satara District) (Legislative Assembly)	27 October 1969	13 March 1972	2 years, 138 days	Indian National Congress	Vasantrao II	Vasantrao Naik
08		Rafique Zakaria (MLC for Elected by MLAs Constituency No. 16 - Mumbai Suburban District) (Legislative Council)	13 March 1972	17 Match; 1974	2 years, 4 days	Indian National Congress	Vasantrao III	Vasantrao Naik
09		Narendra Mahipati Tidke (MLA for Savner Constituency No. 49- Nagpur District) (Legislative Assembly)	17 Match; 1974	21 February 1975	341 days	Indian National Congress	Vasantrao III	Vasantrao Naik
10		Rafique Zakaria (MLC for Elected by MLAs Constituency No. 16 - Mumbai Suburban District) (Legislative Council)	21 February 1975	17 May 1977	2 years, 85 days	Indian National Congress	Shankarrao I	Shankarrao Chavan
11		Ratnappa Kumbhar (MLA for Shirol Constituency No. 280- Kolhapur District (Legislative Assembly)	17 May 1977	07 March 1978	1 year, 294 days	Indian National Congress	Vasantdada I	Vasantdada Patil
12		Vasantdada Patil (MLA for Sangli Constituency No. 282 - Sangli District) (Legislative Assembly) (Chief Minister)	07 March 1978	18 July 1978	133 days	Indian National Congress (U)	Vasantdada II	Vasantdada Patil
13		Hashu Advani (MLA for Chembur Constituency No. 173- Mumbai Suburban District) (Legislative Assembly)	18 July 1978	17 February 1980	1 year, 214 days	Janata Party	Pawar I	Sharad Pawar
14		Ramrao Adik (MLC for Elected by MLAs Constituency No. 05 - Ahmednagar District) (Legislative Council)	09 June 1980	21 January 1982	1 year, 226 days	Indian National Congress	Antulay	Abdul Rahman Antulay
15		Babasaheb Bhosale (MLA for Nehrunagar Constituency No. 172- Mumbai Suburban District) (Legislative Assembly) (Chief Minister)	21 January 1982	11 October 1982	263 days	Indian National Congress	Bhosale	Babasaheb Bhosale
16		Pratibha Patil (MLA for Jalgaon City Constituency No. 13- Jalgaon District) (Legislative Assembly)	11 October 1982	02 February 1983	114 days	Indian National Congress	Bhosale	Babasaheb Bhosale
17		Ramrao Adik (MLC for Elected by MLAs Constituency No. 05 - Ahmednagar District) (Legislative Council)	07 February 1983	05 March 1985	2 years, 26 days	Indian National Congress	Vasantdada III	Vasantdada Patil
18		Vasantdada Patil (MLA for Sangli Constituency No. 282 - Sangli District) (Legislative Assembly) (Chief Minister)	12 March 1985; 1960	03 June 1985; 1962	83 days	Indian National Congress	Vasantdada IV	Vasantdada Patil
19		Shivajirao Patil Nilangekar (MLA for Nilanga Constituency No. 238- Latur District) (Legislative Assembly) (Chief Minister)	03 June 1985	12 March 1986	282 days	Indian National Congress	Nilangekar	Shivajirao Patil Nilangekar
20		V. Subramanian (MLA for South Mumbai Constituency No. 121- Mumbai City District) (Legislative Assembly)	12 March 1986	26 June 1988	2 years, 106 days	Indian National Congress	Shankarrao II	Shankarrao Chavan
21		Ishaq Jamkhanawala (MLA for Nagpada Constituency No. 188- Mumbai City District (Legislative Assembly)	26 June 1988	03 March 1990	1 year, 250 days	Indian National Congress	Pawar II	Sharad Pawar
22		Sushilkumar Shinde (MLA for Solapur City Central Constituency No. 249- Solapur District) (Legislative Assembly)	04 March 1990	25 June 1991	1 year, 113 days	Indian National Congress	Pawar III	Sharad Pawar
23		Sushilkumar Shinde (MLA for Solapur City Central Constituency No. 249- Solapur District) (Legislative Assembly)	25 June 1991	22 February 1993	1 year, 242 days	Indian National Congress	Sudhakarrao	Sudhakarrao Naik
24		Arun Gujarathi (MLA for Chopda Constituency No. 10- Jalgaon District (Legislative Assembly)	06 March 1993	14 March 1995	2 years, 8 days	Indian National Congress	Pawar IV	Sharad Pawar
25		Dattatraya Rane (MLA for Shivadi Constituency No. 183- Mumbai City District (Legislative Assembly)	14 March 1995	31 January 1999	3 years, 323 days	Bharatiya Janata Party	Joshi	Manohar Joshi
26		Dattatraya Rane (MLA for Shivadi Constituency No. 183- Mumbai City District (Legislative Assembly)	01 February 1999	11 May 1999	99 days	Shiv Sena	Rane	Narayan Rane
27		Sudhir Joshi (MLC for Elected by MLAs Constituency No. 21 - Mumbai City District) (Legislative Council)	11 May 1999	17 October 1999	159 days	Bharatiya Janata Party	Rane	Narayan Rane
28		Vilasrao Deshmukh (MLA for Latur City Constituency No. 235- Latur District) (Legislative Assembly) (Chief Minister)	19 October 1999	16 January 2003	3 years, 88 days	Indian National Congress	Deshmukh I	Vilasrao Deshmukh
29		Sushilkumar Shinde (MLA for Solapur South Constituency No. 251- Solapur District) (Legislative Assembly) (Chief Minister)	18 January 2003	01 November 2004	1 year, 295 days	Indian National Congress	Sushilkumar	Sushilkumar Shinde
30		Vilasrao Deshmukh (MLA for Latur City Constituency No. 235- Latur District) (Legislative Assembly) (Chief Minister)	09 November 2004	01 December 2007	4 years, 22 days	Indian National Congress	Deshmukh II	Vilasrao Deshmukh
31		Ashok Chavan (MLA for Bhokar Constituency No. 85- Nanded District) (Legislative Assembly) (Chief Minister)	08 December 2008	06 November 2009	333 days	Indian National Congress	Ashok I	Ashok Chavan
32		Ashok Chavan (MLA for Bhokar Constituency No. 85- Nanded District) (Legislative Assembly) (Chief Minister)	07 November 2009	10 November; 201p	1 year, 3 days	Indian National Congress	Ashok II	Ashok Chavan
33		Prithviraj Chavan (MLC for Elected by MLAs Constituency No. 19 - Satara District) (Legislative Council) (Chief Minister)	11 November 2010	26 September 2014	3 years, 319 days	Indian National Congress	Prithviraj	Prithviraj Chavan
34		Devendra Fadnavis (MLA for Nagpur South West Constituency No. 52- Nagpur District) (Legislative Assembly) (Chief Minister)	31 October 2014	12 November 2019	5 years, 12 days	Bharatiya Janata Party	Fadnavis I	Devendra Fadnavis
35		Devendra Fadnavis (MLA for Nagpur South West Constituency No. 52- Nagpur District) (Legislative Assembly) (Chief Minister) (In Charge)	23 November 2019	28 November 2019	5 days	Bharatiya Janata Party	Fadnavis II	Devendra Fadnavis
36		Eknath Shinde (MLA for Kopri-Pachpakhadi Constituency No. 147- Thane District) (Legislative Assembly)	28 November 2019	30 December 2019	32 days	Shiv Sena	Thackeray	Uddhav Thackeray
37		Eknath Shinde (MLA for Kopri-Pachpakhadi Constituency No. 147- Thane District) (Legislative Assembly)	30 December 2019	29 June 2022	2 years, 181 days	Shiv Sena	Thackeray	Uddhav Thackeray
38		Subhash Desai (MLC for Elected by MLAs Constituency No. 09 - Mumbai Suburban District) (Legislative Council)	27 June 2022	29 June 2022	2 days	Shiv Sena	Thackeray	Uddhav Thackeray
39		Eknath Shinde (MLA for Kopri-Pachpakhadi Constituency No. 147- Thane District) (Legislative Assembly) (Chief Minister) (In Charge)	30 June 2022	14 August 2022	45 days	Shiv Sena (Shinde Group)	Eknath	Eknath Shinde
40		Eknath Shinde (MLA for Kopri-Pachpakhadi Constituency No. 147- Thane District) (Legislative Assembly) (Chief Minister)	14 August 2022	26 November 2024	2 years, 104 days	Shiv Sena (2022–present)	Eknath	Eknath Shinde
41		Devendra Fadnavis (MLA for Nagpur South West Constituency No. 52- Nagpur District) (Legislative Assembly) (Chief_Minister); In Charge	05 December 2024	21 December 2024	16 days	Bharatiya Janata Party	Fadnavis III	Devendra Fadnavis
42		Eknath Shinde (MLA for Kopri-Pachpakhadi Constituency No. 147- Thane District) (Legislative Assembly) (Deputy Chief Minister)	21 December 2024	Incumbent	1 year, 231 days	Shiv Sena (2022–present)	Fadnavis III	Devendra Fadnavis

== Ministers of State ==
No.	Portrait	Deputy Minister (Constituency)	Term of office			Political party	Ministry	Minister	Chief Minister
No.	Portrait	Deputy Minister (Constituency)	From	To	Period	Political party	Ministry	Minister	Chief Minister
Deputy Minister of Urban Development
The Post of Deputy Minister / Minister of States has been kept Vacant from 23 November 2019 To 28 November 2019			23 November 2019	28 November 2019	5 days	NA	Fadnavis II	Devendra Fadnavis	Devendra Fadnavis
01		Prajakt Tanpure (MLA for Rahuri Constituency No. 223- Ahmednagar District) (Legislative Assembly)	30 December 2019	30 June 2022	2 years, 181 days	Nationalist Congress Party	Thackeray	Eknath Shinde	Uddhav Thackeray
The Post of Deputy Minister / Minister of States has been kept Vacant from 30 June 2022			30 June 2022	26 November 2024	2 years, 149 days	NA	Eknath	Eknath Shinde	Eknath Shinde
02		Madhuri Misal (MLA for Parvati Constituency No. 212- Pune District) (Legislative Assembly)	21 December 2024	incumbent	1 year, 231 days	Bharatiya Janata Party	Fadnavis III	Eknath Shinde	Devendra Fadnavis
