= Ministry of General Administration (Maharashtra) =

Maharashtra government ministry responsible for General Administration

Ministry of General Administration Government of Maharashtra
- मंत्रालय सामान्य प्रशासन विभाग, महाराष्ट्र शासन
- Seal of the state of Maharashtra

- Building of Administrative Headquarters of Mumbai

Ministry overview
- Jurisdiction: (India) Maharashtra
- Headquarters: Mantralay, Mumbai
- Minister responsible: Devendra Fadnavis, Chief Minister
- Deputy Minister responsible: Vacant, TBD since 29 June 2022, Minister of State
- Ministry executives: Chief Secretary, Mr. ManuKumar Srivastava, (IAS); Additional Chief Secretary, Smt. Sujata Saunik, (IAS); Deputy secretary, Shri. Hemant Sudhakar Dange, Maharashtra Civil service
- Parent department: Government of Maharashtra
- Website: general%20administration.maharashtra.gov.in/default.aspx

The Ministry of General Administration सामान्य प्रशासन विभाग, महाराष्ट्र शासन is a ministry of the Government of Maharashtra. It is responsible for preparing annual plans for the development of Maharashtra state.

The Ministry is headed by a cabinet level Minister. Devendra Fadnavis is Current Minister of General Administration and Chief Minister of Maharashtra.

== Office ==
Minister of General Administration मंत्री सामान्य प्रशासन
- Emblem of India

- Flag of India

- Incumbent; Devendra Fadnavis; Chief Minister since 14 August 2022
- Ministry of General Administration
- Style: The Honourable
- Abbreviation: Cabinet Minister
- Member of: State Cabinet
- Reports to: Chief Minister, Maharashtra Legislature
- Seat: Mantralaya, Mumbai
- Appointer: Governor on the advice of the Chief Minister
- Term length: 5 years
- Precursor: Uddhav Thackeray (2019-2022)
- Inaugural holder: Yashwantrao Chavan (1960-1962)
- Formation: 1 May 1960
- Deputy: Vacant, TBD since 29 June 2022

== Cabinet Ministers ==
No.	Portrait	Minister (Constituency)	Term of office			Political party	Ministry	Chief Minister
No.	Portrait	Minister (Constituency)	From	To	Period	Political party	Ministry	Chief Minister
Minister of General Administration
01		Yashwantrao Chavan (MLA for Karad North Constituency No. 259- Satara District) (Legislative Assembly) (Chief Minister)	01 May 1960	07 March 1962	1 year, 310 days	Indian National Congress	Yashwantrao I	Yashwantrao Chavan
02		Yashwantrao Chavan (MLA for Karad North Constituency No. 259- Satara District) (Legislative Assembly) (Chief Minister)	08 March 1962	19 November 1962	256 days	Indian National Congress	Yashwantrao II	Yashwantrao Chavan
03		Marotrao Kannamwar; Chief Minister (MLA for Saoli Constituency No. 73- Chandrapur District) (Legislative Assembly)	20 November 1962	24 November 1963	1 year, 4 days	Indian National Congress	Kannamwar l	Marotrao Kannamwar
04		P. K. Sawant (MLA for Chiplun Constituency No. 265- Ratnagiri District) (Legislative Assembly) (Interim Chief Minister)	25 November 1962	04 December 1963	9 days	Indian National Congress	Sawant I	P. K. Sawant
05		Vasantrao Naik; Chief Minister (MLA for Pusad Constituency No. 81- Yavatmal District) (Legislative Assembly)	05 December 1963	01 March 1967	3 years, 86 days	Indian National Congress	Vasantrao I	Vasantrao Naik
06		Vasantrao Naik (MLA for Pusad Constituency No. 81- Yavatmal District) (Legislative Assembly) (Chief Minister)	01 March 1967	13 March 1972	5 years, 12 days	Indian National Congress	Vasantrao II	Vasantrao Naik
07		Vasantrao Naik (MLA for Pusad Constituency No. 81- Yavatmal District) (Legislative Assembly) (Chief Minister)	13 March 1972	21 February 1975	2 years, 345 days	Indian National Congress	Vasantrao III	Vasantrao Naik
09		Shankarrao Chavan (MLA for Bhokar Constituency No. 85- Nanded District) (Legislative Assembly) (Chief Minister)	21 February 1975	17 May 1977	2 years, 85 days	Indian National Congress	Shankarrao I	Shankarrao Chavan
10		Vasantdada Patil (MLC for Elected by MLAs Constituency No. 20 - Sangli District) (Legislative Council) (Chief Minister)	17 May 1977	07 March 1978	1 year, 294 days	Indian National Congress	Vasantdada I	Vasantdada Patil
11		Vasantdada Patil (MLA for Sangli Constituency No. 282- Sangli District) (Legislative Assembly) (Chief Minister)	07 March 1978	18 July 1978	133 days	Indian National Congress (U)	Vasantdada II	Vasantdada Patil
12		Sharad Pawar (MLA for Baramati Constituency No. 201- Pune District) (Legislative Assembly) (Chief Minister)	18 July 1978	17 February 1980	1 year, 214 days	Indian Congress (Socialist)	Pawar I	Sharad Pawar
13		Abdul Rahman Antulay (MLA for Shrivardhan Constituency No. 193- Raigad District) (Legislative Assembly) (Chief Minister)	09 June 1980	21 January 1982	1 year, 226 days	Indian National Congress	Antulay	Abdul Rahman Antulay
14		Babasaheb Bhosale (MLA for Nehrunagar Constituency No. 172- Mumbai Suburban District) (Legislative Assembly) (Chief Minister)	21 January 1982	02 February 1983	1 year, 12 days	Indian National Congress	Bhosale	Babasaheb Bhosale
15		Vasantdada Patil (MLA for Sangli Constituency No. 282- Sangli District) (Legislative Assembly) (Chief Minister)	07 February 1983	05 March 1985	2 years, 26 days	Indian National Congress	Vasantdada III	Vasantdada Patil
16		Vasantdada Patil (MLA for Sangli Constituency No. 282- Sangli District) (Legislative Assembly) (Chief Minister)	12 March 1985; 1960	03 June 1985; 1962	83 days	Indian National Congress	Vasantdada IV	Vasantdada Patil
17		Shivajirao Patil Nilangekar (MLA for Nilanga Constituency No. 238- Latur District) (Legislative Assembly) (Chief Minister)	03 June 1985	12 March 1986	282 days	Indian National Congress	Nilangekar	Shivajirao Patil Nilangekar
18		Shankarrao Chavan (MLC for Elected by MLAs Constituency No. 08 - Nanded District) (Legislative Council) (Chief Minister)	12 March 1986	26 June 1988	2 years, 106 days	Indian National Congress	Shankarrao II	Shankarrao Chavan
19		Sharad Pawar (MLA for Baramati Constituency No. 201- Pune District) (Legislative Assembly) (Chief Minister)	26 June 1988	03 March 1990	1 year, 250 days	Indian National Congress	Pawar II	Sharad Pawar
20		Sharad Pawar (MLA for Baramati Constituency No. 201- Pune District) (Legislative Assembly) (Chief Minister)	04 March 1990	25 June 1991	1 year, 113 days	Indian National Congress	Pawar III	Sharad Pawar
21		Sudhakarrao Naik (MLA for Pusad Constituency No. 81- Yavatmal District) (Legislative Assembly) (Chief Minister)	25 June 1991	22 February 1993	1 year, 242 days	Indian National Congress	Sudhakarrao	Sudhakarrao Naik
22		Sharad Pawar (MLA for Baramati Constituency No. 201- Pune District) (Legislative Assembly) (Chief Minister)	06 March 1993	14 March 1995	2 years, 8 days	Indian National Congress	Pawar IV	Sharad Pawar
23		Manohar Joshi (MLA for Dadar Constituency No. 181- Mumbai City District) (Legislative Assembly); Chief Minister)	14 March 1995	31 January 1999	3 years, 323 days	Shiv Sena	Joshi	Manohar Joshi
24		Narayan Rane (MLA for Malvan Constituency No. 269- Sindhudurg District) (Legislative Assembly) (Chief Minister)	01 February 1999	17 October 1999	258 days	Shiv Sena	Rane	Narayan Rane
25		Vilasrao Deshmukh (MLA for Latur City Constituency No. 235- Latur District) (Legislative Assembly) (Chief Minister)	19 October 1999	16 January 2003	3 years, 88 days	Indian National Congress	Deshmukh I	Vilasrao Deshmukh
26		Sushilkumar Shinde (MLA for Solapur South Constituency No. 251- Solapur District) (Legislative Assembly) (Chief Minister)	18 January 2003	01 November 2004	1 year, 295 days	Indian National Congress	Sushilkumar	Sushilkumar Shinde
27		Vilasrao Deshmukh (MLA for Latur City Constituency No. 235- Latur District) (Legislative Assembly) (Chief Minister)	09 November 2004	01 December 2007	4 years, 22 days	Indian National Congress	Deshmukh II	Vilasrao Deshmukh
28		Ashok Chavan (MLA for Bhokar Constituency No. 85- Nanded District) (Legislative Assembly) (Chief Minister)	08 December 2008	06 November 2009	333 days	Indian National Congress	Ashok I	Ashok Chavan
29		Ashok Chavan (MLA for Bhokar Constituency No. 85- Nanded District) (Legislative Assembly) (Chief Minister)	07 November 2009	10 November; 201p	1 year, 3 days	Indian National Congress	Ashok II	Ashok Chavan
30		Prithviraj Chavan (MLC for Elected by MLAs Constituency No. 19 - Satara District) (Legislative Council) (Chief Minister)	11 November 2010	26 September 2014	3 years, 319 days	Indian National Congress	Prithviraj	Prithviraj Chavan
31		Devendra Fadnavis (MLA for Nagpur South West Constituency No. 52- Nagpur District) (Legislative Assembly) (Chief Minister)	31 October 2014	12 November 2019	5 years, 12 days	Bharatiya Janata Party	Fadnavis I	Devendra Fadnavis
32		Devendra Fadnavis (MLA for Nagpur South West Constituency No. 52- Nagpur District) (Legislative Assembly) (Chief Minister) (In Charge)	23 November 2019	28 November 2019	5 days	Bharatiya Janata Party	Fadnavis II	Devendra Fadnavis
33		Uddhav Thackeray (MLC for Elected by MLAs Constituency No. 25 - Mumbai Suburban District) (Legislative Council) (Chief Minister)	28 November 2019	30 December 2019	32 days	Shiv Sena	Thackeray	Uddhav Thackeray
34		Uddhav Thackeray (MLC for Elected by MLAs Constituency No. 25 - Mumbai Suburban District) (Legislative Council) (Chief Minister)	30 December 2019	29 June 2022	2 years, 181 days	Shiv Sena	Thackeray	Uddhav Thackeray
35		Eknath Shinde (MLA for Kopri-Pachpakhadi Constituency No. 147- Thane District) (Legislative Assembly) (Chief Minister) (In Charge)	30 June 2022	14 August 2022	45 days	Shiv Sena (2022–present)	Eknath	Eknath Shinde
36		Eknath Shinde (MLA for Kopri-Pachpakhadi Constituency No. 147- Thane District) (Legislative Assembly) (Chief Minister)	14 August 2022	26 November 2024	2 years, 104 days	Shiv Sena	Eknath	Eknath Shinde
37		Devendra Fadnavis (MLA for Nagpur South West Constituency No. 52- Nagpur District) (Legislative Assembly) (Chief_Minister); In Charge	05 December 2024	Incumbent	1 year, 277 days	Bharatiya Janata Party	Fadnavis III	Devendra Fadnavis

== Ministers of State ==
No.	Portrait	Deputy Minister (Constituency)	Term of office			Political party	Ministry	Minister	Chief Minister
No.	Portrait	Deputy Minister (Constituency)	From	To	Period	Political party	Ministry	Minister	Chief Minister
Deputy Minister of General Administration
Vacant			23 November 2019	28 November 2019	5 days	NA	Fadnavis II	Devendra Fadnavis	Devendra Fadnavis
01		Dattatray Vithoba Bharne (MLA for Indapur Constituency No. 200- Pune District (Legislative Assembly)	30 December 2019	29 June 2022	2 years, 181 days	Nationalist Congress Party	Thackeray	Uddhav Thackeray	Uddhav Thackeray
Vacant			30 June 2022	26 November 2024	2 years, 149 days	NA	Eknath	Eknath Shinde	Eknath Shinde
Vacant			21 December 2024	incumbent	1 year, 261 days	NA	Fadnavis III	Devendra Fadnavis (2024 – Present)	Devendra Fadnavis

== List of principal secretaries ==
- ManuKumar Srivastava

== See also ==
- Chief Minister's Office (Maharashtra)
- Deputy Chief Minister's Office (Maharashtra)
