= Ministry of Home Affairs (Maharashtra) =

Ministry of Government of Maharashtra

Ministry of Home Affairs Government of Maharashtra
- गृह मंत्रालय, महाराष्ट्र शासन
- Seal of the state of Maharashtra

- Building of Administrative Headquarters of Mumbai

Agency overview
- Formed: 1960; 66 years ago
- Preceding agency: Department of Home Affairs
- Jurisdiction: State of Maharashtra
- Headquarters: Mantralaya, Mumbai
- Annual budget: State budget of Government of Maharashtra
- Minister responsible: Devendra Fadnavis, Chief Minister
- Deputy Ministers responsible: Yogesh Kadam (Urban), Minister of State; Pankaj Bhoyar (Rural), Minister of State
- Agency executives: -, Principal Secretary; -, Joint Secretary; -, Deputy Secretary

The Ministry of Home Affairs (IAST: Gṛha Mantrālaya, also known as the Home Department), or simply the Home Ministry, is a ministry of the Government of Maharashtra. It is headed by Minister of Home Affairs, currently Devendra Fadnavis since 14 August 2022.

It is responsible for the internal affairs of the state of Maharashtra, including Maharashtra Police, Home Guard and fire services.

== List ==
#	Portrait	Minister	Constituency	Term of office			Chief Minister	Party
1		Yashwantrao Chavan	Karad North	1 May 1960	7 March 1962	2 years, 203 days	himself	Indian National Congress
1		Yashwantrao Chavan	Karad North	8 March 1962	20 November 1962	2 years, 203 days	himself	Indian National Congress
2		P. K. Sawant	Chiplun	20 November 1962	24 November 1963	1 year, 15 days	Marotrao Kannamwar	Indian National Congress
2		P. K. Sawant	Chiplun	25 November 1963	5 December 1963	1 year, 15 days	himself	Indian National Congress
3		Balasaheb Desai	Patan	5 December 1963	1 March 1967	3 years, 86 days	Vasantrao Naik	Indian National Congress
4		Vasantrao Naik	Pusad	1 March 1967	27 October 1969	2 years, 240 days	himself	Indian National Congress
5		Shankarrao Chavan	Bhokar	27 October 1969	13 March 1972	2 years, 138 days	Vasantrao Naik	Indian National Congress
6		Vasantdada Patil		13 March 1972	21 February 1975	2 years, 345 days	Vasantrao Naik	Indian National Congress
(5)		Shankarrao Chavan	Bhokar	21 February 1975	17 May 1977	2 years, 85 days	himself	Indian National Congress
7		Sharad Pawar	Baramati	17 May 1977	7 March 1978	294 days	Vasantdada Patil	Indian National Congress
8		Nashikrao Tirpude		7 March 1978	18 July 1978	133 days	Vasantdada Patil	Indian National Congress (U)
(7)		Sharad Pawar	Baramati	18 July 1978	17 February 1980	1 year, 214 days	himself	Indian Congress (Socialist)
9		A. R. Antulay	Shrivardhan	9 June 1980	21 January 1982	1 year, 226 days	himself	Indian National Congress
10		Babasaheb Bhosale	Nehrunagar	21 January 1982	2 February 1983	1 year, 12 days	himself	Indian National Congress
(6)		Vasantdada Patil	Sangli	2 February 1983	3 June 1985	2 years, 121 days	himself	Indian National Congress
11		Shivajirao Patil Nilangekar	Nilanga	3 June 1985	12 March 1986	282 days	himself	Indian National Congress
(5)		Shankarrao Chavan	MLC	12 March 1986	26 June 1988	2 years, 106 days	himself	Indian National Congress
(7)		Sharad Pawar	Baramati	26 June 1988	4 March 1990	2 years, 364 days	himself	Indian National Congress
(7)		Sharad Pawar	Baramati	4 March 1990	25 June 1991	2 years, 364 days	himself	Indian National Congress
12		Sudhakarrao Naik	Pusad	25 June 1991	6 March 1993	1 year, 254 days	himself	Indian National Congress
(7)		Sharad Pawar	MLC	6 March 1993^{[§]}	14 March 1995	2 years, 8 days	himself	Indian National Congress
13		Gopinath Munde	Renapur	14 March 1995	1 February 1999	4 years, 218 days	Manohar Joshi	Bharatiya Janata Party
13		Gopinath Munde	Renapur	1 February 1999	18 October 1999	4 years, 218 days	Narayan Rane	Bharatiya Janata Party
14		Chhagan Bhujbal	MLC	18 October 1999	18 January 2003	3 years, 92 days	Vilasrao Deshmukh	Nationalist Congress Party
15		R. R. Patil	Tasgaon-Kavathe Mahankal	18 January 2003	1 November 2004	5 years, 325 days	Sushilkumar Shinde	Nationalist Congress Party
15		R. R. Patil	Tasgaon-Kavathe Mahankal	1 November 2004	8 December 2008	5 years, 325 days	Vilasrao Deshmukh	Nationalist Congress Party
16		Jayant Patil	Walva	8 December 2008	7 November 2009	334 days	Ashok Chavan	Nationalist Congress Party
(15)		R. R. Patil	Tasgaon-Kavathe Mahankal	7 November 2009	11 November 2010	4 years, 325 days	Prithviraj Chavan	Nationalist Congress Party
(15)		R. R. Patil	Tasgaon-Kavathe Mahankal	11 November 2010	28 September 2014	4 years, 325 days	Prithviraj Chavan	Nationalist Congress Party
17		Devendra Fadnavis	Nagpur South West	31 October 2014	12 November 2019	5 years, 12 days	himself	Bharatiya Janata Party
18		Eknath Shinde	Kopri-Pachpakhadi	28 November 2019	30 December 2019	32 days	Uddhav Thackeray	Shiv Sena
19		Anil Deshmukh	Katol	30 December 2019	5 April 2021	1 year, 96 days	Uddhav Thackeray	Nationalist Congress Party
20		Dilip Walse Patil	Ambegaon	5 April 2021	30 June 2022	1 year, 86 days	Uddhav Thackeray	Nationalist Congress Party
(17)		Devendra Fadnavis	Nagpur South West	30 June 2022	5 December 2024	4 years, 39 days	Eknath Shinde	Bharatiya Janata Party
(17)		Devendra Fadnavis	Nagpur South West	5 December 2024	incumbent	4 years, 39 days	himself	Bharatiya Janata Party

== Ministers of State ==
No.	Portrait	Deputy Minister (Constituency)	Term of office			Political party	Ministry	Minister	Chief Minister
No.	Portrait	Deputy Minister (Constituency)	From	To	Period	Political party	Ministry	Minister	Chief Minister
Deputy Minister of Home Affairs
Vacant (Urban) & (Rural)			23 November 2019	28 November 2019	5 days	NA	Fadnavis II	Devendra Fadnavis	Devendra Fadnavis
01 (Urban)		Satej Patil (MLC for Elected by Kolhapur Local Authorities Constituency No. 06 - Kolhapur District) (Legislative Council)	30 December 2019	29 June 2022	2 years, 181 days	Indian National Congress	Thackeray	Anil Deshmukh (2019- 2021); Dilip Walse-Patil (2021 - 2022)	Uddhav Thackeray
02 (Rural)		Shambhuraj Desai (MLA for Patan Constituency No. 261- Satara District) (Legislative Assembly)	30 December 2019	27 June 2022	2 years, 179 days	Shiv Sena	Thackeray	Anil Deshmukh (2019- 2021); Dilip Walse-Patil (2021 - 2022)	Uddhav Thackeray
03 (Rural)		Sanjay Bansode (MLA for Udgir Constituency No. 237- Latur District) (Legislative Assembly); Additional_Charge	27 June 2022	29 June 2022	2 days	Nationalist Congress Party	Thackeray	Anil Deshmukh (2019- 2021); Dilip Walse-Patil (2021 - 2022)	Uddhav Thackeray
Vacant (Urban) & (Rural)			30 June 2022	26 November 2024	2 years, 149 days	NA	Eknath	Eknath Shinde (2022 - 2022); Devendra Fadnavis (2022 - 2024)	Eknath Shinde
04 (Urban)		Yogesh Kadam (MLA for Dapoli Constituency No. 263- Ratnagiri District) (Legislative Assembly)	21 December 2024	Incumbent	1 year, 230 days	Shiv Sena (Shinde Group)	Fadnavis III	Devendra Fadnavis (2024 – Present)	Devendra Fadnavis
05 (Rural)		Pankaj Rajesh Bhoyar (MLA for Wardha Constituency No. 47- Wardha District) (Legislative Assembly)	21 December 2024	incumbent	1 year, 230 days	Bharatiya Janata Party	Fadnavis III	Devendra Fadnavis (2024 – Present)	Devendra Fadnavis

== Cabinet Ministers (Jails) 1977 to 1995 ==
17 May 1977 – 14 March 1995

No.	Portrait	Minister (Constituency)	Term of office			Political party	Ministry	Chief Minister
No.	Portrait	Minister (Constituency)	From	To	Period	Political party	Ministry	Chief Minister
Minister of Jails
Starting on 17 May 1977
01		Baburao Kale (MLA for Ghansavangi Jalna Constituency No. 190- Jalna District) (Legislative Assembly)	17 May 1977	07 March 1978	1 year, 294 days	Indian National Congress	Vasantdada I	Vasantdada Patil
02		Nashikrao Tirpude (MLA for Bhandara Constituency No. 61- Bhandara District) (Legislative Assembly) (Deputy Chief Minister)	07 March 1978	18 July 1978	133 days	Indian National Congress (U)	Vasantdada II	Vasantdada Patil
03		Shankarrao Chavan (MLA for Bhokar Constituency No. 85- Nanded District) (Legislative Assembly)	18 July 1978	17 February 1980	1 year, 214 days	Indian Congress (Socialist)	Pawar I	Sharad Pawar
04		Baburao Kale (MLA for Ghansavangi Jalna Constituency No. 190- Jalna District) (Legislative Assembly)	09 June 1980	21 January 1982	1 year, 226 days	Indian National Congress	Antulay	Abdul Rahman Antulay
05		Bhagwantrao Gaikwad (MLA for Kalameshwar Constituency No. 52- Nagpur District (Legislative Assembly)	21 January 1982	02 February 1983	1 year, 12 days	Indian National Congress	Bhosale	Babasaheb Bhosale
06		S. M. I. Aseer br /> (MLA for Ahmednagar South Constituency No. 223- Ahmednagar District (Legislative Assembly)	07 February 1983	05 March 1985	2 years, 26 days	Indian National Congress	Vasantdada III	Vasantdada Patil
07		Vasantdada Patil (MLA for Sangli Constituency No. 282 - Sangli District) (Legislative Assembly) (Chief Minister)	12 March 1985; 1960	03 June 1985; 1962	83 days	Indian National Congress	Vasantdada IV	Vasantdada Patil
08		Shivajirao Patil Nilangekar (MLA for Nilanga Constituency No. 238- Latur District) (Legislative Assembly) (Chief Minister)	03 June 1985	12 March 1986	282 days	Indian National Congress	Nilangekar	Shivajirao Patil Nilangekar
09		Shankarrao Chavan (MLC for Elected by MLAs Constituency No. 08 - Nanded District) (Legislative Council) (Chief Minister)	12 March 1986	26 June 1988	2 years, 106 days	Indian National Congress	Shankarrao II	Shankarrao Chavan
10		Padamsinh Patil (MLA for Osmanabad Constituency No. 242- Osmanabad District (Legislative Assembly)	26 June 1988	03 March 1990	1 year, 250 days	Indian National Congress	Pawar II	Sharad Pawar
11		Sharad Pawar (MLA for Baramati Constituency No. 201- Pune District) (Legislative Assembly) (Chief Minister)	04 March 1990	25 June 1991	1 year, 113 days	Indian National Congress	Pawar III	Sharad Pawar
12		Sudhakarrao Naik (MLA for Pusad Constituency No. 81- Yavatmal District) (Legislative Assembly) (Chief Minister)	25 June 1991	30 December 1991	188 days	Indian National Congress	Sudhakarrao	Sudhakarrao Naik
13		Arun Mehta (MLC for Elected by MLAs Constituency No. 05 - Mumbai Suburban District) (Legislative Council)	30 December 1991	22 February 1993	1 year, 54 days	Indian National Congress	Sudhakarrao	Sudhakarrao Naik
14		Sharad Pawar (MLA for Baramati Constituency No. 201- Pune District) (Legislative Assembly) (Chief Minister)	06 March 1993	14 March 1995	2 years, 8 days	Indian National Congress	Pawar IV	Sharad Pawar
Ending on 14 March 1995
