= Adik =

"Adik" or "Atik" means caribou in ojibwe and other related Algonquin languages

Adik is a surname. Notable people with the surname include:

- Govindrao Adik (1939–2015), Indian politician
- Ramrao Adik (1928–2007), Indian politician and lawyer

== See also ==
- Aşık
