= Ganeshpur, Bhandara =

Ganeshpur
- Village
- Interactive map of Ganeshpur
- Coordinates: 21.1513336°N 79.6434834°E
- Country: India
- State: Maharashtra
- District: Bhandara

Government
  - Type: Grampanchayat
  - Body: Grampanchayat Ganeshpur

Area
  - Total: 4 km^{2} (1.5 sq mi)
- Elevation: 244 m (801 ft)

Population (2011)
  - Total: 9,192
  - Density: 2,300/km^{2} (6,000/sq mi)
- Demonym: Ganeshpurwasi

Languages
  - Official: Marathi
- Time zone: UTC+5:30 (IST)
- PIN: 441904
- Telephone code: +917184
- Vehicle registration: MH-36

Ganeshpur, is a Village headed by Grampanchayat in Bhandara district in the state of Maharashtra, India. It is situated near of Wainganga River. The town is attached to the Bhandara City. The National Highway NH53 indicates the border of Ganeshpur. It is a Marathi-speaking Village. The name Ganeshpur is indicate god Ganapati name. The caste mostly found in Village is don baili teli and koshti also and other.

== Ethnic groups, language and religion ==
As of 2001 India census, Ganeshpur had a population of 8183. Males constitute 52% of the population and females 48%. Ganeshpur has an average literacy rate of 83%, higher than the national average of 59.5%: male literacy is 88%, and female literacy is 78%. In Ganeshpur, 10% of the population is under 6 years of age.

Year	Male	Female	Total Population	Change	Religion (%)							
Year	Male	Female	Total Population	Change	Hindu	Muslim	Christian	Sikhs	Buddhist	Jain	Other religions and persuasions	Religion not stated
2001	4249	3934	8183	-	87.132	0.244	1.723	0.049	9.947	0.196	0.709	0.000
2011	4688	4504	9192	0.123	80.265	0.838	1.610	0.022	16.754	0.120	0.076	0.315
