= Nashikrao Tirpude =

Indian politician

President of Maharashtra Pradesh Congress Committee
- In office 1978–1979
- Preceded by: Narendra Tidke
- Succeeded by: Ramrao Adik

1st Deputy Chief Minister of Maharashtra
- In office 5 March 1978 – 18 July 1978
- Governor: Sadiq Ali
- Chief Minister: Vasantdada Patil
- Preceded by: Position Established
- Succeeded by: Sundarrao Solanke

Deputy Leader of the House Legislative Assembly Maharashtra
- In office 5 March 1978 – 18 July 1978
- Succeeded by: Sundarrao Solanke

Cabinet Minister Of Home Affairs, Jails, Forests, and Cultural Affairs, Tribal Development, Tourism Government of Maharashtra
- In office 5 March 1978 – 18 July 1978

Member of Maharashtra Legislative Assembly
- In office 1968–1972
- Preceded by: Dada Dajibaji Dhote
- Succeeded by: Govind Ramji Shende
- Constituency: Bhandara

Personal details
- Born: 16 January 1921 Ganeshpur, Maharashtra, India
- Died: 19 May 2001 (aged 80)
- Citizenship: Indian
- Party: Indian National Congress
- Occupation: Politician

Nashikrao Khandatu Tirpude (16 January 1921 - 19 May 2002) was an Indian politician and first Deputy Chief Minister of the state of Maharashtra.

He belonged to Congress Party. When Indira Gandhi caused a split in the party in January 1978, he gave her support. After Congress (Indira) did well in the next month's assembly election and jointly formed the government with Congress (main faction), he became Deputy CM in the new coalition.

He was born on 16 January 1921 in Ganeshpur. He was a Dalit.

In 1986, he raised a demand for a separate state of Vidarbha and started Vidarbha movement. In 1995, he had a key role in the formation of All India Indira Congress. He was a member of working committee central parliamentary board and President of Maharashtra Pradesh Indira congress Party.

He died on 19 May 2002.
