= Bhosale ministry =

- Ministry of Maharashtra
- Date formed: 21 January 1982
- Date dissolved: 1 February 1983

People and organisations
- Governor: Om Prakash Mehra (1982); Idris Hasan Latif (1982-83)
- Chief Minister: Babasaheb Bhosale
- Member parties: Congress
- Status in legislature: Majority government
- Opposition party: JNP; INC(U)
- Opposition leader: Legislative Assembly: Babanrao Dhakne (JNP); Legislative Council: Ganesh Prabhakar Pradhan (INC(U)) (1982) Datta Meghe (INC(U) (1982-83)

History
- Election: 1980
- Legislature term: 5 years
- Predecessor: Antulay
- Successor: V. Patil III

Babasaheb Bhosale was appointed as the Chief Minister of Maharashtra on resignation of A. R. Antulay in January 1982. Bhosale had been law, labour, and transport minister in Antulay's cabinet. Bhosale's government served for about a year, until he was replaced by Vasantdada Patil in February 1983.

== List of ministers ==
Bhosale's cabinet was sworn in on 25 January 1982, and expanded on 11 October 1982.

| Portfolio | Minister | Took office | Left office | Party |
|---|---|---|---|---|
| Chief Minister: General Administration; Home Affairs; Information and Public Relations; Information Technology; Relief & Rehabilitation; Revenue; Co-operation; Mining Department; Urban Development; (End 11 October 1982): Cultural Affairs; Law and Judiciary; Command Area Development; Environment and Climate Change; Water Supply; Sanitation; Disaster Management; Majority Welfare Development; Departments or portfolios not allocated to any minister | Babasaheb Bhosale | 21 January 1982 | 1 February 1983 | INC |
| Cabinet Minister: Energy; Minority Development and Aukaf; Transport; Forests; Social Forestry | S. M. I. Aseer | 25 January 1982 | 1 February 1983 | INC |
| Cabinet Minister: Agriculture; Labour; Skill Development, Employment Entrepreneurship; Other Backward Bahujan Welfare; Jails | Bhagwantrao Gaikwad | 25 January 1982 | 1 February 1983 | INC |
| Cabinet Minister: Health and Family Welfare; Tourism; Animal Husbandry; Fisheries; Dairy Development; Horticulture; Slum Improvement; Vimukta Jati | Baliram Hiray | 25 January 1982 | 1 February 1983 | INC |
| Cabinet Minister: Public Works; (Excluding Public Undertakings): Tribal Welfare; Social Welfare; Special Backward Classes Welfare; Socially And Educationally Backward Classes; Soil and Water Conservation | Surupsingh Hirya Naik | 25 January 1982 | 1 February 1983 | INC |
| Cabinet Minister: School Education; Technical Education; Training; Sports and Youth Welfare; Rural Development; Woman and Child Development; Other Backward Classes; Nomadic Tribes | Smt.Sharadchandrika Suresh Patil | 25 January 1982 | 1 February 1983 | INC |
| Cabinet Minister: Irrigation; Special Assistance; Legislative Affairs; Marathi language; Public Works; (Including Public Undertakings) | Shivajirao Patil Nilangekar | 25 January 1982 | 1 February 1983 | INC |
| Cabinet Minister: Finance; Planning; Employment Guarantee Scheme; Food and Civil Supplies; Food and Drug Administration | V. Subramaniam | 25 January 1982 | 1 February 1983 | INC |
| Cabinet Minister: Housing; Ports Development | S. M. I. Aseer | 25 January 1982 | 11 October 1982 | INC |
| Cabinet Minister: Housing; Ports Development | Pratibha Patil | 11 October 1982 | 1 February 1983 | INC |
| Cabinet Minister: Urban Development; Ex. Servicemen Welfare; Marketing; State Excise; Prohibition | Babasaheb Bhonsle | 25 January 1982 | 11 October 1982 | INC |
| Cabinet Minister: Urban Development; Ex. Servicemen Welfare; Marketing; State Excise; Prohibition | Pratibha Patil | 11 October 1982 | 1 February 1983 | INC |
| Cabinet Minister: Medical Education; Higher Education | Baburao Kale | 11 October 1982 | 1 February 1983 | INC |
| Cabinet Minister: Industries | N. M. Kamble | {{{minister1_termstart}}} | 1 February 1983 | INC |
| Cabinet Minister: Textiles | Shantaram Gholap | 11 October 1982 | 1 February 1983 | INC |
| Cabinet Minister: Protocol, Earthquake Rehabilitation | Narendra Tidke | 11 October 1982 | 1 February 1983 | INC |
| Cabinet Minister: Khar Land Development | Shalini Patil | 11 October 1982 | 1 February 1983 | INC |
