= P. K. Sawant ministry =

- Ministry of Maharashtra
- Date formed: 25 November 1963
- Date dissolved: 4 December 1963

People and organisations
- Head of government: P. K. Sawant
- Member party: Indian National Congress

History
- Predecessor: Kannamwar ministry
- Successor: First Vasantrao Naik ministry

P. K. Sawant ministry was the ministry of Maharashtra headed by P. K. Sawant. Sawant was appointed interim Chief Minister of Maharashtra after the death of Marotrao Kannamwar. He held office for nine days, from 25 November 1963 to 4 December 1963, when he was replaced by Congress leader Vasantrao Naik. This ministry had the shortest tenure in Maharashtra until 2019, when Devendra Fadnavis's second government lasted for about three days.

== Council of Ministers ==
Name	Office	Took office	Left office
P. K. Sawant	Interim Chief Minister	25 November 1963	4 December 1963
