= Babasaheb Bhosale =

Indian politician (1921–2007)

9th Chief Minister of Maharashtra
- In office 21 January 1982 – 1 February 1983
- Preceded by: Abdul Rehman Antulay
- Succeeded by: Vasantdada Patil

Leader of the House of the Maharashtra Legislative Assembly
- In office 21 January 1982 – 1 February 1983
- Governor: Om Prakash Mehra; Idris Hasan Latif
- Deputy: Shalini Patil
- Speaker: Sharad Dighe
- Preceded by: Abdul Rehman Antulay
- Succeeded by: Vasantdada Patil

Leader of the House of the Maharashtra Legislative Council
- In office 9 June 1980 – 12 January 1982
- Deputy: Surupsingh Hirya Naik
- Chief Minister: Abdul Rehman Antulay
- Chairman: R. S. Gavai
- Preceded by: Sundarrao Solanke
- Succeeded by: Shivajirao Patil Nilangekar

Ministerial portfolios
- 1980–1982: Law and Judiciary; Labour; Transport; Marathi Language; Horticulture
- 1982: Urban Development
- 1982–1983: General Administration; Home Affairs; Information and Public Relations; Information Technology; Relief & Rehabilitation; Water Resources; Revenue; Co-operation; Mining Department; Cultural Affairs; Law and Judiciary; Command Area Development; Environment and Climate Change; Water Supply; Sanitation; Disaster Management; Majority Welfare Development

Member of the Maharashtra Legislative Assembly
- In office 1980–1985
- Preceded by: Liyaqat Hussain Ibarat Hussain
- Succeeded by: Kaka Thorat
- Constituency: Nehrunagar Assembly

Personal details
- Born: 15 January 1921 Satara, Bombay Presidency, British India
- Died: 6 October 2007 (aged 86) Mumbai, Maharashtra, India
- Party: Indian National Congress
- Children: 5
- Education: Shahaji Law College, Kolhapur

Babasaheb Anantrao Bhosale (15 January 1921 – 6 October 2007) was an Indian lawyer and politician who served as Chief Minister of Maharashtra from January 1982 until February 1983.

== Early life ==
Bhosale was born on 15 January 1921 in the Kaledhon Satara district of Maharashtra. An alumnus of the Shahaji Law College in Kolhapur, he passed the Bar-at-law examination at Lincoln's Inn, London in 1951 following which he practised in Satara as an advocate for a decade. Bhosale was imprisoned during 1941–42 for his participation in the freedom struggle. After relocating to Mumbai with his 5 children, Bhosale would go on to work at the high court and hold several notable political offices in the years to come.

== Electoral politics ==
In 1978, Bhosale contested and lost the Assembly election for the Nehrunagar (Vidhan Sabha constituency) in Kurla, Mumbai as a candidate of the Congress Party. In 1980, he was elected to the Maharashtra Vidhan Sabha from there and went on to become a minister and later chief minister during his first term as a Member of the Legislative Assembly. In the A.R. Antulay Ministry, Bhosale headed the law and judiciary portfolios before succeeding A.R. Antulay as Chief Minister of Maharashtra.

== Tenure as Chief Minister of Maharashtra ==
Bhosale was chosen as chief minister by Prime Minister Indira Gandhi in a move that snubbed senior Maratha leaders. Although he was Chief Minister for only 377 days, Bhosale's tenure is remembered for several bold decisions that he took. Among these were a scheme for free education for girls until matriculation, the creation of the Gadchiroli district and the inauguration of the Aurangabad bench of the Bombay High Court. Bhosale initiated several welfare measures for freedom fighters including a pension scheme for them and cracked down on a strike by policemen, dissolving the policemen's union that had the support of several senior Congress leaders. At the Vithoba Temple in Pandharpur, Bhosale's intervention led to the abolition of the system of 'Badwe' (priests) that had been a source of harassment to the devotees there. Bhosale was also well regarded for his wit and sense of humour.

Bhosale's term as Chief Minister was however also marked by dissension within the Congress Party. Bhosale's rule ended on 1 February 1983 following Vasantdada Patil's election to the chief ministership by legislators of the Congress Party.

Bhosale's cabinet had several people who went on to hold important offices later including Pratibha Patil who went on to become the President of India and Vilasrao Deshmukh who became the Chief Minister of Maharashtra.

== Family ==
Bhosale was the son-in-law of Tulsidas Jadhav, a freedom fighter and Rajya Sabha member who sided with Indira Gandhi when she split the Indian National Congress in 1969. His brother Shivajirao Bhosale was a vice-chancellor of Babasaheb Ambedkar Marathwada University. Bhosale's elder daughter, Mrs. Shanta Yadav retired as professor, his son Ashok is an entrepreneur, his daughter Saroj Bhosale is a business woman, his son Dilip was a judicial member of the Lokpal. His youngest son Dr. Rajan is one of India's foremost authorities and pioneers in the field of sexual medicine and sex education.

== Death ==
Bhosale died at the Bombay Hospital in Mumbai on 6 October 2007 at the age of 86.

| Preceded by Abdul Rehman Antulay | Chief Minister of Maharashtra; 21 January 1982 – 1 February 1983 | Succeeded by Vasantdada Patil |
