= Third Vasantdada Patil ministry =

- Ministry of Maharashtra
- Date formed: 2 February 1983
- Date dissolved: 9 March 1985

People and organisations
- Governor: Idris Hasan Latif
- Chief Minister: Vasantdada Patil
- Total no. of members: 15 Cabinet ministers (Incl. Chief Minister)
- Member parties: Congress
- Status in legislature: Majority government
- Opposition party: INC(S); JNP
- Opposition leader: Legislative Assembly: Sharad Pawar (INC(S)) Babanrao Dhakne (JNP); Legislative Council: Datta Meghe (INC(S)) (1983-84) Devidas Karale (INC(S)) (1984-85)

History
- Election: 1980
- Legislature term: 5 years
- Predecessor: Bhosale
- Successor: V. Patil IV

Vasantdada Patil was sworn in as Maharashtra chief minister for the third time in February 1983, on resignation of Babasaheb Bhosale. The third Patil ministry continued until 1985 legislative elections, after which Patil continued as chief minister with his fourth ministry.

== List of ministers ==
The ministry consisted of 15 cabinet ministers, including Patil.

Portfolio	Minister	Took office	Left office	Party
Chief Minister: General Administration; Home; Information and Public Relations; Employment Guarantee Scheme; Cooperation; Environment and Climate Change; Water supply; Sanitation; Earthquake Rehabilitation; Departments or portfolios not allocated to any minister.	Vasantdada Patil	2 February 1983	9 March 1985	INC
Deputy Chief Minister: Information Technology; Industries; Mining Department; Urban Development; Textiles; Disaster Management; Majority Welfare Development; Ex. Servicemen Welfare; Marketing; Transport; Soil and Water Conservation	Ramrao Adik	7 February 1983	5 March 1985	INC
Cabinet Minister: Labour; Minority Development and Aukaf; Jails; Rural Transport; Skill Development, Employment and Entrepreneurship	S. M. I. Aseer	7 February 1983	5 March 1985	INC
Cabinet Minister: Rural Development; Marathi language	Prataprao Baburao Bhosale	7 February 1983	5 March 1985	INC
Cabinet Minister: Public Works; (Excluding Public Undertakings): Food and Drug Administration (17 April 1984 – 5 March 1985); Other Backward Classes; Vimukta Jati; Other Backward Bahujan Welfare	Ramprasad Borade	7 February 1983	5 March 1985	INC
Cabinet Minister: Revenue; Relief & Rehabilitation; Legislative Affairs; Ports; Khar Land Development; Special Backward Classes Welfare	Shantaram Gholap	7 February 1983	5 March 1985	INC
Cabinet Minister: Energy; Prohibition; Excise; Socially And Educationally Backward Classes	Baliram Hiray	7 February 1983	5 March 1985	INC
Cabinet Minister: Housing; Slum Improvement; House Repairs; Protocol; Special Assistance	N. M. Kamble	7 February 1983	5 March 1985	INC
Cabinet Minister: Law and Judiciary; School Education; Higher and Technical Education; Dairy Development; Animal Husbandry; Woman and Child Development; Sports and Youth Welfare; Fisheries	Sudhakarrao Naik	7 February 1983	5 March 1985	INC
Cabinet Minister: Forest; Social Forestry; Tribal Welfare; Ports Development; Public Works; (Including Public Undertakings)	Surupsingh Hirya Naik	7 February 1983	5 March 1985	INC
Cabinet Minister: Food and Civil Supplies; Social Welfare	Pratibha Patil	7 February 1983	5 March 1985	INC
Cabinet Minister: Irrigation; Command Area Development; Nomadic Tribes	Shivajirao Patil Nilangekar	7 February 1983	5 March 1985	INC
Cabinet Minister: Finance; Planning; Culture Affairs; Tourism	Sushilkumar Shinde	7 February 1983	5 March 1985	INC
Cabinet Minister: Healh and Family Welfare; Medical Education; Food and Drugs Administration (07 February 1983 – 17 April 1984)	Lalita Rao	7 February 1983	5 March 1985	INC
Cabinet Minister: Agriculture; Horticulture; Panchayat Raj	Nanabhau Yambadwar	7 February 1983	5 March 1985	INC
