= Second Yashwantrao Chavan ministry (Bombay State) =

- Ministry of Maharashtra
- Date formed: 5 April 1957
- Date dissolved: 30 April 1960

People and organisations
- Governor: Sri Prakasa
- Chief Minister: Yashwantrao Chavan
- Total no. of members: 27; 15 Cabinet ministers (Incl. Chief Minister); 12 deputy ministers
- Member parties: Congress
- Status in legislature: Majority government

History
- Predecessor: Y. Chavan I (Bombay State)
- Successor: Y. Chavan I (Maharashtra)

Following the 1957 legislative elections, incumbent Bombay State chief minister Yashwantrao Chavan was sworn in for the second time in April 1957. Chavan served until 30 April 1960, when the State was dissolved and divided into the states of Maharashtra and Gujarat. After dissolution, Chavan continued as the chief minister of Maharashtra.

== Ministry ==
The initial ministry consisted of 15 cabinet ministers.

Portfolio	Minister	Took office	Left office	Party
Chief Minister; Departments not allocated to any minister	Yashwantrao Chavan	5 April 1957	30 April 1960	INC
Finance	Jivraj Mehta	12 April 1957	30 April 1960	INC
Revenue	R. U. Parikh	12 April 1957	30 April 1960	INC
Labour; Law	Shantilal Shah	12 April 1957	30 April 1960	INC
Public Health	Marotrao Kannamwar	12 April 1957	30 April 1960	INC
Agriculture; Aarey Milk Colony	Vasantrao Naik	12 April 1957	30 April 1960	INC
Prohibition; Village Panchayats; Cottage Industries	Ratubhai Adani	12 April 1957	30 April 1960	INC
Forests	B. G. Ghade	12 April 1957	30 April 1960	INC
Local Self-Government	Maneklal Chunilal Shah	12 April 1957	30 April 1960	INC
Planning; Development; Electricity; Industries	S. K. Wankhede	12 April 1957	30 April 1960	INC
Public Works	D. S. Desai	12 April 1957	30 April 1960	INC
Education	H. K. Desai	12 April 1957	30 April 1960	INC
Civil Supplies; Housing; Printing Press; Fisheries	S. G. Kazi	12 April 1957	30 April 1960	INC
Cooperation	T. S. Bharde	12 April 1957	30 April 1960	INC
Social Welfare; Rehabilitation	N. K. Tirpude	12 April 1957	30 April 1960	INC
