= Ramrao Adik =

Politician and lawyer (1928–2007)

Ramrao Wamanrao Adik

3rd Deputy Chief Minister of Maharashtra
- In office 2 February 1983 – 5 March 1985
- Governor: Idris Hasan Latif; Kona Prabhakara Rao
- Chief Minister: Vasantdada Patil
- Preceded by: Sundarrao Solanke (1978 -1980)
- Succeeded by: Gopinath Munde (1995)

Cabinet Minister Government of Maharashtra
- Minister: portfolios, including Finance, Urban Development, Housing, Industry, Law and Revenue,

Personal details
- Born: 24 December 1928 Maharashtra, India
- Died: 30 August 2007 (aged 78) Mumbai
- Citizenship: Indian
- Party: Indian National Congress
- Occupation: Politician

Ramrao Wamanrao Adik (24 December 1928 – 30 August 2007) was a Maratha politician and a notable lawyer from Maharashtra. He was a member of the Indian National Congress and the deputy chief minister of Maharashtra from 1984 to 1987. He died on 30 August 2007 in Mumbai following a brief illness. His younger brother, Govindrao Adik, was a Member of Parliament and a former Cabinet minister.

== Early childhood ==
Born in "Khanapur" village, of Shrirampur Taluka, in Ahmednagar District of Maharashtra on 24 December 1928, Ramrao spent most of his childhood on the sugarcane farm in "Khanapur" helping his father Wamanrao Adik. In a household of five siblings, Ramrao was the eldest and the most ambitious. He obtained his law degree at ILS Law College Pune in 1955 after which he went on to England to become a barrister. After returning from England, he practiced civil law in the Bombay High Court, where he quickly rose through the ranks as a lawyer and was elevated to the position of an advocate general. Since then his name became quite famous among political circles of Maharashtra.

== Political career ==
After being appreciated as a skilled lawyer by the then prime minister Indira Gandhi, he was asked to join the Indian National Congress. Ramrao Adik saw this as a good platform to serve the people of Maharashtra. In his pursuit for the welfare of the people of Maharashtra, he had also set up a small organization with a regional mandate for Marathi speaking people called Maharashtra Hitwardhini, which was later to be taken over by Bal Thackeray and become the present day Shiv Sena. Ramrao Adik also addressed several public rally's in support of Shiv Sena in its initial phases. Ramrao Adik had served as an Advocate General of Maharashtra, a Law Minister, and in a few years he would become the deputy chief minister of Maharashtra in 1984. He held several key portfolios, including Finance, Urban Development, Housing, Industry, and Revenue, in the state cabinet under various chief ministers in the following years. His most successful tenure was in 1991, when he served as a finance minister and drafted a surplus budget of Rupees 272 Crore/approx US$60 million, for the state of Maharashtra. His name emerges amongst the longest-serving Cabinet ministers in the State of Maharashtra, due to his neutral standpoints and diligent administration.

Adik had an interest in the field of education with a university in his name. He preferred to keep himself busy as a lawyer until his last years of life. "Being a Lawyer is what I love when I am not a politician" he quoted when asked about his preference of politics over legal practice by a judge of the Bombay High Court. The president of India Shrimati Pratibha Patil condoled his death and expressed grief over the loss of a noted statesman on his death. He was also honored with a full court reference by the Bombay High Court for his contribution to the field of law.

Preceded by Sundarrao Solanke	Deputy Chief Minister of Maharashtra; 2 February 1983 – 5 March 1985	Succeeded by Gopinath Munde
