= Second Fadnavis ministry =

Cabinet of Maharashtra, India in 2019

- 18th Cabinet of Maharashtra
- 2019
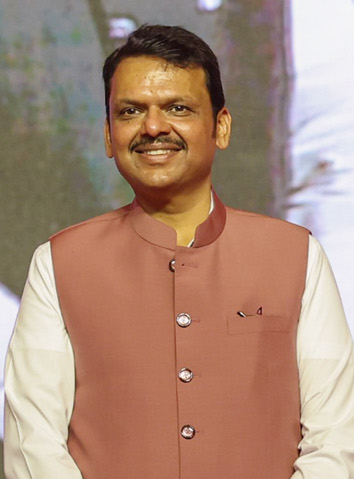
- Devendra Fadnavis
- Date formed: 23 November 2019
- Date dissolved: 26 November 2019

People and organisations
- Head of state: Gov. Bhagat Singh Koshyari
- Head of government: Devendra Fadnavis
- Deputy head of government: Ajit Pawar
- No. of ministers: 2
- Member parties: Bharatiya Janata Party; Nationalist Congress Party (Ajit Pawar faction) (Note: It was unclear how many legislators from Pawar's party supported the government. See "Political crisis and resignation" section for more.)
- Opposition party: Shiv Sena; Nationalist Congress Party (Sharad Pawar faction); Indian National Congress; Other smaller parties

History
- Election: 2019
- Legislature terms: 6 years (Council); 5 years (Assembly)
- Predecessor: First Devendra Fadnavis ministry
- Successor: Uddhav Thackeray ministry

Devendra Fadnavis was sworn in as the chief minister of Maharashtra for the second time on 23 November 2019. Alongside Fadnavis, Ajit Pawar was sworn in as the deputy chief minister. Before a Supreme Court-ordered no confidence motion could take place, Pawar resigned on 26 November. Fadnavis resigned shortly thereafter, making his second ministry the shortest Maharashtra ministry, surpassing P. K. Sawant's 1963 interim government, that had lasted for nine days.

== Government formation ==
In 2019 Maharashtra elections, the ruling National Democratic Alliance, consisting of Fadnavis' Bharatiya Janata Party, Shiv Sena, and other smaller parties, won a majority of seats. Fadnavis was seeking a second-term as chief minister, however, Shiv Sena insisted that the two parties share the tenure in accordance with a "50:50 formula". This meant that the parties would hold the chief ministerial office on a rotational basis. Following failure to reach an agreement and to form a government, Fadnavis resigned. As the Governor Bhagat Singh Koshiyari found out, after consultation with major political parties, that none of them was in a position to form a government, President's rule was imposed in the state.

After Fadnavis' resignation, it was expected that Shiv Sena would form a coalition government with Congress and Nationalist Congress Party. However, in early hours of 23 November 2019, President's rule was revoked and Fadnavis took oath as chief minister, alongside Pawar, who was sworn in as deputy chief minister.

=== Political crisis and resignation ===
Nationalist Congress Party chief and Ajit Pawar's uncle, Sharad Pawar, announced after the swearing-in, that Ajit Pawar's decision to join Fadnavis' ministry was not endorsed by his party. It was initially unclear if any other Nationalist Congress legislators were supportive of Ajit Pawar's decision. Eleven legislators were present at the early morning swearing in, however, three of them had clarified in a press conference on the same day that they had been misled.

Two days later, on 25 November, 162 legislators (Maharashtra Assembly has a total strength of 288), met in Mumbai, evincing that Fadnavis' government did not enjoy majority support. Simultaneously, a plea had been filed before the Supreme Court regarding the political crisis in the state. On 26 November 2016, the Supreme Court ruled that the Fadnavis government must prove its majority in the Assembly on the next day. Pawar resigned as deputy chief minister shortly thereafter, followed by Fadnavis.

Two days later, on 28 November, Uddhav Thackeray was appointed the chief minister, leading a coalition government.

== Council of ministers ==
Cabinet members
Portfolio	Minister	Took office	Left office	Party
Chief Minister; Other departments not allotted to any Minister	Devendra Fadnavis	23 November 2019	28 November 2019	BJP
Deputy Chief Minister	Ajit Pawar	23 November 2019	28 November 2019	NCP
