= Shankarrao Chavan =

Indian politician

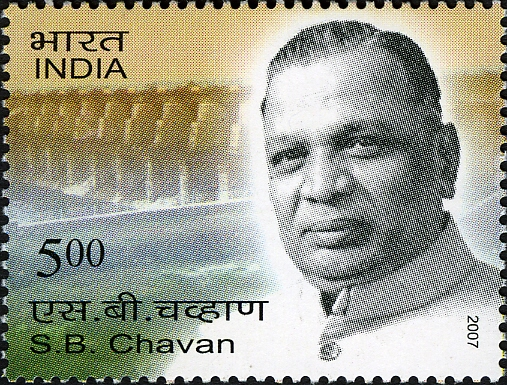
- Chavan on a 2007 stamp of India

Union Minister of Home Affairs
- In office 21 June 1991 – 16 May 1996
- Prime Minister: P. V. Narasimha Rao
- Preceded by: Chandra Shekhar
- Succeeded by: Murali Manohar Joshi
- In office 31 December 1984 – 12 March 1986
- Prime Minister: Rajiv Gandhi
- Preceded by: P. V. Narasimha Rao
- Succeeded by: P. V. Narasimha Rao

Union Minister of Finance
- In office 25 June 1988 – 2 December 1989
- Prime Minister: Rajiv Gandhi
- Preceded by: N. D. Tiwari
- Succeeded by: Madhu Dandavate

Union Minister of Defence
- In office 2 August 1984 – 30 December 1984
- Preceded by: Ramaswamy Venkataraman
- Succeeded by: P. V. Narasimha Rao

Union Minister of Education
- In office 8 August 1981 – 19 July 1984
- Preceded by: N. D. Tiwari
- Succeeded by: Prakash Chandra Sethi

Union Minister of Education
- In office 17 October 1980 – 8 August 1981
- Preceded by: B. Shankaranand
- Succeeded by: Sheila Kaul

Deputy Chairman of the Planning Commission
- In office 8 August 1981 – 18 July 1984
- Preceded by: N. D. Tiwari
- Succeeded by: Prakash Chandra Sethi

5th Chief Minister of Maharashtra
- In office 12 March 1986 – 26 June 1988
- Preceded by: Shivajirao Nilangekar Patil
- Succeeded by: Sharad Pawar
- In office 21 February 1975 – 16 May 1977
- Preceded by: Vasantrao Naik
- Succeeded by: Vasantdada Patil

President of the Bharat Scouts and Guides
- In office 1983–1998
- Preceded by: Jagjivan Ram
- Succeeded by: Rameshwar Thakur

Personal details
- Born: 14 July 1920 Paithan, Hyderabad State, British India
- Died: 26 February 2004 (aged 83) Mumbai, Maharashtra, India
- Party: Indian National Congress
- Relations: Ashok Chavan (son)

Shankarrao Bhavrao Chavan (14 July 1920 – 26 February 2004) was an Indian politician who served as the chief minister of Maharashtra twice from 1975 until 1977 and from 13 March 1986 until 26 June 1988.

== Early life and family ==
Chavan was born at Paithan Village, Aurangabad district, Maharashtra.

Chavan completed his Bachelor of Arts from Madras University and LL.B. from Osmania University. He started his career as an advocate. He initiated the Student's Movement and gave up practice of law during the 'Quit Court' Movement in the former Hyderabad State.

He was elected to Bombay State Assembly from Dharmabad in 1957 and to Maharashtra Vidhan Sabha from Dharmabad during the 1962 election and from Bhokar during 1967, 1972 and 1978 elections.

His son Ashok Chavan served as chief minister of Maharashtra. His daughter-in-law and Ashok Chavan's wife, Ameeta Ashokrao Chavan represented Bhokar in Maharashtra Vidhan sabha.

== Political career ==
=== Membership in legislative and parliament bodies ===
- Bombay State Legislative Council, 1956
- Maharashtra Legislative Assembly, 1960–80
- Lok Sabha, 1980–84 and 1985–86
- Maharashtra Legislative Council, 8 July 1986 – 21 October 1988
- Rajya Sabha from Maharashtra 28 October 1988 – 2 April 1990, April 1990 – April 1996 and April 1996 – April 2002
- Committee on Rules, Rajya Sabha, 1992–96

=== Leadership in Rajya Sabha ===
- Congress(I) Party in Rajya Sabha 2 July 1991 – 15 May 1996
- Leader of the House in Rajya Sabha from 2 July 1991 to 15 May 1996 elected to the Rajya Sabha in October 1988, re-elected in April 1990 and again in April 1996

=== Chief Minister ===
Shankarrao served as chief Minister of Maharashtra on two occasions.

- 21 February 1975 – 16 May 1977: This coincided with The Emergency declared by prime Minister, Indira Gandhi. Sanjay Gandhi, the son of the prime minister became the power behind the throne and Chavan had to meet Sanjay first to get an appointment with the prime minister
- 12 March 1986 – 26 June 1988

=== Union Cabinet Minister, Government of India ===
- Culture and Social Welfare & Education (HRD), 17 October 1980 – 8 August 1981
- Deputy Chairman, Planning Commission, 8 August 1981 to 18 July 1984
- Defence, 2 August 1984 to 30 December 1984
- Home, 31 December 1984 – 12 March 1986
- Finance 25 June 1988 – 2 December 1989
- Home, 21 June 1991 to 16 May 1996

== Positions ==
=== Chancellor ===
- Tilak Maharashtra University, Pune (Deemed University)

=== President ===
- The Bharat Scouts and Guides, New Delhi (April 1983 to November 1998)
- Maratha Mitra Mandal, New Delhi

=== Chairman ===
- Indian Institute of Public Administration (IIPA), New Delhi(1981-2004)
- Shri Sharda Bhavan Education Society, Nanded
- Committee on Human Resource Development, Parliament of India
- Ethics Committee, Rajya Sabha

=== Member ===
- Business Advisory Committee, Rajya Sabha
- General Purposes Committee, Rajya Sabha
- Executive Committee of the Indian Parliamentary Group
- Consultative Committee for the Ministry of Railways
- Parliamentary Affairs Committee of Congress(I) Party in Parliament
- All India Congress Committee (A.I.C.C.)
- Central Cooperative Union, Hyderabad

== In Memory ==
- Dr. Shankarrao Chavan Government Medical College & Hospital, Nanded
- MMM's Shankarrao Chavan Law College, Pune
- NWCMC's Dr.Shankarrao Chavan Auditorium, Near SGGS Stadium
- SBES's Shankarrao Chavan Memorial, VIP Road
- Shankarrao Chavan Chowk, Kamtha-Nanded
- Shankarrao Chavan Chowk, Chimegaon Nanded
- Dr.Shankarrao Chavan Garden & Library, CIDCO, नांदेड

Shankarrao Chavan Vidyalaya and Jr College, Khaparkheda dist. Nagpur

| Preceded by Jagjivan Ram | Presidents of the Bharat Scouts and Guides; 1983–1998 | Succeeded by Rameshwar Thakur |
| Preceded by Vasantrao Naik | Chief Minister of Maharashtra; 21 February 1975 – 17 May 1977 | Succeeded by Vasantdada Patil |
| Preceded by Shivajirao Nilangekar | Chief Minister of Maharashtra; 12 March 1986 – 26 June 1988 | Succeeded by Sharad Pawar |
| Preceded by V. P. Singh | Minister of Finance of India; 1988–1989 | Succeeded by Madhu Dandavate |
