= Shivajirao Patil Nilangekar =

Indian politician (1931–2020)

Shivajirao Patil

10th Chief Minister of Maharashtra
- In office 3 June 1985 – 6 March 1986
- Governor: Konda Madhava Reddy; Kona Prabhakara Rao
- Cabinet: Shivajirao Patil Ministry
- Preceded by: Vasantdada Patil
- Succeeded by: Shankarrao Chavan
- Additional Ministries: Home Affairs; Jails; Urban Development; Urban Land Ceiling; Information and Public Relations; Information Technology; Law and Judiciary; Water Supply; Sanitation; Other Backward Classes; Earthquake Rehabilitation; Majority Welfare Development; Marketing

Leader of the House in Maharashtra Legislative Assembly
- In office 4 June 1985 – 6 March 1986
- Speaker of Assembly: Shankarrao Jagtap
- Deputy: V. Subramanian
- Preceded by: Surupsingh Hirya Naik
- Succeeded by: V. Subramanian

Cabinet Minister Government of Maharashtra
- In office (1977-1978), (1980-1982), (1982-1983), (1983-1985)
- Chief Minister: Vasantdada Patil; A. R. Antulay; Babasaheb Bhosale

Member of Maharashtra Legislative Assembly
- In office (1962–1985), (1987–1995), (1999–2004), (2009–2014)
- Preceded by: Shripatrao Salunke (1957); Manikrao Jadhav (1995)
- Succeeded by: Diliprao Patil (son); Sambhaji Patil (grandson)
- Constituency: Nilanga

Personal details
- Born: 9 February 1931 Nilanga, Hyderabad State, British India
- Died: 5 August 2020 (aged 89) Pune, Maharashtra, India
- Citizenship: India
- Party: Indian National Congress
- Spouse: Sushilabai Patil
- Education: Rashtrasant Tukadoji Maharaj Nagpur University

Shivajirao Patil also known as Shivajirao Patil Nilangekar beacause he born in Nilanga also his Consituency name Nilanga Assembly constituency. In (9 February 1931 – 5 August 2020) he was a leader of Indian National Congress party who served as chief minister of Maharashtra.

He was chief minister from June 1985 to March 1986. His rule was the briefest of all chief ministers (apart from caretaker chief minister P K Sawant). He resigned after the Bombay High Court passed strictures against him regarding fraud in the MD examinations to help his daughter and her friend.

His daughter-in-law, Rupatai Patil Nilangekar, represented Latur (Lok Sabha constituency) for BJP from 2004 to 2009.

== Educational activities ==
Nilangekar established the Maharashtra Education Trust in 1968. Under the aegis of his education society around four senior colleges, twelve higher secondary schools and fifteen primary schools were established. Maharashtra Pharmacy College, Nilanga, was established in 1984. The Maharashtra Poly. (D.Pharmacy) Institute, Nilanga which was government aided, started in 1981 and was followed by the Maharashtra College of Engineering in 1983. His interests included reading, classical music, volleyball and table tennis. He was born in Nilanga, his home town.

== Death ==
Shivajirao died on 5 August 2020, at the age of 89 due to COVID-19 related complications during the COVID-19 pandemic in India.

Preceded by Vasantdada Patil	Chief Minister of Maharashtra; 3 June 1985 – 6 March 1986	Succeeded by Shankarrao Chavan
