= Vasantrao Naik =

Indian politician (1913–1979)

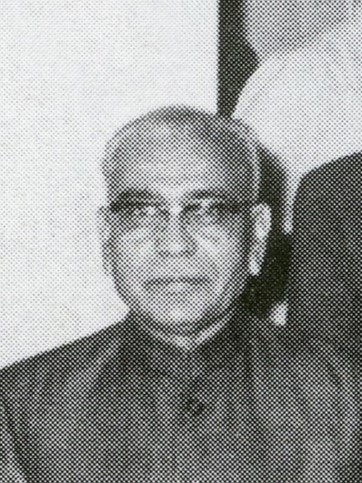

4th Chief Minister of Maharashtra
- In office 5 December 1963 – 20 February 1975
- Governor: Vijaya Laxmi Pandit; Hashmatrai Khubchand Chainani; P. V. Cherian; S. P. Kotval; Ali Yavar Jung
- Preceded by: P. K. Sawant
- Succeeded by: Shankarrao Chavan

Member of Parliament, Lok Sabha
- In office 25 March 1977 – 18 January 1980
- Preceded by: constituency established
- Succeeded by: Ghulam Nabi Azad
- Constituency: Washim

Member of Legislative Assembly Maharashtra
- In office 1962–1977
- Preceded by: Himself
- Succeeded by: Sudhakarrao Naik
- Constituency: Pusad

Member of Legislative Assembly Bombay
- In office 1957–1962
- Preceded by: Himself
- Succeeded by: Himself
- Constituency: Pusad

Member of legislative Assembly Madhya Pradesh
- In office 1952–1957
- Preceded by: Constituency established
- Succeeded by: Himself
- Constituency: Pusad

Personal details
- Born: 1 July 1913 Gahuli, Central Provinces and Berar, India
- Died: 18 August 1979 (aged 66) Singapore
- Party: Indian National Congress
- Spouse: Vatsala Vasantrao Naik
- Children: 2
- Education: Morris College, Nagpur; Nagpur University

Vasantrao Phulsingh Naik (1 July 1913 – 18 August 1979) was an Indian politician, social reformer and Pioneer of Green, White Revolution and Guarantee Employment Scheme. He served as the Chief Minister of Maharashtra from 1963 until 1975. He is the longest serving Chief Minister of Maharashtra.

== Biography ==
Vasantrao Naik was born on 1 July 1913 in a prosperous Banjara farmer family in a small village called Gahuli (near Pusad). Vasantrao Naik is considered the father of the Green Revolution, Panchayat Raj, White Revolution and Employment Guarantee Scheme.Vasantrao Naik gained fame across the country by reviving agricultural culture. He raised the profile of modern Indian agriculture and farmers. Naik was a Member of the Legislative Assembly of Madhya Pradesh from 1952 to 1957, of the bilingual Bombay State from 1957 to 1960 and of Maharashtra during 1960 to 1977. In 1952, he was appointed Deputy Minister for Revenue in the Government of Madhya Pradesh. He was made Minister for Cooperation in 1957 and, later, Minister for Agriculture in the Government of Bombay State. From 1960 to 1963, he was Minister for Revenue in the government of Maharashtra.

After the death of Marotrao Kannamwar, Naik was elected Chief Minister of Maharashtra, a post which he held for more than eleven years between 1963 and 1975. He is considered the father of the Green Revolution in Maharashtra. The industrialization of Maharashtra is largely the legacy of his progressive industrial policies. He was also elected to the 6th Lok Sabha from Washim in 1977. Prominent Writer Eknathrao Pawar has described Vasantrao Naik as the 'Agricultural Saint of Modern India'. President Pranab Mukherjee praised Naik in 2013, saying, "Vasantrao Naik is a great son of Mother India."

== Death ==
Vasantrao Phulsing Naik died in Singapore on 18 August 1979.

== Legacy ==
The Shri Vasantrao Naik Government Medical College in Yavatmal city of Maharashtra state and Vasantrao Naik Marathwada Agriculture University Parbhani, Maharashtra state was named in his honour.

His nephew Sudhakarrao Naik also became Chief Minister of Maharashtra. Many journalists and experts of political studies attribute the rise of right wing party Shiv Sena in the 1970s to his policy of building up the Shiv Sena as a counterweight to the communist-led labour unions in Mumbai.

His birth anniversary is celebrated as Krushi Din (1 July Agricultural day) by Maharashtra Government.

The 2015 Marathi film Mahanayak Vasant Tu, starring Chinmay Mandlekar, is his biopic. A junction/ chowk/ bus stop in Tardeo, Mumbai is named after Vasantrao Naik.
