= Marotrao Kannamwar =

Indian politician

Dadasaheb Kannamwar

2nd Chief Minister of Maharashtra
- In office 20 November 1962 – 24 November 1963
- Preceded by: Yashwantrao Chavan
- Succeeded by: P. K. Sawant

Member of the Maharashtra Legislative Assembly
- In office 1960–1963
- Preceded by: Himself in Bombay LA
- Succeeded by: Wamanrao Gaddamwar
- Constituency: Saoli

Member of the Bombay Legislative Assembly
- In office 1956–1960
- Preceded by: Himself in Madhya Pradesh LA
- Succeeded by: Himself in Maharashtra LA
- Constituency: Saoli

Member of the Madhya Pradesh Legislative Assembly
- In office 1952–1956
- Preceded by: Office established
- Succeeded by: Himself in Bombay LA
- Constituency: Saoli

Personal details
- Born: 10 January 1900 Saoli, Berar Province, British India
- Died: 24 November 1963 (aged 63) Bombay, Maharashtra, India
- Party: Indian National Congress
- Spouse: GM (Tai) Kannamwar

Marotrao Shambshio Kannamwar alias Dadasaheb (10 January 1900 – 24 November 1963) was born in Beldar Community and he was an Indian politician who served as Chief Minister of Maharashtra from 20 November 1962 to 24 November 1963.

He represented Saoli Assembly constituency in Madhya Padesh Legislative Assembly from 1952 to 1956, in Bombay Legislative Assembly from 1956 to 1960 and in the Maharashtra Legislative Assembly from 1960 to 1963. He was re-elected from Saoli in 1962 elections to the Maharashtra Legislative Assembly. He died while in office on 24 November 1963.

== Legacy ==
- Kannamwar Nagar in Vikhroli (East), Mumbai was named after him.
- KDK College of Engineering, Nagpur is named in his honour.
- Congress-Bhavan in Chandrapur renamed after Ex- CM of Maharashtra.
- Also, on NH-6 beyond Kondhali (50+ km from Nagpur) a detour from the NH 6, a village Kannamwargram is named after the great leader.
- Government Granted school in Village Surbodi, Chandrapur district is named after him (Karmavir Kannamwar Vidhyalaya Surbodi High School) which was founded by Shriram Dhote in the year 1982.
- Government Medical College, Chandrapur

Source: https://www.icbse.com It is on the road towards Bangdapur. Bangdapur is on the Kondhali-Wardha connecting road.

Political offices
Preceded by Yashwantrao Chavan	Chief Minister of Maharashtra; 20 November 1962 – 24 November 1963	Succeeded by Vasantrao Naik
