= P. K. Sawant =

Indian politician

3rd Chief Minister of Maharashtra
- Acting
- In office 25 November 1963 – 4 December 1963
- Preceded by: Marotrao Kannamwar
- Succeeded by: Vasantrao Naik

Member of Maharashtra Legislative Assembly
- In office 1962–1978
- Preceded by: Constituency created
- Succeeded by: Rajaram Shinde
- Constituency: Chiplun

Parashuram Krishnaji Sawant (also known as Balasaheb Sawant) (9 January 1905 – 29 October 2000) was an Indian politician. He served as 3rd (acting) Chief Minister of Maharashtra from 25 November 1963 to 4 December 1963, in an interim capacity for nine days following the death of his predecessor, Marotrao Kannamwar.

Prior to becoming Chief Minister, Sawant was the state's home minister under Kannamwar. He represented Vengurla in the erstwhile Bombay Legislative Assembly from 1952 to 1957, and Chiplun in the Maharashtra Legislative Assembly from 1962 to 1978.

The agricultural university at Dapoli was renamed Dr. Balasaheb Sawant Konkan Krishi Vidyapeeth after Sawant in 2001.

== See also ==
- P.K. Sawant on Marathi Wikipedia
