= Ministry of Animal Husbandry (Maharashtra) =

Government agency in Maharashtra, India

Ministry of Animal Husbandry Department Government of Maharashtra
- मंत्रालय पशुसंवर्धन विभाग, महाराष्ट्र शासन
- Seal of the state of Maharashtra

Department overview
- Jurisdiction: (India) Maharashtra
- Headquarters: Mantralay, Mumbai
- Minister responsible: Pankaja Munde, Cabinet Minister
- Deputy Minister responsible: Vacant, TBD since 29 June 2022, Minister of State
- Department executive: Anoop Kumar, IAS, Secretary
- Parent department: Government of Maharashtra
- Website: ahd.maharashtra.gov.in

The Ministry of Department of Animal Husbandry is a department of Government of Maharashtra to regulate animal husbandry in Maharashtra.

The department is headed by the cabinet level minister. The Minister of State assists cabinet minister. Pankaja Munde is current Minister for Husbandry.

== Head office ==
Minister of Animal Husbandry मंत्री पशुसंवर्धन विभाग
- Emblem of India

- Flag of India

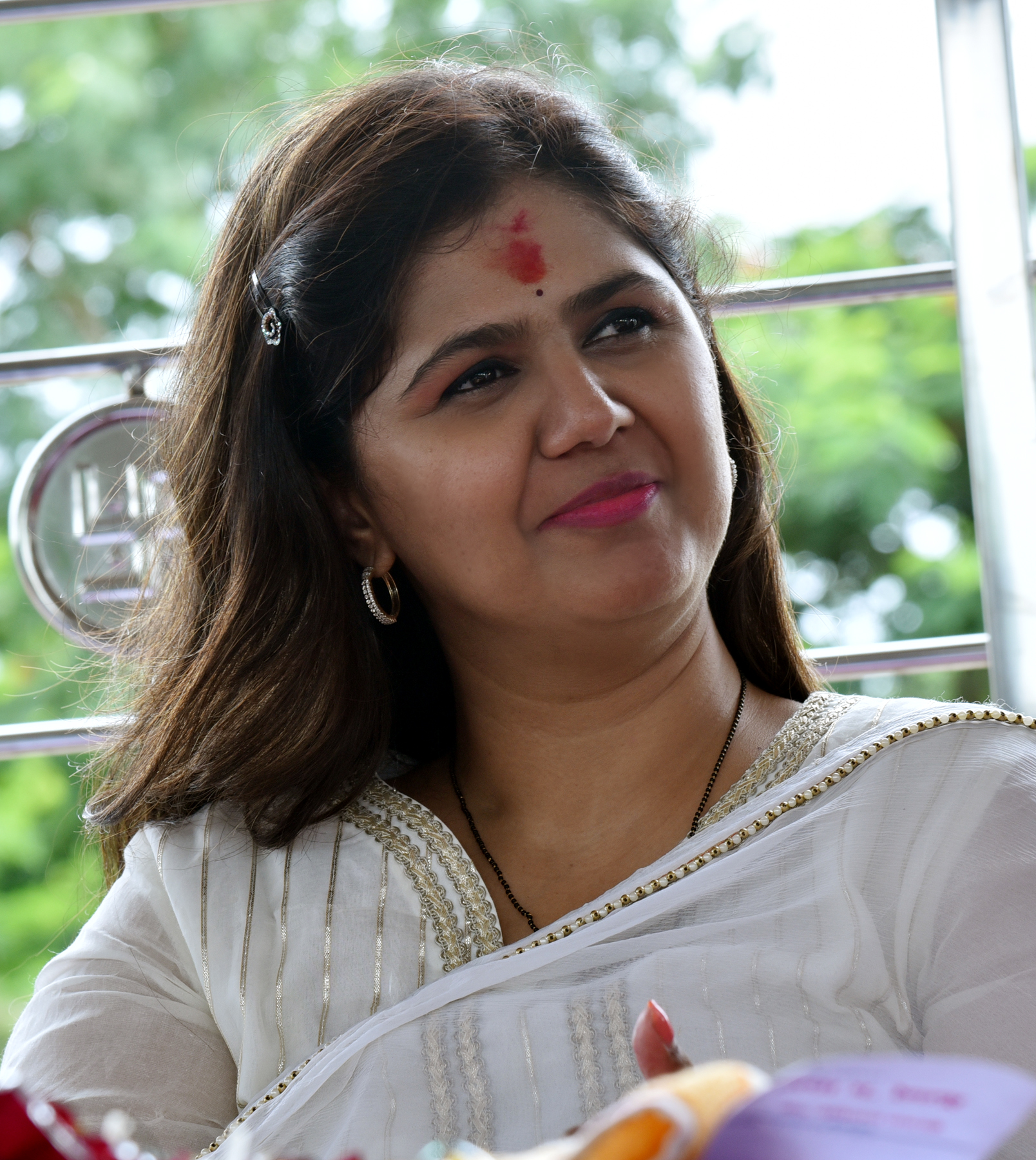
- Incumbent; Pankaja Munde since 21 December 2024
- Ministry of Animal Husbandry (Maharashtra)
- Style: The Honourable
- Abbreviation: Cabinet Minister
- Member of: State Cabinet
- Reports to: Chief Minister, Maharashtra Legislature
- Seat: Mantralaya, Mumbai
- Appointer: Governor on the advice of the Chief Minister
- Term length: 5 years
- Precursor: Devendra Fadnavis; (2024- 2024)
- Inaugural holder: Balasaheb Desai; (1960-1962)
- Formation: 1 May 1960
- Deputy: Vacant, TBD; since 29 June 2022

== Cabinet Ministers ==
No.	Portrait	Minister (Constituency)	Term of office			Political party	Ministry	Chief Minister
No.	Portrait	Minister (Constituency)	From	To	Period	Political party	Ministry	Chief Minister
Minister of Animal Husbandry Department
01		Parashuram Krishnaji Sawant (MLA for Chiplun Constituency No. 265- Ratnagiri District) (Legislative Assembly)	01 May 1960	07 March 1962	1 year, 310 days	Indian National Congress	Yashwantrao I	Yashwantrao Chavan
02		Balasaheb Desai (MLA for Patan Constituency No. 261- Satara District) (Legislative Assembly)	08 March 1962	19 November 1962	256 days	Indian National Congress	Yashwantrao II	Yashwantrao Chavan
03		Keshavrao Sonawane (MLA for Latur Constituency No. 235- Latur District) (Legislative Assembly)	20 November 1962	24 November 1963	1 year, 4 days	Indian National Congress	Kannamwar l	Marotrao Kannamwar
04		Parashuram Krishnaji Sawant (MLA for Chiplun Constituency No. 265- Ratnagiri District) (Legislative Assembly) (Interim Chief Minister)	25 November 1962	04 December 1963	9 days	Indian National Congress	Sawant	Parashuram Krishnaji Sawant
05		Narendra Mahipati Tidke (MLA for Savner Constituency No. 49- Nagpur District) (Legislative Assembly)	05 December 1963	01 March 1967	3 years, 86 days	Indian National Congress	Vasantrao I	Vasantrao Naik
06		Gopalrao Bajirao Khedkar (MLA for Akot Constituency No. 28- Akola District) (Legislative Assembly)	01 March 1967	27 October 1969	2 years, 240 days	Indian National Congress	Vasantrao II	Vasantrao Naik
07		Narendra Mahipati Tidke (MLA for Savner Constituency No. 49- Nagpur District) (Legislative Assembly)	27 October 1969	13 March 1972	2 years, 138 days	Indian National Congress	Vasantrao II	Vasantrao Naik
08		Shankarrao Chavan (MLA for Bhokar Constituency No. 85- Nanded District) (Legislative Assembly)	13 March 1972	04 April 1973	1 year, 32 days	Indian National Congress	Vasantrao III	Vasantrao Naik
09		M. B. Popat (MLA for Dhobitalao Constituency No. 160- Mumbai City District) (Legislative Assembly)	04 April 1973	17 Match; 1974	347 days	Indian National Congress	Vasantrao III	Vasantrao Naik
10		Yashwantrao Mohite (MLA for Karad South Constituency No. 260- Satara District) (Legislative Assembly)	17 Match; 1974	21 February 1975	341 days	Indian National Congress	Vasantrao III	Vasantrao Naik
11		Shankarrao Bajirao Patil (MLA for Indapur Constituency No. 220- Pune District (Legislative Assembly)	21 February 1975	16 April 1977	2 years, 54 days	Indian National Congress	Shankarrao I	Shankarrao Chavan
12		Vasantdada Patil (MLA for Sangli Constituency No. 282- Sangli District) (Legislative Assembly) (Chief Minister)	17 April 1977	07 March 1978	1 year, 324 days	Indian National Congress	Vasantdada I	Vasantdada Patil
13		Sudhakarrao Naik (MLA for Pusad Constituency No. 81- Yavatmal District) (Legislative Assembly)	07 March 1978	18 July 1978	133 days	Indian National Congress	Vasantdada II	Vasantdada Patil
14		Narayan Dnyandev Patil (MLA for Kolhapur Constituency No. 273- Kolhapur District (Legislative Assembly)	18 July 1978	17 February 1980	1 year, 214 days	Peasants and Workers Party of India	Pawar I	Sharad Pawar
15		Shivajirao Patil Nilangekar (MLA for Nilanga Constituency No. 238- Latur District) (Legislative Assembly)	09 June 1980	21 January 1982	1 year, 226 days	Indian National Congress	Antulay	Abdul Rahman Antulay
16		Baliram Waman Hiray (MLA for Dabhadi Constituency No. 74- Nashik District) (Legislative Assembly)	21 January 1982	02 February 1983	1 year, 12 days	Indian National Congress	Bhosale	Babasaheb Bhosale
17		Sudhakarrao Naik (MLA for Pusad Constituency No. 81- Yavatmal District) (Legislative Assembly)	07 February 1983	05 March 1985	2 years, 26 days	Indian National Congress	Vasantdada III	Vasantdada Patil
18		Vasantdada Patil (MLA for Sangli Constituency No. 282- Sangli District) (Legislative Assembly) (Chief Minister)	12 March 1985	03 June 1985	83 days	Indian National Congress	Vasantdada IV	Vasantdada Patil
19		Anantrao Thopte (MLA for Bhor Constituency No. 203- Pune District (Legislative Assembly)	03 June 1985	12 March 1986	282 days	Indian National Congress	Nilangekar	Shivajirao Patil Nilangekar
20		Bhagwantrao Gaikwad (MLA for Kalameshwar Constituency No. 52- Nagpur District (Legislative Assembly)	12 March 1986	26 June 1988	2 years, 106 days	Indian National Congress	Shankarrao II	Shankarrao Chavan
21		Datta Meghe (MLC for Elected by MLAs Constituency No. 15 - Wardha District) (Legislative Council)	26 June 1988	03 March 1990	1 year, 250 days	Indian National Congress	Pawar II	Sharad Pawar
22		Vilasrao Deshmukh (MLA for Latur City Constituency No. 235- Latur District) (Legislative Assembly)	03 March 1990	25 January 1991	328 days	Indian National Congress	Pawar III	Sharad Pawar
23		Anantrao Thopte (MLA for Bhor Constituency No. 203- Pune District (Legislative Assembly)	25 January 1991	25 June 1991	151 days	Indian National Congress	Pawar III	Sharad Pawar
24		Vilasrao Balkrishna Patil Undhalkar (MLA for Karad South Constituency No. 260- Satara District) (Legislative Assembly)	25 June 1991	30 December 1991	188 days	Indian National Congress	Sudhakarrao	Sudhakarrao Naik
25		Madhukarrao Pichad (MLA for Akole Constituency No. 213- Ahmednagar District (Legislative Assembly)	06 March 1993	18 November 1994	1 year, 257 days	Indian National Congress	Pawar IV	Sharad Pawar
26		Narayan Rane (MLA for Malvan Constituency No. 269- Sindhudurg District) (Legislative Assembly)	14 March 1995	01 February 1999	3 years, 324 days	Shiv Sena	Joshi	Manohar Joshi
27		Radhakrishna Vikhe Patil (MLA for Shirdi Constituency No. 218- Ahmednagar District) (Legislative Assembly)	01 February 1999	11 May 1999	99 days	Shiv Sena	Rane	Narayan Rane
28		Narayan Rane (MLA for Malvan Constituency No. 269- Sindhudurg District) (Legislative Assembly) (Chief Minister)	11 May 1999	17 October 1999	159 days	Shiv Sena	Rane	Narayan Rane
29		Vilasrao Deshmukh (MLA for Latur City Constituency No. 235- Latur District) (Legislative Assembly) (Chief Minister)	19 October 1999	27 October 1999	8 days	Indian National Congress	Deshmukh I	Vilasrao Deshmukh
30		Anand Devkate (MLA for Solapur South Constituency No. 251- Solapur District (Legislative Assembly)	27 October 1999	16 January 2003	3 years, 81 days	Indian National Congress	Deshmukh I	Vilasrao Deshmukh
31		Anand Devkate (MLA for Solapur South Constituency No. 251- Solapur District (Legislative Assembly)	18 January 2003	01 November 2004	1 year, 295 days	Indian National Congress	Sushilkumar	Sushilkumar Shinde
32		Vilasrao Deshmukh (MLA for Latur City Constituency No. 235- Latur District) (Legislative Assembly) (Chief Minister)	01 November 2004	09 November 2004	8 days	Indian National Congress	Deshmukh II	Vilasrao Deshmukh
33		Anees Ahmed (MLA for Nagpur Central Constituency No. 55- Nagpur District (Legislative Assembly)	09 November 2004	01 December 2008	4 years, 22 days	Indian National Congress	Deshmukh II	Vilasrao Deshmukh
34		Ravisheth Patil (MLA for Pen Constituency No. 191- Raigad District) (Legislative Assembly)	08 December 2008	06 November 2009	333 days	Indian National Congress	Ashok I	Ashok Chavan
35		Nitin Raut (MLA for Nagpur North Constituency No. 57- Nagpur District) (Legislative Assembly)	07 November 2009	10 November 2010	1 year, 3 days	Indian National Congress	Ashok II	Ashok Chavan
36		Madhukarrao Chavan (MLA for Tuljapur Constituency No. 241 - Dharashiv District Also Previously Known Osmanabad District (Legislative Assembly)	11 November 2010	07 June 2014	3 years, 238 days	Indian National Congress	Prithviraj	Prithviraj Chavan
37		Abdul Sattar Abdul Nabi (MLA for Sillod Constituency No. 104- Chhatrapati Sambhaji Nagar District Also Previously Known Aurangabad District (Legislative Assembly)	07 June 2014	26 September 2014	81 days	Indian National Congress	Prithviraj	Prithviraj Chavan
38		Eknath Khadse (MLA for Muktainagar Constituency No. 20- Jalgaon District) (Legislative Assembly)	31 October 2014	04 June 2016	1 year, 217 days	Bharatiya Janata Party	Fadnavis I	Devendra Fadnavis
39		Pankaja Munde (MLA for Parli Constituency No. 233- Beed District) (Legislative Assembly)	04 June 2016	08 July 2016	34 days	Bharatiya Janata Party	Fadnavis I	Devendra Fadnavis
40		Mahadev Jankar (MLC for Elected by MLAs Constituency No. 30 - Parbhani District) (Legislative Council)	08 July 2016	12 November 2019	3 years, 127 days	Rashtriya Samaj Paksha	Fadnavis I	Devendra Fadnavis
41		Devendra Fadnavis (MLA for Nagpur South West Constituency No. 52- Nagpur District) (Legislative Assembly) (Chief_Minister); In Charge	23 November 2019	28 November 2019	5 days	Bharatiya Janata Party	Fadnavis II	Devendra Fadnavis
42		Balasaheb Thorat (MLA for Sangamner Constituency No. 217- Ahmednagar District) (Legislative Assembly)	28 November 2019	30 December 2019	32 days	Indian National Congress	Thackeray	Uddhav Thackeray
43		Sunil Chhatrapal Kedar (MLA for Savner Constituency No. 49- Nagpur District) (Legislative Assembly)	30 December 2019	29 June 2022	2 years, 181 days	Indian National Congress	Thackeray	Uddhav Thackeray
44		Eknath Shinde (MLA for Kopri-Pachpakhadi Constituency No. 147- Thane District) (Legislative Assembly) (Chief Minister); In Charge	30 June 2022	14 August 2022	45 days	Shiv Sena (2022–present)	Eknath	Eknath Shinde
45		Radhakrishna Vikhe Patil (MLA for Shirdi Constituency No. 218- Ahmednagar District) (Legislative Assembly)	14 August 2022	26 November 2024	2 years, 135 days	Bharatiya Janata Party	Eknath	Eknath Shinde
46		Devendra Fadnavis (MLA for Nagpur South West Constituency No. 52- Nagpur District) (Legislative Assembly) (Chief_Minister); In Charge	05 December 2024	21 December 2024	16 days	Bharatiya Janata Party	Fadnavis III	Devendra Fadnavis
47		Pankaja Munde (MLC for Elected by MLAs Constituency No. 01 - Beed District) (Legislative Council)	21 December 2024	Incumbent	1 year, 281 days	Bharatiya Janata Party	Fadnavis III	Devendra Fadnavis

== Ministers of State ==
No.	Portrait	Deputy Minister (Constituency)	Term of office			Political party	Ministry	Minister	Chief Minister
No.	Portrait	Deputy Minister (Constituency)	From	To	Period	Political party	Ministry	Minister	Chief Minister
Deputy Minister of Animal Husbandry
Vacant			23 November 2019	28 November 2019	5 days	NA	Fadnavis II	Devendra Fadnavis	Devendra Fadnavis
01		Dattatray Vithoba Bharne (MLA for Indapur Constituency No. 200- Pune District (Legislative Assembly)	30 December 2019	29 June 2022	2 years, 181 days	Nationalist Congress Party	Thackeray	Sunil Chhatrapal Kedar	Uddhav Thackeray
Vacant			30 June 2022	26 November 2024'	2 years, 149 days	NA	Eknath	Eknath Shinde (2022 - 2022); Radhakrishna Vikhe Patil (2022 – 2024)	Eknath Shinde
Vacant			21 December 2024	incumbent	1 year, 281 days	NA	Fadnavis III	Pankaja Munde (2024 – Present)	Devendra Fadnavis

== Animal husbandry in Maharashtra ==
Many farmers in Maharashtra depend on animal husbandry for their livelihood. In addition to supplying milk, meat, eggs, wool, their castings (dung) and hides, animals, mainly bullocks, are the major source of power for both farmers and drayers. Thus, animal husbandry plays an important role in the rural economy. The national gross value of output from this sector was 8,123 billion Rupees in FY 2015–16.

== Organisational structure ==
Department is further divided into following sub-departments for ease of administration.

- Maharashtra Veterinary State Council, Nagpur
- Maharashtra Livestock Development Board Akola
- Sheep & Goat Development Corporation, Pune

=== Maharashtra Animal and Fishery Sciences University ===
Maharashtra Animal and Fishery Sciences University is an agriculture state university headquartered from Nagpur, Maharashtra, India. It was established under The Maharashtra Animal and Fishery Sciences University Act, 1998. It was officially established on 3 December 2000 by carving seven colleges out of the other four state agriculture universities in Maharashtra.

== See also ==
- Ministry of General Administration (Maharashtra)
- Ministry of Information and Public Relations (Maharashtra)
- Ministry of Information Technology (Maharashtra)
- Ministry of Law and Judiciary (Maharashtra)
- Ministry of Home Affairs (Maharashtra)
- Ministry of Public Works (Excluding Public Undertakings) (Maharashtra)
- Ministry of Public Works (Including Public Undertakings) (Maharashtra)
- Ministry of Finance (Maharashtra)
- Ministry of Planning (Maharashtra)
- Ministry of Revenue (Maharashtra)
- Ministry of State Excise (Maharashtra)
- Ministry of Special Assistance (Maharashtra)
- Ministry of Social Justice (Maharashtra)
- Ministry of Forests Department (Maharashtra)
- Ministry of Environment and Climate Change (Maharashtra)
- Ministry of Energy (Maharashtra)
- Ministry of Water Resources (Maharashtra)
- Ministry of Command Area Development (Maharashtra)
- Ministry of Public Health (Maharashtra)
- Ministry of Housing (Maharashtra)
- Ministry of Urban Development (Maharashtra)
- Ministry of Rural Development (Maharashtra)
- Ministry of Labour (Maharashtra)
- Ministry of Co-operation (Maharashtra)
- Ministry of Marketing (Maharashtra)
- Ministry of Transport (Maharashtra)
- Ministry of Industries (Maharashtra)
- Ministry of Mining Department (Maharashtra)
- Ministry of Textiles (Maharashtra)
- Ministry of Protocol (Maharashtra)
- Ministry of Tourism (Maharashtra)
- Ministry of Cultural Affairs (Maharashtra)
- Ministry of Marathi Language (Maharashtra)
- Ministry of Water Supply (Maharashtra)
- Ministry of Soil and Water Conservation (Maharashtra)
- Ministry of Parliamentary Affairs (Maharashtra)
- Ministry of Sanitation (Maharashtra)
- Ministry of Woman and Child Development (Maharashtra)
- Ministry of School Education (Maharashtra)
- Ministry of Medical Education (Maharashtra)
- Ministry of Higher and Technical Education (Maharashtra)
- Ministry of Skill Development and Entrepreneurship (Maharashtra)
- Ministry of Sports and Youth Welfare (Maharashtra)
- Ministry of Ex. Servicemen Welfare (Maharashtra)
- Ministry of Agriculture (Maharashtra)
- Ministry of Food, Civil Supplies and Consumer Protection (Maharashtra)
- Ministry of Food and Drug Administration (Maharashtra)
- Ministry of Animal Husbandry Department (Maharashtra)
- Ministry of Dairy Development (Maharashtra)
- Ministry of Horticulture (Maharashtra)
- Ministry of Fisheries Department (Maharashtra)
- Ministry of Ports Development (Maharashtra)
- Ministry of Disaster Management (Maharashtra)
- Ministry of Relief & Rehabilitation (Maharashtra)
- Ministry of Khar Land Development (Maharashtra)
- Ministry of Earthquake Rehabilitation (Maharashtra)
- Ministry of Employment Guarantee (Maharashtra)
- Ministry of Minority Development and Aukaf (Maharashtra)
- Ministry of Majority Welfare Development (Maharashtra)
- Ministry of Tribal Development (Maharashtra)
- Ministry of Vimukta Jati (Maharashtra)
- Ministry of Nomadic Tribes (Maharashtra)
- Ministry of Other Backward Classes (Maharashtra)
- Ministry of Other Backward Bahujan Welfare (Maharashtra)
- Ministry of Special Backward Classes Welfare (Maharashtra)
- Ministry of Socially and Educationally Backward Classes (Maharashtra)
