= Ministry of Food, Civil Supplies and Consumer Protection (Maharashtra) =

Government department of Maharashtra, India

Ministry of Food, Civil Supplies and Consumer Protection, Government of Maharashtra
- अन्न, नागरी पुरवठा आणि ग्राहक व्यवहार मंत्रालय महाराष्ट्र शासन
- Seal of the state of Maharashtra

Ministry overview
- Jurisdiction: (India) Maharashtra
- Headquarters: Mantralay, Mumbai
- Minister responsible: Chhagan Bhujbal, Cabinet Minister for Food, Civil Supplies and Consumer Protection
- Deputy Minister responsible: Yogesh Kadam
- Ministry executive: Vikas Patil (IAS)
- Parent department: Government of Maharashtra

The Ministry of Food, Civil Supplies and Consumer Protection is a ministry of the Government of Maharashtra. The ministry is responsible for consumer protection and regulating food and civil supply issues in Maharashtra.

== Head office ==
Minister of Food, Civil Supplies and Consumer Protection अन्न, नागरी पुरवठा आणि ग्राहक व्यवहार मंत्री
- Emblem of India

- Flag of India

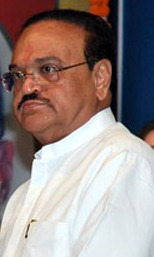
- Incumbent; Chhagan Bhujbal since 23 May 2025
- Ministry of Food, Civil Supplies and Consumer Protection (Maharashtra)
- Style: The Honourable
- Abbreviation: Cabinet Minister
- Member of: State Cabinet
- Reports to: Chief Minister, Maharashtra Legislature
- Seat: Mantralaya, Mumbai
- Appointer: Governor On The Advice Of The Chief Minister
- Term length: 5 years
- Precursor: Ajit Pawar (2025-2025)(Additional Charge)
- Inaugural holder: Homi J. H. Taleyarkhan (1960-1962)
- Formation: 1 May 1960
- Deputy: Yogesh Kadam

== Cabinet Ministers ==
No.	Portrait	Minister (Constituency)	Term of office			Political party	Ministry	Chief Minister
No.	Portrait	Minister (Constituency)	From	To	Period	Political party	Ministry	Chief Minister
Minister of Food, Civil Supplies and Consumer Protection
01		Sultan. G. Kazi (MLC for Elected by Local Authorities Constituency No. 14 - Ahmednagar District) (Legislative Council)	01 May 1960	07 March 1962	1 year, 310 days	Indian National Congress	Yashwantrao I	Yashwantrao Chavan
02		Homi J. H. Taleyarkhan (MLC for Elected by MLAs Constituency No. 22 - Mumbai Suburban District) (Legislative Council)	08 March 1962	19 November 1962	256 days	Indian National Congress	Yashwantrao II	Yashwantrao Chavan
03		Homi J. H. Taleyarkhan (MLC for Elected by MLAs Constituency No. 22 - Mumbai Suburban District) (Legislative Council)	20 November 1962	24 November 1963	1 year, 4 days	Indian National Congress	Kannamwar l	Marotrao Kannamwar
04		P. K. Sawant (MLA for Chiplun Constituency No. 265- Ratnagiri District) (Legislative Assembly) (Interim Chief Minister)	25 November 1962	04 December 1963	9 days	Indian National Congress	Sawant	P. K. Sawant
05		Homi J. H. Taleyarkhan (MLC for Elected by MLAs Constituency No. 22 - Mumbai Suburban District) (Legislative Council)	05 December 1963	01 March 1967	3 years, 86 days	Indian National Congress	Vasantrao I	Vasantrao Naik
06		Keshavrao Sonawane (MLA for Latur Constituency No. 235- Latur District) (Legislative Assembly)	01 March 1967	27 October 1969	2 years, 240 days	Indian National Congress	Vasantrao II	Vasantrao Naik
07		Shankarrao Chavan (MLA for Bhokar Constituency No. 85- Nanded District) (Legislative Assembly)	27 October 1969	13 March 1972	2 years, 138 days	Indian National Congress	Vasantrao II	Vasantrao Naik
08		Vasantrao Patil (MLA for Sangli Constituency No. 282- Sangli District) (Legislative Assembly)	13 March 1972	04 April 1973	1 year, 32 days	Indian National Congress	Vasantrao III	Vasantrao Naik
09		Anant Namjoshi (MLA for Girgaon Constituency No. 185- Mumbai City District) (Legislative Assembly)	04 April 1973	17 Match; 1974	347 days	Indian National Congress	Vasantrao III	Vasantrao Naik
10		Vasantrao Naik (MLA for Pusad Constituency No. 81- Yavatmal District) (Legislative Assembly) (Chief Minister)	17 Match; 1974	21 February 1975	341 days	Indian National Congress	Vasantrao III	Vasantrao Naik
11		Ratnappa Kumbhar (MLA for Shirol Constituency No. 280- Kolhapur District (Legislative Assembly)	21 February 1975	16 April 1977	2 years, 54 days	Indian National Congress	Shankarrao I	Shankarrao Chavan
12		Shankarrao Gedam (MLA for Katol Constituency No. 48- Nagpur District) (Legislative Assembly)	17 April 1977	07 March 1978	1 year, 324 days	Indian National Congress	Vasantdada I	Vasantdada Patil
13		Yashwantrao Mohite (MLA for Karad South Constituency No. 260- Satara District) (Legislative Assembly)	07 March 1978	18 July 1978	133 days	Indian National Congress	Vasantdada II	Vasantdada Patil
14		Jagannathrao Jadhav (MLA for Sangameshwar Constituency No. 173- Ratnagiri District (Legislative Assembly)	18 July 1978	17 February 1980	1 year, 214 days	Janata Party	Pawar I	Sharad Pawar
15		Bhikajirao Jijaba Khatal-Patil (MLA for Sangamner Constituency No. 217- Ahmednagar District) (Legislative Assembly)	09 June 1980	21 January 1982	1 year, 226 days	Indian National Congress	Antulay	Abdul Rahman Antulay
16		V. Subramaniam (MLA for South Mumbai Constituency No. 121- Mumbai City District) (Legislative Assembly)	21 January 1982	02 February 1983	1 year, 12 days	Indian National Congress	Bhosale	Babasaheb Bhosale
17		Pratibha Patil (MLA for Jalgaon City Constituency No. 13- Jalgaon District) (Legislative Assembly)	07 February 1983	05 March 1985	2 years, 26 days	Indian National Congress	Vasantdada III	Vasantdada Patil
18		Surupsingh Hirya Naik (MLA for Navapur Constituency No. 04- Nandurbar District) (Legislative Assembly)	12 March 1985	03 June 1985	83 days	Indian National Congress	Vasantdada IV	Vasantdada Patil
19		Shivajirao Deshmukh (MLC for Elected by MLAs Constituency No. 18 - Sangli District) (Legislative Council)	03 June 1985	12 March 1986	282 days	Indian National Congress	Nilangekar	Shivajirao Patil Nilangekar
20		V. Subramanian (MLA for South Mumbai Constituency No. 121- Mumbai City District) (Legislative Assembly)	12 March 1986	26 June 1988	2 years, 106 days	Indian National Congress	Shankarrao II	Shankarrao Chavan
21		Datta Meghe (MLC for Elected by MLAs Constituency No. 15 - Wardha District) (Legislative Council)	26 June 1988	03 March 1990	1 year, 250 days	Indian National Congress	Pawar II	Sharad Pawar
22		Surupsingh Hirya Naik (MLA for Navapur Constituency No. 04- Nandurbar District) (Legislative Assembly)	03 March 1990	25 January 1991	328 days	Indian National Congress	Pawar III	Sharad Pawar
23		Jawaharlal Darda (MLC for Elected by MLAs Constituency No. 19 - Yavatmal District) (Legislative Council)	25 January 1991	25 June 1991	151 days	Indian National Congress	Pawar III	Sharad Pawar
24		Jawaharlal Darda (MLC for Elected by MLAs Constituency No. 19 - Yavatmal District) (Legislative Council)	25 June 1991	22 February 1993	1 year, 242 days	Indian National Congress	Sudhakarrao	Sudhakarrao Naik
25		Sarawan Parate (MLC for Elected by MLAs Constituency No. 14 - Kolhapur District) (Legislative Council)	06 March 1993	14 March 1995	2 years, 8 days	Indian National Congress	Pawar IV	Sharad Pawar
26		Shobha Fadnavis (MLA for Saoli Constituency No. 82- Chandrapur district) (Legislative Assembly)	14 March 1995	01 February 1999	3 years, 324 days	Bharatiya Janata Party	Joshi	Manohar Joshi
27		Shobha Fadnavis (MLA for Saoli Constituency No. 82- Chandrapur district) (Legislative Assembly)	01 February 1999	11 May 1999	99 days	Bharatiya Janata Party	Rane	Narayan Rane
28		Mahadeo Shivankar (MLA for Amgaon Constituency No. 66- Gondia district) (Legislative Assembly)	11 May 1999	17 October 1999	159 days	Bharatiya Janata Party	Rane	Narayan Rane
29		Chhagan Bhujbal (MLC for Elected by MLAs Constituency No. 09 - Mumbai City District) (Legislative Council) (Deputy Chief Minister)	19 October 1999	27 October 1999	8 days	Nationalist Congress Party	Deshmukh I	Vilasrao Deshmukh
30		Datta Meghe (MLC for Elected by MLAs Constituency No. 15 - Wardha District) (Legislative Council)	27 October 1999	16 January 2003	3 years, 81 days	Nationalist Congress Party	Deshmukh I	Vilasrao Deshmukh
31		Sushilkumar Shinde (MLA for Solapur South Constituency No. 251- Solapur District) (Legislative Assembly) (Chief Minister)	18 January 2003	01 November 2004	1 year, 295 days	Indian National Congress	Sushilkumar	Sushilkumar Shinde
32		R. R. Patil (MLA for Tasgaon-Kavathe Mahankal Constituency No. 287- Sangli District) (Legislative Assembly) (Deputy Chief Minister)	01 November 2004	09 November 2004	8 days	Nationalist Congress Party	Deshmukh II	Vilasrao Deshmukh
33		baba siddiqui (MLA for bandra east Constituency No. 194- Mumbai) (Legislative Assembly)	09 November 2004	01 December 2008	4 years, 22 days	Nationalist Congress Party	Deshmukh II	Vilasrao Deshmukh
34		Ramesh Bang (MLA for Hingna Constituency No. 50- Nagpur District) (Legislative Assembly)	08 December 2008	06 November 2009	333 days	Nationalist Congress Party	Ashok I	Ashok Chavan
35		Anil Deshmukh (MLA for Katol Constituency No. 48- Nagpur District) (Legislative Assembly)	07 November 2009	10 November 2010	1 year, 3 days	Nationalist Congress Party	Ashok II	Ashok Chavan
36		Balasaheb Thorat (MLA for Sangamner Constituency No. 217- Ahmednagar District) (Legislative Assembly)	11 November 2010	26 September 2014	3 years, 319 days	Nationalist Congress Party	Prithviraj	Prithviraj Chavan
37		Vishnu Savara (MLA for Vikramgad Constituency No. 129- Palghar District) (Legislative Assembly)	31 October 2014	04 December 2014	34 days	Bharatiya Janata Party	Fadnavis I	Devendra Fadnavis
38		Girish Bapat (MLA for Kasba Peth Constituency No. 215- Pune District (Legislative Assembly)	05 December 2014	04 June 2019	4 years, 181 days	Bharatiya Janata Party	Fadnavis I	Devendra Fadnavis
39		Devendra Fadnavis (MLA for Nagpur South West Constituency No. 52- Nagpur District) (Legislative Assembly) (Chief_Minister); Additional Charge	04 June 2019	16 June 2019	12 days	Bharatiya Janata Party	Fadnavis I	Devendra Fadnavis
40		Sambhaji Patil Nilangekar (MLA for Nilanga Constituency No. 238- Latur District (Legislative Assembly)	16 June 2019	12 November 2019	149 days	Bharatiya Janata Party	Fadnavis I	Devendra Fadnavis
41		Devendra Fadnavis (MLA for Nagpur South West Constituency No. 52- Nagpur District) (Legislative Assembly) (Chief_Minister); In Charge	23 November 2019	28 November 2019	5 days	Bharatiya Janata Party	Fadnavis II	Devendra Fadnavis
42		Jayant Patil (MLA for Islampur Constituency No. 283- Sangli District) (Legislative Assembly)	28 November 2019	30 December 2019	32 days	Nationalist Congress Party	Thackeray	Uddhav Thackeray
43		Chhagan Bhujbal (MLA for Yevla Constituency No. 119- Nashik District) (Legislative Assembly)	30 December 2019	29 June 2022	2 years, 181 days	Nationalist Congress Party	Thackeray	Uddhav Thackeray
44		Eknath Shinde (MLA for Kopri-Pachpakhadi Constituency No. 147- Thane District) (Legislative Assembly) (Chief Minister); In Charge	30 June 2022	14 August 2022	45 days	Shiv Sena (2022–present)	Eknath	Eknath Shinde
45		Ravindra Chavan (MLA for Dombivli Constituency No. 143- Thane District) (Legislative Assembly)	14 August 2022	14 July 2023	334 days	Bharatiya Janata Party	Eknath	Eknath Shinde
46		Chhagan Bhujbal (MLA for Yevla Constituency No. 119- Nashik District) (Legislative Assembly)	14 July 2023	26 November 2024	1 year, 135 days	Nationalist Congress Party	Eknath	Eknath Shinde
47		Devendra Fadnavis (MLA for Nagpur South West Constituency No. 52- Nagpur District) (Legislative Assembly) (Chief_Minister); In Charge	05 December 2024	21 December 2024	16 days	Bharatiya Janata Party	Fadnavis III	Devendra Fadnavis
48		Dhananjay Munde (MLA for Parli Constituency No. 233- Beed District) (Legislative Assembly)	21 December 2024	04 March 2025	73 days	Nationalist Congress Party	Fadnavis III	Devendra Fadnavis
49		Devendra Fadnavis (MLA for Nagpur South West Constituency No. 52- Nagpur District) (Legislative Assembly) (Chief_Minister); Additional Charge	04 March 2025	06 March 2025	2 days	Bharatiya Janata Party	Fadnavis III	Devendra Fadnavis
50		Ajit Pawar (MLA for Baramati Constituency No. 201- Pune District (Legislative Assembly) (Deputy Chief Minister)	07 March 2025	23 May 2025	78 days	Nationalist Congress Party	Fadnavis III	Devendra Fadnavis
51		Chhagan Bhujbal (MLA for Yevla Constituency No. 119- Nashik District) (Legislative Assembly)	23 May 2025	incumbent	1 year, 108 days	Nationalist Congress Party	Fadnavis III	Devendra Fadnavis

== Ministers of State ==
No.	Portrait	Deputy Minister (Constituency)	Term of office			Political party	Ministry	Minister	Chief Minister
No.	Portrait	Deputy Minister (Constituency)	From	To	Period	Political party	Ministry	Minister	Chief Minister
Deputy Minister of Food, Civil Supplies and Consumer Affairs
Vacant			23 November 2019	28 November 2019	5 days	NA	Fadnavis II	Devendra Fadnavis	Devendra Fadnavis
01		Vishwajeet Kadam (MLA for Palus-Kadegaon Constituency No. 285- Sangli District) (Legislative Assembly)	30 December 2019	29 June 2022	2 years, 181 days	Indian National Congress	Thackeray	Chhagan Bhujbal	Uddhav Thackeray
Vacant			30 June 2022	26 November 2024	2 years, 149 days	NA	Eknath	Eknath Shinde (2022 - 2022); Ravindra Chavan (2022 - 2023); Chhagan Bhujbal (2023 – 2024)	Eknath Shinde
02		Yogesh Kadam (MLA for Dapoli Constituency No. 263- Ratnagiri District) (Legislative Assembly)	21 December 2024	Incumbent	1 year, 261 days	Shiv Sena (Shinde Group)	Fadnavis III	Dhananjay Munde (2024 – 2025); Devendra Fadnavis Additional Charge (2025 – 2025); Ajit Pawar (2025 – 2025); Chhagan Bhujbal (2025 – Present)	Devendra Fadnavis

== List of principal secretary ==
Pranab (2000-2004)

== History ==
Food and Civil Supplies department came into existence in March 1965. Before 1965, Food and Civil Supply came under Agriculture, Food and Cooperation Department.

== Jurisdiction ==
Ministry looks after Maharashtra. Department works in alignment with the Essential Commodities Act, 1955.

== Consumer protection ==
Department is further divided into following offices for administrative purpose.

State and District level consumer protection :

- Consumer Welfare Advisory Committee
- District Consumer Protection Councils
- State Consumer Protection Council
- Jurisdiction of the State Commission & District Forum
- District Fora
- Circuit Bench
- State Commission

Composition of State Commission
The State Commission consists of

- five Members
1. one President (sitting or retired High Court Judge)
2. one is judicial member (sitting or retired District Court Judge)
3. and one is lady member.
4. two members with adequate knowledge of consumer protection laws
