= Ministry of Revenue (Maharashtra) =

Maharashtra government ministry responsible for Revenue

Ministry of Revenue Government of Maharashtra
- मंत्रालय महसूल विभाग महाराष्ट्र शासन
- Seal of the state of Maharashtra

- Building of Administrative Headquarters of Mumbai

Agency overview
- Formed: 1960; 66 years ago
- Preceding agency: Department of Revenue
- Jurisdiction: Chief Minister of Maharashtra
- Headquarters: Mantralaya, Mumbai
- Annual budget: State budget of Government of Maharashtra
- Minister responsible: Chandrashekhar Bawankule, Cabinet Minister
- Deputy Ministers responsible: Yogesh Kadam, Minister of State
- Agency executives: Mr. Manukumar Shrivastav (IAS), Principal Secretary; Mr. Krishna Kenga, Joint Secretary; Mr. Kiran Wadte, Deputy Secretary
- Website: revenue.maharashtra.gov.in/default.aspx

The Ministry of Revenue is a ministry of the Government of Maharashtra. It is responsible for preparing annual plans for the development of Maharashtra state.

The ministry is headed by a Cabinet level by Chandrashekhar Bawankule, current minister of revenue.

== Head office ==
Minister of Revenue महसूल मंत्री
- Emblem of India

- Flag of India

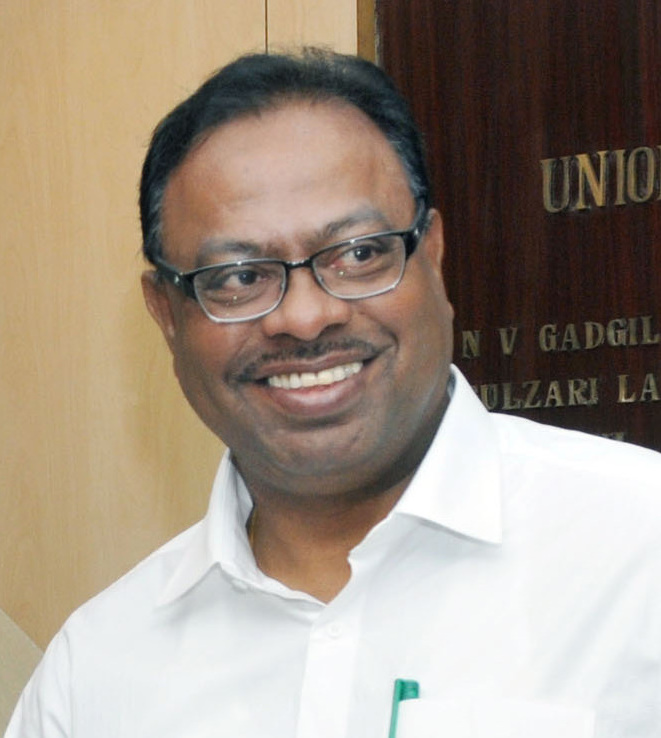
- Incumbent; Chandrashekhar Bawankule since 21 December 2024
- Ministry of Revenue (Maharashtra)
- Style: The Honourable
- Abbreviation: RM
- Member of: State Cabinet
- Reports to: Chief Minister,& Maharashtra Legislature
- Seat: Mantralaya, Mumbai
- Appointer: Governor on the advice of the Chief Minister
- Term length: 5 years
- Precursor: Devendra Fadnavis (2024-2024)
- Inaugural holder: Vasantrao Naik (1960-1962)
- Formation: 1 May 1960
- Deputy: Yogesh Kadam

== Cabinet ministers ==
#	Portrait	Minister	Constituency	Term of office			Chief Minister	Party
1		Vasantrao Naik	Pusad	1 May 1960	20 November 1962	3 years, 207 days	Yashwantrao Chavan	Indian National Congress
1		Vasantrao Naik	Pusad	20 November 1962	24 November 1963	3 years, 207 days	Marotrao Kannamwar	Indian National Congress
2		P. K. Sawant	Chiplun	25 November 1963	5 December 1963	10 days	himself	Indian National Congress
(1)		Vasantrao Naik	Pusad	5 December 1963	1 March 1967	3 years, 86 days	himself	Indian National Congress
(2)		P. K. Sawant	Chiplun	1 March 1967	13 March 1972	5 years, 12 days	Vasantrao Naik	Indian National Congress
3		Shankarrao Chavan	Bhokar	13 March 1972	21 February 1975	2 years, 345 days	Vasantrao Naik	Indian National Congress
4		Rafiq Zakaria	MLC	21 February 1975	17 May 1977	2 years, 85 days	Shankarrao Chavan	Indian National Congress
5		Madhukarrao Chaudhari	Raver	17 May 1977	18 July 1978	1 year, 62 days	Vasantdada Patil	Indian National Congress
6		Uttamrao Patil	Parola	18 July 1978	17 February 1980	1 year, 214 days	Sharad Pawar	Janata Party
7		Shalini Patil		9 June 1980	21 January 1982	1 year, 226 days	A. R. Antulay	Indian National Congress
8		Babasaheb Bhosale	Nehrunagar	21 January 1982	2 February 1983	1 year, 12 days	himself	Indian National Congress
9		Shantaram Gholap	Murbad	2 February 1983	3 June 1985	2 years, 121 days	Vasantdada Patil	Indian National Congress
10		Sudhakarrao Naik	Pusad	3 June 1985	12 March 1986	282 days	Shivajirao Patil Nilangekar	Indian National Congress
11		Vilasrao Deshmukh	Latur City	12 March 1986	26 June 1988	2 years, 106 days	Shankarrao Chavan	Indian National Congress
12		Prabha Rau	Pulgaon	26 June 1988	4 March 1990	1 year, 251 days	Sharad Pawar	Indian National Congress
(10)		Sudhakarrao Naik	Pusad	4 March 1990	25 June 1991	1 year, 113 days	Sharad Pawar	Indian National Congress
13		Shankarrao Kolhe		25 June 1991	30 December 1991	188 days	Sudhakarrao Naik	Indian National Congress
14		Chhagan Bhujbal	Mazgaon	30 December 1991	6 March 1993	1 year, 66 days	Sudhakarrao Naik	Indian National Congress
(11)		Vilasrao Deshmukh	Latur City	6 March 1993	14 March 1995	2 years, 8 days	Sharad Pawar	Indian National Congress
15		Sudhir Joshi	MLC	14 March 1995	15 June 1996	1 year, 93 days	Manohar Joshi	Shiv Sena
16		Narayan Rane	Malvan	15 June 1996	1 February 1999	3 years, 125 days	Manohar Joshi	Shiv Sena
16		Narayan Rane	Malvan	1 February 1999	18 October 1999	3 years, 125 days	himself	Shiv Sena
17		Ashok Chavan	Bhokar	18 October 1999	18 January 2003	3 years, 92 days	Vilasrao Deshmukh	Indian National Congress
18		Sushilkumar Shinde	Solapur South	18 January 2003	1 November 2004	1 year, 288 days	himself	Indian National Congress
(11)		Vilasrao Deshmukh	Latur City	1 November 2004	16 August 2005	288 days	himself	Indian National Congress
(16)		Narayan Rane	Malvan	16 August 2005	6 December 2008	3 years, 112 days	Vilasrao Deshmukh	Indian National Congress
19		Patangrao Kadam	Palus-Kadegaon	8 December 2008	7 November 2009	334 days	Ashok Chavan	Indian National Congress
(16)		Narayan Rane	Kudal	7 November 2009	11 November 2010	1 year, 4 days	Ashok Chavan	Indian National Congress
20		Balasaheb Thorat	Sangamner	11 November 2010	28 September 2014	3 years, 321 days	Prithviraj Chavan	Indian National Congress
21		Eknath Khadse	Muktainagar	31 October 2014	4 June 2016	1 year, 217 days	Devendra Fadnavis	Bharatiya Janata Party
22		Devendra Fadnavis	Nagpur South West	4 June 2016	8 July 2016	34 days	himself	Bharatiya Janata Party
23		Chandrakant Patil	MLC	8 July 2016	12 November 2019	3 years, 127 days	Devendra Fadnavis	Bharatiya Janata Party
(20)		Balasaheb Thorat	Sangamner	28 November 2019	30 June 2022	2 years, 214 days	Uddhav Thackeray	Indian National Congress
24		Eknath Shinde	Kopri-Pachpakhadi	30 June 2022	9 August 2022	40 days	himself	Shiv Sena (2022–present)
25		Radhakrishna Vikhe Patil	Shirdi	9 August 2022	26 November 2024	2 years, 109 days	Eknath Shinde	Bharatiya Janata Party
(22)		Devendra Fadnavis	Nagpur South West	5 December 2024	15 December 2024	10 days	himself	Bharatiya Janata Party
26		Chandrashekhar Bawankule	Kamthi	15 December 2024	incumbent	1 year, 267 days	Devendra Fadnavis	Bharatiya Janata Party

== Ministers of State ==
No.	Portrait	Deputy Minister (Constituency)	Term of office			Political party	Ministry	Minister	Chief Minister
No.	Portrait	Deputy Minister (Constituency)	From	To	Period	Political party	Ministry	Minister	Chief Minister
Deputy Minister of Revenue
The Post of Deputy Minister / Minister of States has been kept Vacant from 23 November 2019 To 28 November 2019			23 November 2019	28 November 2019	5 days	NA	Fadnavis II	Devendra Fadnavis	Devendra Fadnavis
01		Abdul Sattar Abdul Nabi (MLA for Sillod Constituency No. 104- Chhatrapati Sambhaji Nagar District Also Previously Known Aurangabad District (Legislative Assembly)	30 December 2019	27 June 2022	2 years, 179 days	Shiv Sena	Thackeray	Balasaheb Thorat	Uddhav Thackeray
02		Prajakt Tanpure (MLA for Rahuri Constituency No. 223- Ahmednagar District) (Legislative Assembly)	27 June 2022	29 June 2022	2 days	Nationalist Congress Party	Thackeray	Balasaheb Thorat	Uddhav Thackeray
The Post of Deputy Minister / Minister of States has been kept Vacant from 30 June 2022			30 June 2022	26 November 2024	2 years, 149 days	NA	Eknath	Eknath Shinde (2022 - 2022); Radhakrishna Vikhe Patil (2022 – 2024)	Eknath Shinde
03		Yogesh Kadam (MLA for Dapoli Constituency No. 263- Ratnagiri District) (Legislative Assembly)	21 December 2024	Incumbent	1 year, 261 days	Shiv Sena (Shinde Group)	Fadnavis III	Chandrashekhar Bawankule (2024–Present)	Devendra Fadnavis
