= Ministry of Energy, New and Renewable Energy Maharashtra =

Government department of Maharashtra, India

Ministry of Energy, New and Renewable Energy Maharashtra Government of Maharashtra
- मंत्रालय ऊर्जा, नवीन और नवीकरणीय ऊर्जा महाराष्ट्र शासन
- Seal of the state of Maharashtra

- Building of Administrative Headquarters of Mumbai

Agency overview
- Formed: 1960; 66 years ago
- Preceding agency: Department of Energy
- Jurisdiction: Chief Minister of Maharashtra
- Headquarters: Mantralaya, Mumbai
- Annual budget: State budget of Government of Maharashtra
- Ministers responsible: Devendra Fadnavis, Chief Minister and Minister of Energy; Atul Save, Minister of Renewable Energy
- Deputy Ministers responsible: Meghana Bordikar, Minister of State Energy and Renewable Energy
- Agency executives: Mr. Asim Gupta (IAS), Principal Secretary; Mr. U.D. Walunj, Joint Secretary; Mr. P.P. Badgeri, Deputy Secretary
- Website: http://www.mahaurja.com/

Ministry of Energy, New and Renewable Energy Maharashtra or MAHAURJA is a ministry of Government of Maharashtra. The Ministry is currently headed by Devendra Fadnavis, a Chief Minister of Maharashtra and Cabinet Minister.

The Ministry is mainly responsible for research and development, intellectual property protection, and international cooperation, promotion, and coordination in renewable energy sources such as wind power, small hydro, biogas, and solar power. The broad aim of the Ministry is to develop and deploy new and renewable energy for supplementing the energy requirements of India.

The Ministry is headquartered in Mantralaya, Mumbai, Mumbai. According to the Central New and Renewable Energy Ministry's 2012–2013 annual report, India has made significant advances in several renewable energy sectors which include, Solar energy, Wind power, and Hydroelectricity.

== List ==
=== Minister of Energy ===
#	Portrait	Minister	Constituency	Term of office			Chief Minister	Party
1		Shankarrao Chavan	Bhokar	1 May 1960	20 November 1962	3 years, 207 days	Yashwantrao Chavan	Indian National Congress
1		Shankarrao Chavan	Bhokar	20 November 1962	24 November 1963	3 years, 207 days	Marotrao Kannamwar	Indian National Congress
2		P. K. Sawant	Chiplun	25 November 1963	5 December 1963	10 days	himself	Indian National Congress
(1)		Shankarrao Chavan	Bhokar	5 December 1963	1 March 1967	3 years, 86 days	Vasantrao Naik	Indian National Congress
3		Madhukar Chaudhari	Raver	1 March 1967	27 October 1969	2 years, 240 days	Vasantrao Naik	Indian National Congress
4		S. K. Wankhede	Sawargaon	27 October 1969	13 March 1972	2 years, 138 days	Vasantrao Naik	Indian National Congress
5		M. B. Popat	Dhobitalao	13 March 1972	4 April 1973	1 year, 22 days	Vasantrao Naik	Indian National Congress
6		Yashwantrao Mohite	Karad South	4 April 1973	17 March 1974	347 days	Vasantrao Naik	Indian National Congress
7		Rafiq Zakaria	MLC	17 March 1974	21 February 1975	341 days	Vasantrao Naik	Indian National Congress
(1)		Shankarrao Chavan	Bhokar	21 February 1975	17 May 1977	2 years, 85 days	himself	Indian National Congress
8		Narendra Tikde	Savner	17 May 1977	5 March 1978	292 days	Vasantdada Patil	Indian National Congress
9		Jawaharlal Darda	MLC	5 March 1978	18 July 1978	135 days	Vasantdada Patil	Indian National Congress
10		Chhedilal Gupta		18 July 1978	17 February 1980	1 year, 214 days	Sharad Pawar	Janata Party
11		Jayant Shridhar Tilak	MLC	9 June 1980	21 January 1982	1 year, 226 days	A. R. Antulay	Indian National Congress
12		S. M. I. Aseer	Ahmednagar South	21 January 1982	2 February 1983	1 year, 12 days	Babasaheb Bhosale	Indian National Congress
13		Baliram Hiray	Dabhadi	2 February 1983	5 March 1985	2 years, 31 days	Vasantdada Patil	Indian National Congress
14		Sushilkumar Shinde		12 March 1985	3 June 1985	83 days	Vasantdada Patil	Indian National Congress
(9)		Jawaharlal Darda	MLC	3 June 1985	12 March 1986	282 days	Shivajirao Patil Nilangekar	Indian National Congress
15		V. Subramanian		12 March 1986	26 June 1988	2 years, 106 days	Shankarrao Chavan	Indian National Congress
16		Sudhakarrao Naik	Pusad	26 June 1988	4 March 1990	1 year, 251 days	Sharad Pawar	Indian National Congress
17		Padamsinh Patil	Osmanabad	4 March 1990	25 January 1991	327 days	Sharad Pawar	Indian National Congress
18		Datta Meghe	MLC	25 January 1991	25 June 1991	151 days	Sharad Pawar	Indian National Congress
(17)		Padamsinh Patil	Osmanabad	25 June 1991	6 March 1993	3 years, 262 days	Sudhakarrao Naik	Indian National Congress
(17)		Padamsinh Patil	Osmanabad	6 March 1993	14 March 1995	3 years, 262 days	Sharad Pawar	Indian National Congress
19		Gopinath Munde	Renapur Assembly constituency	14 March 1995	1 February 1999	4 years, 218 days	Manohar Joshi	Shiv Sena
19		Gopinath Munde	Renapur Assembly constituency	1 February 1999	18 October 1999	4 years, 218 days	Narayan Rane	Shiv Sena
(17)		Padamsinh Patil	Osmanabad	18 October 1999	18 January 2003	3 years, 92 days	Vilasrao Deshmukh	Nationalist Congress Party
20		Patangrao Kadam	Palus-Kadegaon	18 January 2003	1 November 2004	1 year, 288 days	Sushilkumar Shinde	Indian National Congress
21		Vilasrao Deshmukh	Latur City	1 November 2004	9 November 2004	8 days	himself	Indian National Congress
22		Dilip Walse Patil	Ambegaon	9 November 2004	8 December 2008	4 years, 29 days	Vilasrao Deshmukh	Nationalist Congress Party
23		Sunil Tatkare	Mangaon	8 December 2008	7 November 2009	334 days	Ashok Chavan	Nationalist Congress Party
24		Ajit Pawar	Baramati	7 November 2009	11 November 2010	2 years, 323 days	Ashok Chavan	Nationalist Congress Party
24		Ajit Pawar	Baramati	11 November 2010	25 September 2012	2 years, 323 days	Prithviraj Chavan	Nationalist Congress Party
25		Prithviraj Chavan	MLC	25 September 2012	7 December 2012	73 days	himself	Indian National Congress
(24)		Ajit Pawar	Baramati	7 December 2012	28 September 2014	1 year, 295 days	Prithviraj Chavan	Nationalist Congress Party
26		Devendra Fadnavis	Nagpur South West	31 October 2014	5 December 2014	35 days	himself	Bharatiya Janata Party
27		Chandrashekhar Bawankule	Kamthi	5 December 2014	12 November 2019	4 years, 342 days	Devendra Fadnavis	Bharatiya Janata Party
28		Balasaheb Thorat	Sangamner	28 November 2019	30 December 2019	32 days	Uddhav Thackeray	Indian National Congress
29		Nitin Raut	Nagpur North	30 December 2019	30 June 2022	2 years, 182 days	Uddhav Thackeray	Indian National Congress
(26)		Devendra Fadnavis	Nagpur South West	30 June 2022	5 December 2024	4 years, 90 days	Eknath Shinde	Bharatiya Janata Party
(26)		Devendra Fadnavis	Nagpur South West	5 December 2024	incumbent	4 years, 90 days	himself	Bharatiya Janata Party

=== Minister of Renewable Energy ===
#	Portrait	Minister	Constituency	Term of office			Chief Minister	Party
1		Atul Save	Aurangabad East	15 December 2024	incumbent	1 year, 287 days	Devendra Fadnavis	Bharatiya Janata Party

=== Minister of Non-Conventional Energy ===
#	Portrait	Minister	Constituency	Term of office			Chief Minister	Party
1		Vilasrao Deshmukh	Latur City	1 November 2004	9 November 2004	8 days	himself	Indian National Congress
2		Vinay Kore	Shahuwadi	9 November 2004	8 December 2008	4 years, 363 days	Vilasrao Deshmukh	Jan Surajya Shakti
2		Vinay Kore	Shahuwadi	8 December 2008	7 November 2009	4 years, 363 days	Ashok Chavan	Jan Surajya Shakti
3		Balasaheb Thorat	Sangamner	7 November 2009	11 November 2010	1 year, 4 days	Ashok Chavan	Indian National Congress
4		Ganesh Naik	Belapur	11 November 2010	28 September 2014	3 years, 321 days	Prithviraj Chavan	Nationalist Congress Party

== Mission ==
The mission of the Ministry is to bring in Energy Security; Increase the share of clean power; increase Energy Availability and Access; improve Energy Affordability; and maximise Energy Equity.

== Key functional area ==
The major functional area or Allocation of Business of MNRE are:

- Commission for Additional Sources of Energy (CASE);
- Indian Renewable Energy Development Agency (IREDA);
- Integrated Rural Energy Programme (IREP);
- Research and development of Biogas and programmes relating to Biogas units;
- Solar Energy including Solar Photovoltaic devices and their development, production and applications;
- Programme relating to improved chulhas and research and development thereof;
- All matters relating to small/mini/micro hydel projects of and below 25 MW capacities;
- Research and development of other non-conventional/renewable sources of energy and programmes relating thereto;
- Tidal energy;
- Geothermal Energy;
- Biofuel: (i) National Policy; (ii) research, development and demonstration on transport, stationary and other applications; (iii) setting up of a National Bio-fuels Development Board and strengthening the existing institutional mechanism; and (iv) overall coordination.

== See also ==
- Energy policy of India
- National hydrogen energy road map
- Renewable energy in India
- Wind power in India
