= Balasaheb Thorat =

Indian politician, agricultural cooperative and reforestation movement founder

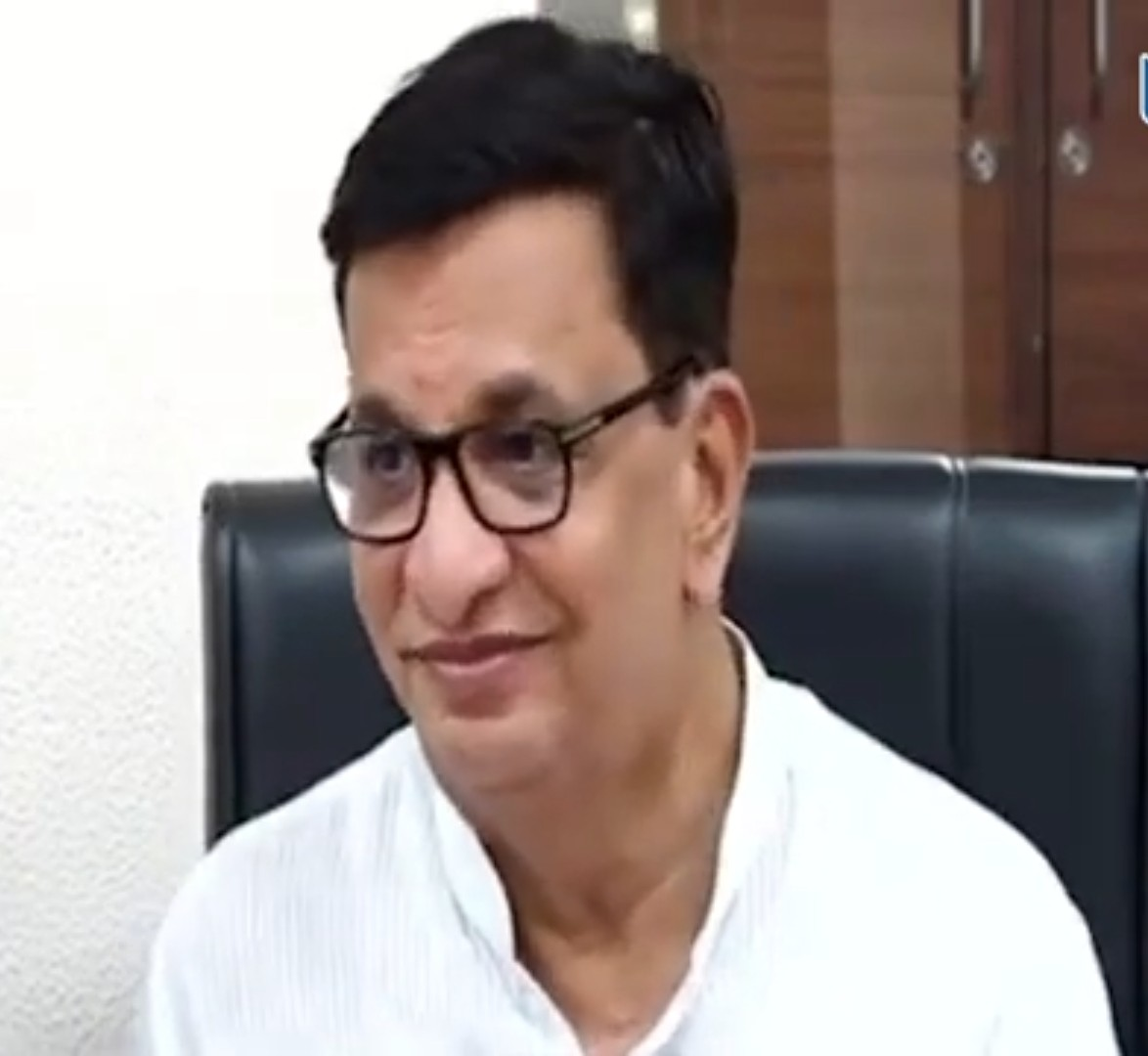

Leader of Congress Legislature Party Maharashtra Legislature
- In office 24 November 2019 – 26 November 2024
- National President Indian National Congress: Sonia Gandhi; Mallikarjun Kharge
- Preceded by: Prithviraj Chavan
- Succeeded by: Vijay Namdevrao Wadettiwar

Leader of the Opposition (Maharashtra Legislative Assembly)
- Additional Charge
- In office 18 July 2023 – 3 August 2023
- Governor: Ramesh Bais
- Deputy: Himself
- Chief Minister: Eknath Shinde
- Dy Chief Minister: Devendra Fadnavis (First); Ajit Pawar (Second)
- Speaker of the House: Rahul Narwekar
- Preceded by: Ajit Pawar; Jitendra Awhad (Acting)
- Succeeded by: Vijay Namdevrao Wadettiwar

Deputy Leader of the Opposition Maharashtra Legislative Assembly
- In office 4 July 2022 – 3 August 2023
- Governor: Bhagat Singh Koshyari; Ramesh Bais
- Chief Minister: Eknath Shinde
- Dy Chief Minister: Devendra Fadnavis (First); Ajit Pawar (From 02 July 2023) (Second)
- Leader of the Opposition: Ajit Pawar; Jitendra Awhad (Acting); Himself (Additional Charge)
- Speaker of the House: Rahul Narwekar
- Preceded by: Sudhir Mungantiwar
- Succeeded by: Jitendra Awhad (NCP); Ajay Choudhari (SHS(UTB))

Member of Maharashtra Legislative Assembly
- Incumbent
- Assumed office 1985
- Preceded by: B. J. Khatal-Patil
- Constituency: Sangamner

Cabinet Minister Government of Maharashtra
- In office 30 December 2019 – 29 June 2022
- Minister: Revenue
- Governor: Bhagat Singh Koshyari
- Cabinet: Thackeray ministry
- Chief Minister: Uddhav Thackeray
- Dy Chief Minister: Ajit Pawar
- Guardian Minister: Dhule District Additional Charge
- Preceded by: Himself (Acting)
- Succeeded by: Radhakrishna Vikhe Patil
- Incharge
- In office 28 November 2019 – 30 December 2019
- Minister: Revenue; Energy; Medical Education; School Education; Animal Husbandry; Dairy Development; Fisheries Department
- Governor: Bhagat Singh Koshyari
- Cabinet: Thackeray ministry
- Chief Minister: Uddhav Thackeray
- Preceded by: Chandrakant Patil (Revenue Ministry); Chandrashekhar Bawankule (Energy Ministry); Girish Mahajan (Medical Education Ministry); Ashish Shelar (School Education Ministry); Ram Shinde (Animal Husbandry Ministry); Ram Shinde (Dairy Development Ministry); Anil Sukhdevrao Bonde (Fisheries Department Ministry)
- Succeeded by: Himself (Revenue Ministry); Nitin Raut (Energy Ministry); Amit Deshmukh (Medical Education Ministry); Varsha Gaikwad (School Education Ministry); Sunil Chhatrapal Kedar (Animal Husbandry Ministry); Sunil Chhatrapal Kedar (Dairy Development Ministry); Aslam Shaikh (Fisheries Department Ministry)

President of Maharashtra Pradesh Congress Committee
- In office 7 July 2019 – 5 February 2021
- National President Indian National Congress: Sonia Gandhi
- Preceded by: Ashok Chavan
- Succeeded by: Nana Patole

Secretary of Maha Vikas Aghadi
- Incumbent
- Assumed office 26 November 2019
- President: Uddhav Thackeray
- Chairperson: Sharad Pawar
- Preceded by: Position established

Cabinet Minister Government of Maharashtra
- In office 11 November 2010 – 26 September 2014
- Minister: Revenue; Vimukta Jati; Food, Civil Supplies; Consumer Affairs; State Border Defence (First)
- Governor: Kateekal Sankaranarayanan; Om Prakash Kohli (additional charge); C. Vidyasagar Rao
- Cabinet: Prithviraj Chavan ministry
- Chief Minister: Prithviraj Chavan
- Dy Chief Minister: Ajit Pawar
- Guardian Minister: Ahmednagar District; Buldhana District; Nagpur District
- Preceded by: Narayan Rane (Revenue Ministry); Radhakrishna Vikhe-Patil (Vimukta Jati Ministry); Anil Deshmukh (Food, Civil Supplies Ministry); Anil Deshmukh (Consumer Protection Ministry); Patangrao Kadam (State Border Defence Ministry)
- Succeeded by: Eknath Khadse (Revenue Ministry); Mahadev Jankar (Vimukta Jati Ministry); Girish Bapat (Food, Civil Supplies Ministry); Girish Bapat (Consumer Protection Ministry); Eknath Khadse (State Border Defence Ministry)
- In office 7 November 2009 – 9 November 2010
- Minister: Agriculture; Soil and Water Conservation; School Education; Marathi Language
- Governor: S. C. Jamir; K. Sankaranarayanan
- Cabinet: Second Ashok Chavan ministry
- Chief Minister: Ashok Chavan
- Dy Chief Minister: Chhagan Bhujbal
- Guardian Minister: Ahmednagar District; Kolhapur District; Latur District
- Preceded by: Himself (Agriculture Ministry); Himself (Soil and Water Conservation Ministry); Radhakrishna Vikhe Patil (School Education Ministry); Vijaykumar Krishnarao Gavit (Marathi Language Ministry)
- Succeeded by: Radhakrishna Vikhe Patil (Agriculture Ministry); Ramraje Naik Nimbalkar (Soil and Water Conservation Ministry); Rajendra Darda (School Education Ministry); Radhakrishna Vikhe-Patil (Marathi Language Ministry)
- In office 8 December 2008 – 6 November 2009
- Minister: Agriculture; Protocol; Soil and Water Conservation
- Governor: S. C. Jamir
- Cabinet: First Ashok Chavan ministry
- Chief Minister: Ashok Chavan
- Dy Chief Minister: Chhagan Bhujbal
- Preceded by: Himself (Agriculture Ministry); Himself (Protocol Ministry); Surupsingh Hirya Naik (Soil and Water Conservation Ministry)
- Succeeded by: Himself (Agriculture Ministry); Ashok Chavan CM (Protocol Ministry); Himself (Soil and Water Conservation Ministry)
- In office 1 November 2004 – 4 December 2008
- Minister: Agriculture; Protocol
- Cabinet: Second Deshmukh ministry
- Chief Minister: Vilasrao Deshmukh
- Dy Chief Minister: R. R. Patil
- Preceded by: Sushilkumar Shinde CM (Agriculture Ministry); Ashok Chavan (Protocol Ministry)
- Succeeded by: Himself (Agriculture Ministry); Himself (Protocol Ministry)

Minister of State Government of Maharashtra
- In office 18 January 2003 – 4 November 2004
- Minister: Agriculture; Horticulture; Socially and Educationally Backward Classes
- Cabinet: Sushilkumar Shinde ministry
- Chief Minister: Sushilkumar Shinde
- Dy Chief Minister: Chhagan Bhujbal (2003); Vijaysingh Mohite-Patil (2003-04)
- In office 18 October 1999 – 16 January 2003
- Minister: Public Works (Including Public Undertakings); Command Area Development; Information Technology
- Cabinet: First Deshmukh ministry
- Chief Minister: Vilasrao Deshmukh
- Dy Chief Minister: Chhagan Bhujbal

Personal details
- Born: Vijay Bhausaheb Thorat; 7 February 1953 (age 73)
- Party: Indian National Congress
- Other political affiliations: Independent
- Children: 3 daughters & 1 son
- Education: Fergusson College B.A, ILS Law College, Pune L.L.B
- Nickname: Vijay

Vijay alias Balasaheb Bhausaheb Thorat (Marathi pronunciation: [baːɭaːsaːɦeb t̪ʰoɾaːt̪], born 7 February 1953), known popularly as Balasaheb Thorat, is an Indian politician who served as the revenue minister in Maharashtra state. He also served as the Deputy Leader of the Opposition in the Maharashtra Legislative Assembly. Thorat is a senior member of the Congress Party. He was an MLA from Sangamner constituency.

Thorat is a key figure in the cooperative movement and is the founder of a milk co-operative and former president of the Sangamner District and State Cooperative Bank.

He is recognised for his work in Sangamner taluka and Akole taluka. He has founded cooperative educational institutions in Sangamner. He is currently (as of July 2024) President of Amrutvahini College of Engineering. Previously, he served as Minister of Agriculture and as Minister of Revenue, and Khar Lands in the Government of Maharashtra.

== Early life ==
Thorat was born on 7 February 1953 to late Bhausaheb Thorat. He was named as Vijay. His father Bhausaheb Thorat was a peasant leader in Maharashtra and a one-time legislator from Sangamner constituency. Bhausaheb Thorat defeated the then political heavyweight of Maharashtra B. J. Khatal-Patil, a minister in the Maharashtra's government for sixteen-years, in the 1978 Assembly elections as a candidate of INC.

== Education ==
Thorat obtained his LLB degree from ILS Law College, Pune in 1977 and BA from Ferguson college, Pune University in 1975.

== Political career ==
He began his political career as an Independent and fought for the Sangamner Vidhan Sabha seat and won with a margin of 10,159 votes on Shakuntala Khanderao Horat. Thereafter, he won 8 assembly elections without being defeated in any elections as a candidate of INC.

He was the Minister of State for agriculture in the first Vilasrao Deshmukh's government. Later in 2004 he was elevated to the rank of cabinet minister along with Anil Deshmukh of NCP. He was one of those few leaders in Maharashtra who served as ministers in the 15-year Congress-NCP alliance. He served as the minister of Agriculture, Water Conservation, Employment Guarantee Scheme and Additional charge of School Education in Prithviraj Chavan's cabinet. He is a well-known and a leading face in the cooperative movement of Maharashtra. His nephew Satyajeet Tambe Patil is also a politician in Ahmadnagar district and a two-time member of Ahmadnagar Municipality.

Thorat was made the MPCC chief in 2019 when Ashok Chavan resigned following the weak performance of the party in the Lok Sabha elections. Thorat had to battle with the large-scale defections from his party to the ruling alliance. Due to defections the Congress's tally in the assembly fell down decisively.

Under his leadership the party improved its tally from 31 legislators in the assembly to 44 legislators. After the 2019 political turmoil in Maharashtra with the formation of a post-poll alliance called Maha Vikas Aghadi by the Congress, NCP and Shiv Sena, Thorat was sworn in as a minister in the Uddhav Thackeray administration.

Thorat resigned as the leader of the Congress in Legislature in 2023.

He ran for reelection in 2024 and was able to retain his seat, making Thorat the longest-currently serving MLA in Maharashtra.

== Political statistics ==
SI No.	Year	Assembly Constituency	Opponent	Votes	Difference	Result
1.	1985	Sangamner	Shakuntala Khanderao Horat (INC)	40218-30059	10159	Won
2.	1990	Sangamner	Vasantrao Sakharam Gunjal (BJP)	57465-52603	4862	Won
3.	1995	Sangamner	Bapusaheb Namdeo Gulave (Independent)	73611-58957	14654	Won
4.	1999	Sangamner	Bapusaheb Namdeo Gulave (Shiv Sena)	61975-40524	21451	Won
5.	2004	Sangamner	Sambhajirao Ramchandra Thorat (Shiv Sena)	120058-44301	75757	Won
6.	2009	Sangamner	Babasaheb Dhondiba Kute (Shiv Sena)	96686-41310	55376	Won
7.	2014	Sangamner	Janardan Mhatarba Aher (Shiv Sena)	103564-44759	58805	Won
8.	2019	Sangamner	Sahebrao Ramchandra Navale (Shiv Sena)	125380-63128	62252	Won
9.	2024	Sangamner	Amol Khatal-Patil (Shiv Sena)	101826-112386	-10560	Lost

== Positions held ==
- 1985–2024 - Member of Legislative Assembly, Maharashtra.
- 1999–2004 - Minister of State for Agriculture, Govt. of Maharashtra
- 2004-2014 - Cabinet Minister, Govt. of Maharashtra
- 14 July 2019 – 5 February 2021 - PCC Chief, Maharashtra
- 26 November 2019 - 2023 - Congress Legislative Party leader, Maharashtra Legislative Assembly
- 28 November 2019 – 2023 - Cabinet Minister for Revenue, Govt. of Maharashtra
- 8 January 2020 - Guardian minister Kolhapur
- Permanent invitee - Congress Working Committee
