= Amol Khatal =

Indian politician

Amol Khatal Patil

Personal details
- Born: 8 May 1983 (age 42) Sangamner, Ahmednagar District, Maharashtra
- Party: (Shiv Sena),
- Other political affiliations: Bharatiya Janata Party

Amol Dhondibaba Khatal-Patil (born 1983) is an Indian politician from Maharashtra. In the 2024 Maharashtra Legislative Assembly election, he ran for MLA from Sangamner Assembly constituency in Ahmednagar district representing the (Shiv Sena – Shinde faction), and won against incumbent MLA Balasaheb Thorat, who had held the seat since 1985.

== Early life and education ==
Amol Khatal is from Sangamner, Ahilyaanagar District, Maharashtra. He is the son of Dhondiba Kisan Khatal. He completed his B.Com. in 2019 at Yashwantrao Chavhan Mukt Vidyapith, Nashik. Earlier, he did his schooling at Nutan Secondary and Higher Secondary School, Rajapur.

== Political career ==
Amol Khatal is a member of legislative assembly.

Khatal won from Sangamner Assembly constituency representing the Shiv Sena in the 2024 Maharashtra Legislative Assembly election. He polled 101,826 votes and won against former minister and eight time MLA, Balasaheb Bhausaheb Thorat of the Indian National Congress, by a margin of 10,560 votes.
