= Fourth Vasantdada Patil ministry =

- Ministry of Maharashtra
- Date formed: 10 March 1985
- Date dissolved: 1 June 1985

People and organisations
- Governor: Idris Hasan Latif (till April 1985); Kona Prabhakara Rao (after April 1985)
- Chief Minister: Vasantdada Patil
- Total no. of members: 8 Cabinet ministers (Incl. Chief Minister)
- Member parties: Congress
- Status in legislature: Majority government
- Opposition party: INC(S)
- Opposition leader: Legislative Assembly: Sharad Pawar (INC(S)); Legislative Council: Devidas Karale (INC(S))

History
- Election: 1985
- Legislature term: 5 years
- Predecessor: V. Patil III
- Successor: Nilangekar

After securing a majority in the 1985 Maharashtra legislative elections, the incumbent Chief Minister Vasantdada Patil was re-appointed on 10 March 1985. Patil formed his fourth and last ministry, consisting of 7 cabinet ministers besides him. The cabinet continued for about 3 months, as Patil resigned and was replaced by Shivajirao Patil Nilangekar in June 1985.

== List of ministers ==
The cabinet ministers in Patil's cabinet included:

Portfolio	Minister	Took office	Left office	Party
Chief Minister: General Administration; Home Affairs; Jails; Urban Development; Urban Land Ceiling; Public Works; (Excluding Public Undertakings): Information and Public Relations; Information Technology; Animal Husbandry; Fisheries; Dairy Development; Protocol; Transport; Water supply; Sanitation; Environment and Climate Change; Command Area Development; Disaster Management; Ex. Servicemen Welfare; Departments or portfolios not allocated to any minister.	Vasantdada Patil	10 March 1985	1 June 1985	INC
Cabinet Minister: Industries; Revenue; Relief & Rehabilitation; Social Welfare; Marathi language; Other Backward Classes; Earthquake Rehabilitation	Sudhakarrao Naik	12 March 1985	1 June 1985	INC
Cabinet Minister: Finance; Planning; Cultural Affairs; Sports and Youth Welfare; Law and Judiciary; School Education; Majority Welfare Development; Mining Department; Energy	Sushilkumar Shinde	12 March 1985	1 June 1985	INC
Cabinet Minister: Irrigation; Tourism; Special Assistance; Skill Development, Employment and Entrepreneurship; Horticulture; Panchayat Raj	Jawaharlal Darda	12 March 1985	1 June 1985	INC
Cabinet Minister: Cooperation; Labour; Legislative Affairs; Agriculture; Minority Development and Aukaf; Public Works; (Including Public Undertakings)	N. M. Tidke	12 March 1985	1 June 1985	INC
Cabinet Minister: Rural Development; Health and Family Welfare; Medical Education and Drugs; Employment Guarantee Scheme; Ports; Higher and Technical Education; Special Backward Classes Welfare; Nomadic Tribes; Other Backward Bahujan Welfare	B. A. Sawant	12 March 1985	1 June 1985	INC
Cabinet Minister: Forests; Social Forestry; Tribal Welfare; Food and Civil Supplies; Food and Drug Administration; Woman and Child Development; Socially And Educationally Backward Classes; Vimukta Jati; Khar Land Development	Surupsingh Hirya Naik	12 March 1985	1 June 1985	INC
Cabinet Minister: Housing; Slum Improvement; House Repairs and Reconstruction; Prohibition; Excise; Textiles; Marketing; Soil and Water Conservation	V. Subramanian	12 March 1985	1 June 1985	INC
