= Radhakrishna Vikhe Patil =

Indian politician

Cabinet Minister Government of Maharashtra
- Incumbent
- Assumed office 15 December 2024
- Minister: Water Resources (Godavari & Krishna Valley)
- Governor: C. P. Radhakrishnan; Acharya Devvrat additional charge
- Cabinet: Third Fadnavis ministry
- Chief Minister: Devendra Fadnavis
- Deputy CM: Eknath Shinde; Ajit Pawar (till his demise in 2026) Sunetra Pawar (from 2026)
- Guardian Minister: Ahilyanagar
- In office 9 August 2022 – 26 November 2024
- Minister: Revenue; Animal Husbandry
- Cabinet: Eknath Shinde ministry
- Chief Minister: Eknath Shinde
- Guardian Minister: Ahmednagar; Solapur
- In office 16 June 2019 – 8 November 2019
- Minister: Housing
- Cabinet: Second Fadnavis ministry
- Chief Minister: Devendra Fadnavis
- In office 7 November 2009 – 9 November 2010
- Minister: Transport; Ports; Law & Judiciary
- Cabinet: Second Ashok Chavan ministry
- Chief Minister: Ashok Chavan
- In office 8 December 2008 – 26 October 2009
- Minister: School Education
- Cabinet: First Ashok Chavan ministry
- Chief Minister: Ashok Chavan
- Guardian Minister: Ahmednagar
- In office 1995–1999
- Minister: Skill Development & Entrepreneurship; Earthquake Rehabilitation
- Cabinet: Joshi ministry / Rane ministry
- Chief Minister: Manohar Joshi; Narayan Rane

20th Leader of the Opposition Maharashtra Legislative Assembly
- In office 23 December 2014 – 4 June 2019
- Governer: C. Vidyasagar Rao; Bhagat Singh Koshyari
- Chief Minister: Devendra Fadnavis
- Deputy LoP: Jayant Patil
- Preceded by: Eknath Shinde
- Succeeded by: Vijay Wadettiwar

Member of the Maharashtra Legislative Assembly
- Incumbent
- Assumed office 1995
- Preceded by: Annasaheb Patil
- Constituency: Shirdi

Personal details
- Born: 15 June 1959 (age 67) Loni, Bombay State, India
- Party: Bharatiya Janata Party (Since 2019)
- Other political affiliations: Indian National Congress (Before 1997; 2004–2019); Shiv Sena (1997–2004)
- Spouse: Shalini Vikhe Patil
- Children: Sujay Vikhe Patil (son)
- Parent: Balasaheb Vikhe Patil (father)
- Education: Pravara Rural Education Society, Pravaranagar

Radhakrishna Balasaheb Vikhe Patil is an Indian politician in his eighth consecutive term as MLA from Shirdi Vidhan Sabha Constituency in Ahilyanagar district of Maharashtra. He is currently the Minister for Revenue, in the Government of Maharashtra and was the 1st Minister sworn in the Eknath Shinde ministry expansion, after Eknath Shinde and Devendra Fadnavis in the Cabinet Expansion held on 9 August 2022. Radhakrishna Vikhe Patil has been a member of the Maharashtra Vidhan Sabha since 1995. He was elected in the 2014 with 1,21,459 votes and most recently in 2019 with record breaking 1,32,316 votes.

He is a 7-time undefeated MLA from Shirdi in Ahmednagar district of Maharashtra. He has worked under 6 different Chief Ministers since 1995 and has held 12 different portfolios in his career.

Positions Held :

1. Minister of Revenue in the Eknath Shinde ministry (2022–2024)
2. Minister of Housing in the First Fadnavis ministry (2019 - 2019)
3. Leader of Opposition, Maharashtra Vidhan Sabha (2014 - 2019)
4. Minister of Agriculture, Food & Drug Administration, Marathi Language, and Other Backward Classes in the Prithviraj Chavan ministry (2010 - 2014)
5. Minister of Transport, Ports, and Law & Judiciary in the Second Ashok Chavan ministry (2009 - 2010)
6. Minister of School Education in the First Ashok Chavan ministry (2008 - 2009)
7. Minister of Skill Development & Entrepreneurship, and Earthquake Rehabilitation in the Manohar Joshi ministry, Narayan Rane ministry. (1995 - 1999)

Radhakrishna Vikhe Patil was the Leader of Opposition in Maharashtra Vidhansabha from 2014 to 2019 during the government led by Devendra Fadnavis. In 2019 Vikhe Patil, his Son, Sujay, and many other Congress party members joined the Bharatiya Janata party. Radhakrishna Vikhe Patil is the son of veteran Maharashtra and former union Minister of Finance (India), Balasaheb Vikhe Patil. In the Loksabha election of 2019, his son Sujay got elected to the Loksabha for the BJP from the Ahmednagar constituency.
