= Second Shankarrao Chavan ministry =

- Ministry of Maharashtra
- Date formed: 12 March 1986
- Date dissolved: 26 June 1988

People and organisations
- Governor: Kona Prabhakara Rao (1986); Shankar Dayal Sharma (1986-87); K. Brahmananda Reddy (1988)
- Chief Minister: Shankarrao Chavan
- Total no. of members: 7 Cabinet ministers (Incl. Chief Minister)
- Member parties: Congress
- Status in legislature: Majority government
- Opposition party: INC(S) (Until December 1986); JNP; PWP; RPI(G)
- Opposition leader: Legislative Assembly: Sharad Pawar (INC(S)) (1986) Babanrao Dhakne (JNP) (1986) Nihal Ahmed (JNP) (1986-87) Datta Patil (PWP) (1987-88); Legislative Council: Devidas Karale (INC(S)) (1986) R. S. Gavai (RPI(G)) (1986-88)

History
- Election: 1985
- Legislature term: 5 years
- Predecessor: Nilangekar
- Successor: Pawar II

Shankarrao Chavan was sworn in as Chief Minister of Maharashtra for the second time in March 1986, on resignation of his predecessor, Shivajirao Patil Nilangekar. Chavan's cabinet served until his resignation on 26 June 1988, and subsequent replacement by Sharad Pawar's ministry.

== List of ministers ==
The following is a list of ministers in Chavan's cabinet:

Portfolio	Minister	Took office	Left office	Party
Chief Minister: General Administration; Home Affairs; Jails; Water Resources (Krishna Valley Development); Water Resources (Konkan Valley Development); Urban Land Ceiling; Special Assistance; Irrigation; Water supply; Sanitation; Information and Public Relations; Information Technology; Protocol; Marketing; State Excise; Departments or portfolios not allocated to any minister.	Shankarrao Chavan	12 March 1986	26 June 1988	INC
Cabinet Minister: Agriculture; Horticulture; Command Area Development; Relief & Rehabilitation; Labour; Animal Husbandry; Fisheries; Dairy Development; Other Backward Classes; Other Backward Bahujan Welfare	Bhagwantrao Gaikwad	12 March 1986	26 June 1988	INC
Cabinet Minister: Revenue; Cooperation; Public Works; (Excluding Public Undertakings): Public Works; (Including Public Undertakings): Transport (12 March 1986 – 23 May 1987); Legislative Affairs; Forest; Social Forestry; Skill Development, Entrepreneurship; Textiles; Socially And Educationally Backward Classes; Majority Welfare Development; Soil and Water Conservation; Mining Department	Vilasrao Deshmukh	12 March 1986	26 June 1988	INC
Cabinet Minister: Finance; Planning; Law and Judiciary; Industrial (12 March 1986 – 23 May 1987); Transport (23 May 1987 – 26 June 1988); Marathi Language; Special Backward Classes Welfare; Nomadic Tribes; Khar Land Development; Tribal Development	Sushilkumar Shinde	12 March 1986	26 June 1988	INC
Cabinet Minister: School Education; Higher and Technical Education; Sports and Youth Welfare; Cultural Affairs; Employment; Tourism; Vimukta Jati; Panchayat Raj	Ram Meghe	12 March 1986	26 June 1988	INC
Cabinet Minister: Prohibition; Employment Guarantee Scheme; Industries (23 May 1987 – 26 June 1988); Ports; Public Health; Medical Education, and Drug; Family Planning; Rural Development; Social Welfare; Woman and Child Development	Bhai Sawant	12 March 1986	10 March 1988	INC
Cabinet Minister: Energy; Housing; Urban Development; Food and Civil Supplies; Environment; Slum Improvement; Food and Drug Administration; Minority Development and Aukaf; Disaster Management; Earthquake Rehabilitation; Ex. Servicemen Welfare	V. Subramanian	12 March 1986	26 June 1988	INC
