= B. J. Khatal-Patil =

Indian politician (1919–2019)

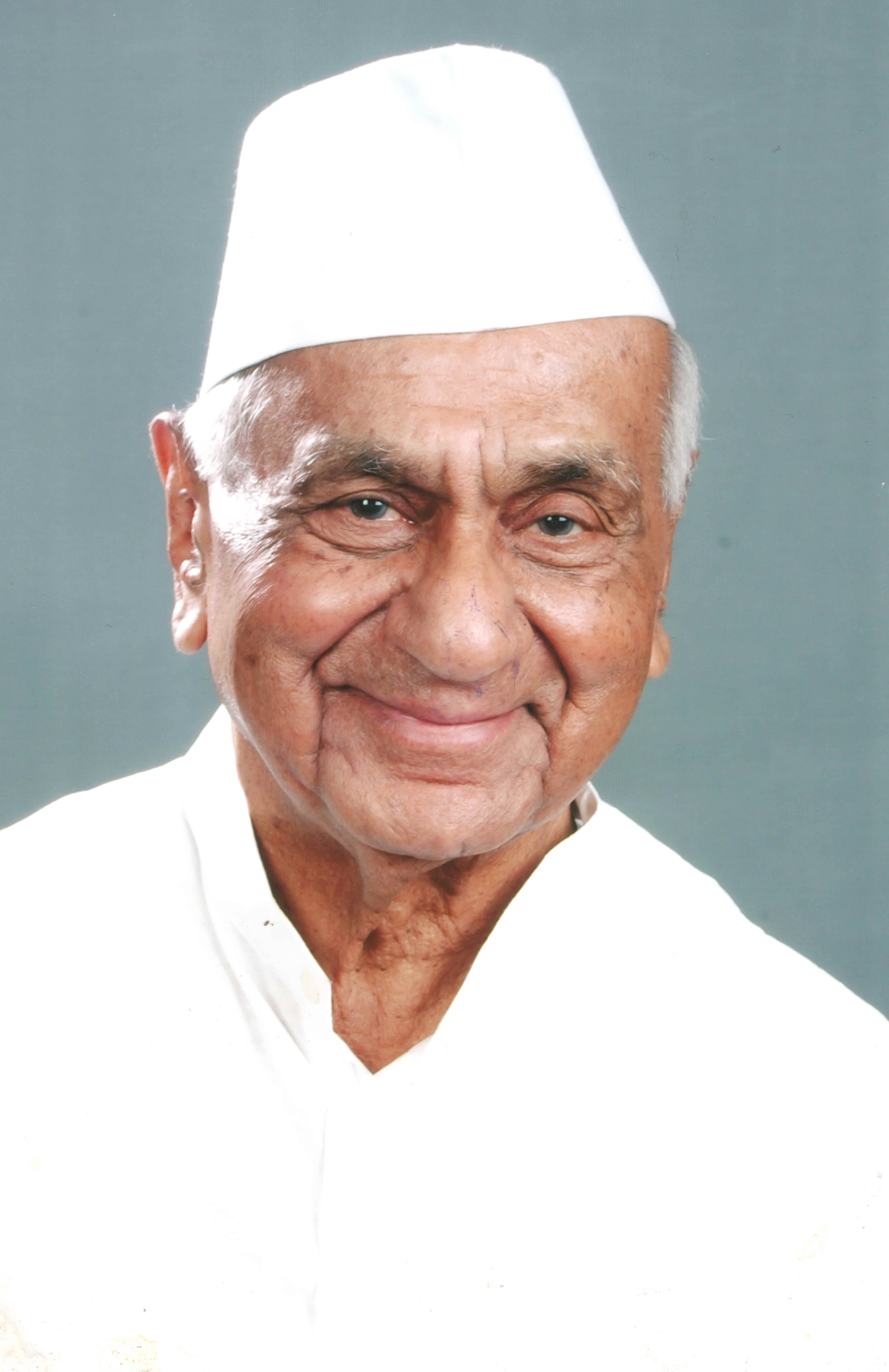
- B. J. Khatal-Patil

Personal details
- Born: 26 March 1919 Sangamner, Ahmednagar District
- Died: 16 September 2019 (aged 100) Sangamner, Ahmednagar District
- Party: Indian National Congress (INC) Self Retirement in 1985
- Spouse: Prabhavati Khatal-Patil
- Children: 6

Bhikajirao Jijaba Khatal-Patil (26 March 1919 – 16 September 2019), popularly known as Dada or Khatal Saheb was an Indian politician. He was a senior Maharashtra leader and a veteran Congressman. He served as a member of the Legislative Assembly of Maharashtra for over 20 years, also holding various Cabinet ministries in the Maharashtra Government. He represented the Sangamner constituency of Maharashtra and was a member of the Indian National Congress (INC) political party. In 1985 he retired from politics. He was elected to the Maharashtra Vidhan Sabha from Sangamner during 1962, 1967, 1972 and 1980 elections.

== Early life and family ==
With his sons and daughters-in-law

B. J. Khatal-Patil was born in a Maratha family on 26 March 1919 at Dhandarphal, a small village few kilometres from Sangamner town in Ahmednagar District of Maharashtra, India. He married Prabhavati Khatal, daughter of then Congress leader and MLA Shri K. B. Deshmukh. The couple had six children. Prabhavati Khatal-Patil was herself a social activist and a freedom fighter.

He completed his Bachelor of Arts from Pune University and LL.B. from the ILS Law College in Pune. He started his career as a lawyer. He grew up to be a lawyer not only in Ahmednagar district but in Maharashtra. He was an active participant in the struggle for independence of India. He participated in the Non-cooperation Movement led by Mahatma Gandhi.

== Political career ==
He first contested the Maharashtra state assembly elections in 1952 from Sangamner constituency, but he lost the election to the then political heavyweight Late Shri. Datta Deshmukh.

In the next elections held in 1957 he decided not to contest. His decision was in protest of the Congress stand against Samyukta Maharashtra Movement. He was a strong supporter of Samyukta Maharashtra. He conveyed to the congress leadership that he would not contest the elections himself as a protest but at the same time would not work against the party and would support the candidate fielded by the party.

He entered the Maharashtra legislative assembly for the first time in 1962 from Sangamner, representing the undivided Congress Party and then he never looked back. He was a member of the Maharashtra Legislative Assembly from 1962–1967, 1967–1972, 1972–1978 and from 1980–1985.

Immediately in 1962 when he was elected to the Maharashtra legislative assembly and was immediately appointed a Minister. He served as the minister in the Maharashtra Cabinet for a period of over 16 years. During the period, he served in the Maharashtra state government as Minister of State for Co-operation, Planning, Revenue etc. and then as Minister of Law & Judiciary, Food and Civil Supplies, Irrigation, PWD etc. He served as Minister under five different Chief Ministers: Shri. Yashwantrao Chavan, Shri. Marotrao Kannamwar, Shri Vasantrao Naik, Shri. Shankarrao Chavan and Barrister A. R. Antulay.

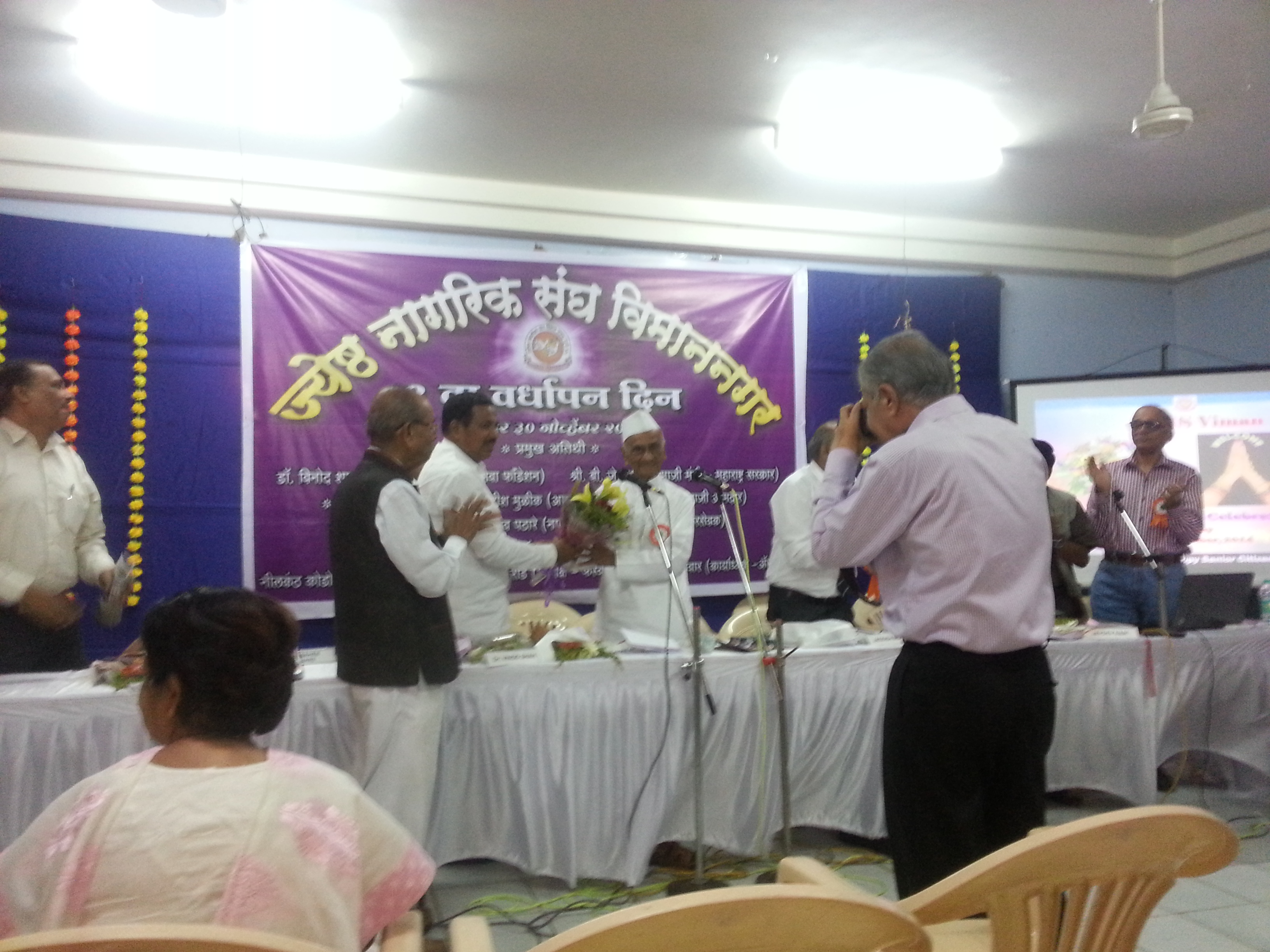
Patil felicitated by Bapusaheb Pathare.

In the general elections of 1980, Congress (I) won a majority in Parliament and came to power under the leadership of Indira Gandhi. The Congress (I) also came to power in Maharashtra State and Barrister A. R. Antulay was appointed the Chief Minister of Maharashtra. B. J. Khatal was appointed the Minister for Food and Civil Supplies. He was the senior most member of the cabinet, even senior to the Chief Minister himself and was the second in command to the Chief Minister.

== Post Politics ==
He voluntarily retired from politics post 1985. During the elections of 1980 at the age of 61 he announced that this would be his last elections and he wouldn't be contesting elections henceforth. After leaving politics for the past 25 years he practised yoga and meditation. He often visited the 'Vipasana Kendra' in Igatpuri.

=== Literary works ===
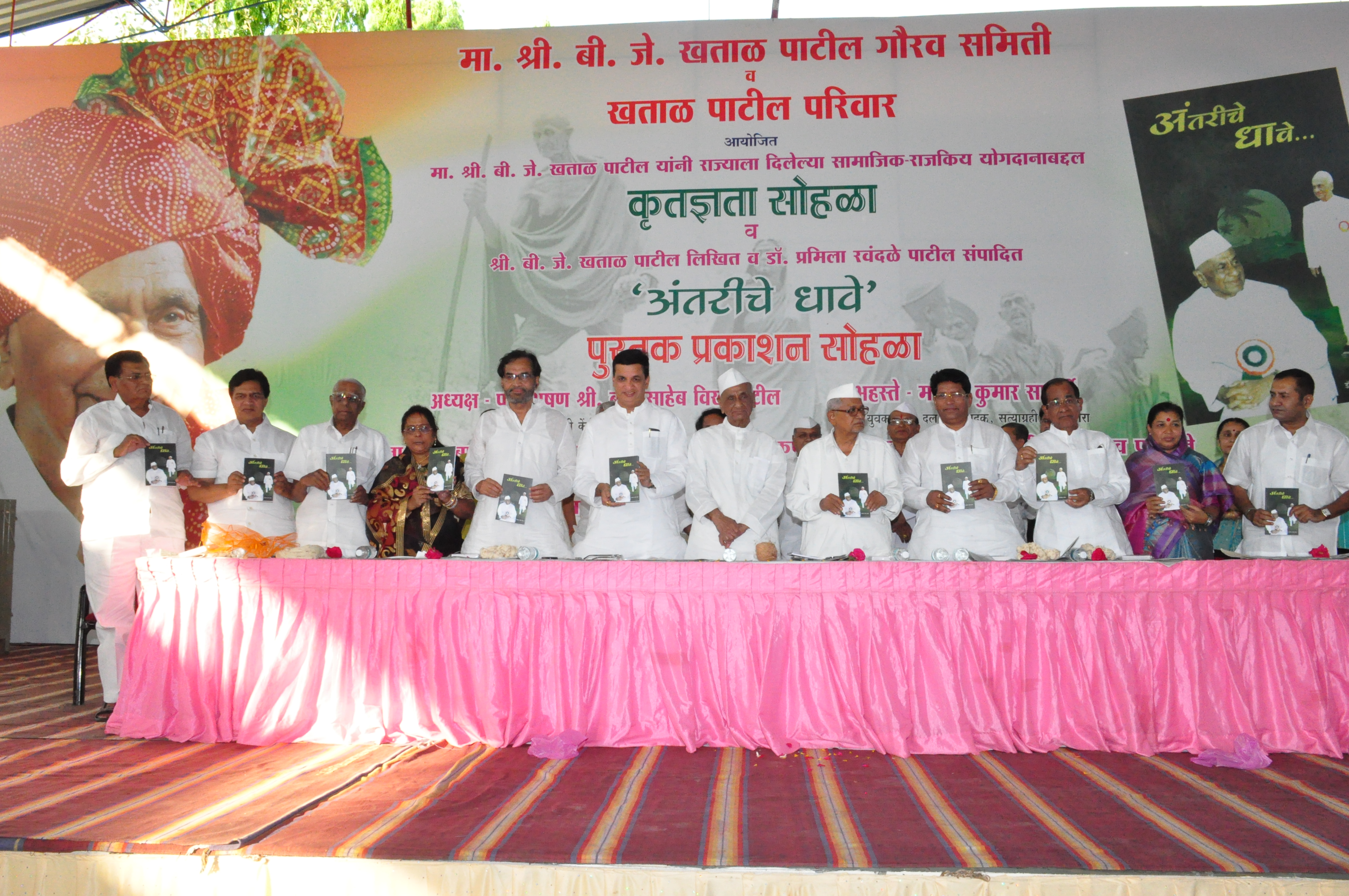
Publication of Book 'Antariche Dhave' in 2011 on his 91st birthday

At the age of 91, he took to writing books. His first book 'Antariche Dhave' was published in 2011 on his 92nd birthday. He wrote several books including:

- Antariche Dhave (Marathi) (compilation of his articles published in the Loksatta Newspaper);
- Gulamgiri (Marathi);
- Dinda Lokshahichi (Marathi);
- Gandhiji Aste tar.. (Marathi);
- Lashkari Vilkhyatil Pakistan (Marathi);
- Maze Shikshak, Sadhana Publication (My Teachers-Marathi);

He was in the process of writing one more book.

=== Controversies ===
In 2014, the treasury department of Govt. of Maharashtra, declared him as dead, after receiving a fake call from an unknown person claiming to be his daughter. This led to a large controversy on how could an Ex. Cabinet Minister be declared dead. Shri. Khatal played down the controversy saying such human errors could happen. He appealed to the higher authorities to pardon the people responsible for the wrongdoing.
