= Second Pawar ministry =

- Ministry of Maharashtra
- Date formed: 26 June 1988
- Date dissolved: 3 March 1990

People and organisations
- Governor: K. Brahmananda Reddy (1988-90); C. Subramaniam (1990)
- Chief Minister: Sharad Pawar
- Total no. of members: 16 Cabinet ministers (Incl. Chief Minister)
- Member parties: Congress
- Status in legislature: Majority government
- Opposition party: JNP; PWP; RPI(G)
- Opposition leader: Legislative Assembly: Datta Patil (PWP) (1988, 1989-90) Mrinal Gore (JNP) (1988-89); Legislative Council: R. S. Gavai (RPI(G)) (1988) Vitthalrao Hande (PWP) (1988-90)

History
- Election: 1990
- Legislature term: 5 years
- Predecessor: S. Chavan II
- Successor: Pawar III

On resignation of Shankarrao Chavan on 26 June 1988, Sharad Pawar was appointed Chief Minister of Maharashtra for the second time. Pawar formed his second ministry, which continued in office until legislative elections in 1990.

== Government formation ==
Pawar had been the State's youngest chief minister from 1978 to 1980, but had since quit Congress to from a separate party. The Pawar-led Indian Congress (Socialist) secured 54 seats in the 1985 legislative elections but his former party maintained its majority. In December 1986, Pawar re-joined Congress, hoping to be made the chief minister. When the incumbent chief minister Shankarrao Chavan was made India's minister of finance, Pawar replaced him.

== List of ministers ==
The following is a list of ministers in Pawar's cabinet:

Portfolio	Minister	Took office	Left office	Party
Chief Minister: General Administration; Information and Public Relations; Home Affairs; Information Technology; Water Resources (Krishna Valley Development) and (Konkan Valley Development); Water supply; Sanitation; Majority Welfare Development; Soil and Water Conservation; Departments or portfolios not allocated to any minister.	Sharad Pawar	26 June 1988	3 March 1990	INC
Cabinet Minister: Industries; Labour; Law and Judiciary; Marketing; Mining Department	Ramrao Adik	26 June 1988	3 March 1990	INC
Cabinet Minister: Revenue; Cultural Affairs; Food and Drug Administration; Disaster Management	Prabha Rau	26 June 1988	3 March 1990	INC
Cabinet Minister: Finance; Planning; Employment Guarantee Scheme; Skill Development, Entrepreneurship; Protocol; Socially And Educationally Backward Classes; Ex. Servicemen Welfare	Sushilkumar Shinde	26 June 1988	3 March 1990	INC
Cabinet Minister: Public Health and Family Welfare; Medical Education; Other Backward Classes	Jawaharlal Darda	26 June 1988	3 March 1990	INC
Cabinet Minister: Agriculture; Horticulture; Command Area Development; Tourism; Woman and Child Development; Vimukta Jati	Vilasrao Deshmukh	26 June 1988	3 March 1990	INC
Cabinet Minister: Social Welfare (26 June 1988 – 02 January 1989); Energy; Parliamentary Affairs; Rural Development; Cultural Affairs; Special Backward Classes Welfare	Sudhakarrao Naik	26 June 1988	3 March 1990	INC
Cabinet Minister: Irrigation; Home Affairs (Jails); Sports and Youth Welfare; Earthquake Rehabilitation	Padamsinh Patil	26 June 1988	3 March 1990	INC
Cabinet Minister: Tribal Welfare; Transport; Nomadic Tribes	Surupsingh Hirya Naik	26 June 1988	3 March 1990	INC
Cabinet Minister: Forest; Social Forestry; Prohibition; Excise; Other Backward Bahujan Welfare	Chhedilal Gupta,	26 June 1988	3 March 1990	INC
Cabinet Minister: Cooperation; Environment and Climate Change; Khar Land Development	Abhaysinh Raje Bhosale	26 June 1988	3 March 1990	INC
Cabinet Minister: Urban Development; Minority Development and Aukaf	Ishaq Jamkhanawala	26 June 1988	3 March 1990	INC
Cabinet Minister: Housing; Textiles; Ports Development	W. R. Sherekar	26 June 1988	3 March 1990	INC
Cabinet Minister: Public Works (Excluding Public Undertakings); Public Works (Including Public Undertakings); Relief & Rehabilitation	Vijaysinh Mohite-Patil	26 June 1988	3 March 1990	INC
Cabinet Minister: Food and Civil Supplies; Animal Husbandry; Fisheries; Dairy Development	Datta Meghe	26 June 1988	3 March 1990	INC
Cabinet Minister: School Education; Higher and Technical Education; Panchayat Raj	Kamal Kishore Kadam	26 June 1988	3 March 1990	INC
Cabinet Minister: Social Justice (02 January 1989 – 03 March 1990); Special Assistance; Marathi Language; Employment	N. M. Kamble	2 November 1989	3 March 1990	INC
