= Nilangekar ministry =

- Ministry of Maharashtra
- Date formed: 3 June 1985
- Date dissolved: 6 March 1986

People and organisations
- Governor: Kona Prabhakara Rao
- Chief Minister: Shivajirao Patil Nilangekar
- Total no. of members: 12 Cabinet ministers (Incl. Chief Minister)
- Member parties: Congress
- Status in legislature: Majority government
- Opposition party: INC(S); JNP
- Opposition leader: Legislative Assembly: Sharad Pawar (INC(S)) Babanrao Dhakne (JNP); Legislative Council: Devidas Karale (INC(S))

History
- Election: 1985
- Legislature term: 5 years
- Predecessor: V. Patil IV
- Successor: S. Chavan II

Shivajirao Patil Nilangekar became the chief minister of Maharashtra in June 1985, on resignation of Vasantdada Patil. He formed a 11-member ministry that served for less than a year until Nilangekar's resignation amidst fraud allegations.

== List of ministers ==
Nilangekar was sworn in on 3 June 1985, while his ministers were administered oath of office on the next day:

Portfolio	Minister	Took office	Left office	Party
Chief Minister General Administration: Home Affairs; Jails; Urban Development; Urban Land Ceiling; Information and Public Relations; Information Technology; Law and Judiciary; Water supply; Sanitation; Other Backward Classes; Earthquake Rehabilitation; Majority Welfare Development; Marketing; Departments or portfolios not allocated to any minister.	Shivajirao Patil Nilangekar	3 June 1985	6 March 1986	INC
Cabinet Minister: Energy; Tourism; Cultural Affairs; Prohibition; Excise; Marathi language; Special Backward Classes Welfare	Jawaharlal Darda	4 June 1985	6 March 1986	INC
Cabinet Minister: Irrigation; Food and Civil Supplies; Skill Development, Entrepreneurship; Food and Drug Administration; Woman and Child Development	Shivajirao Deshmukh	4 June 1985	6 March 1986	INC
Cabinet Minister: School Education; Higher and Technical Education; Employment; Public Works; (Including Public Undertakings)	Ram Meghe	4 June 1985	6 March 1986	INC
Cabinet Minister: Agriculture; Command Areas Development; Relief & Rehabilitation; Sports and Youth Welfare; Ex. Servicemen Welfare; Soil and Water Conservation	Vijaysinh Mohite-Patil	4 June 1985	6 March 1986	INC
Cabinet Minister: Industries; Mining Department; Revenue; Social Welfare; Textiles; Protocol; Socially And Educationally *Backward Classes; Horticulture	Sudhakarrao Naik	4 June 1985	6 March 1986	INC
Cabinet Minister: Public Works; (Excluding Public Undertakings): Forests; Social Forestry; Tribal Welfare; Disaster Management; Vimukta Jati; Nomadic Tribes	Surupsingh Hirya Naik	4 June 1985	6 March 1986	INC
Cabinet Minister: Health and Family Welfare; Medical Education and Drugs; Employment Guarantee Scheme; Ports; Khar Land Development; Fisheries; Special Assistance; Rural Development	Balachandra Sawant	4 June 1985	6 March 1986	INC
Cabinet Minister: Finance; Planning; Environment; Minority Development and Aukaf; Panchayat Raj	Sushilkumar Shinde	4 June 1985	6 March 1986	INC
Cabinet Minister: Housing; Slum Improvement; House Repairs and Reconstruction	V. Subramaniam	4 June 1985	6 March 1986	INC
Cabinet Minister: Transport; Animal Husbandry; Dairy Development; Other Backward Bahujan Welfare	Anantrao Thopte	4 June 1985	6 March 1986	INC
Cabinet Minister: Cooperation; Labour; Legislative Affairs	N. M. Tidke	4 June 1985	6 March 1986	INC
