= Third Pawar ministry =

- Ministry of Maharashtra
- Date formed: 4 March 1990
- Date dissolved: 25 June 1991

People and organisations
- Governor: Chidambaram Subramaniam
- Chief Minister: Sharad Pawar
- Total no. of members: 15 Cabinet ministers (Incl. Chief Minister); 6 Ministers of state
- Member parties: Congress; RPI(A); Independents
- Status in legislature: Majority Coalition government
- Opposition party: Shiv Sena; BJP; PWP; RPI(G); JD
- Opposition leader: Legislative Assembly: Manohar Joshi (Shiv Sena); Legislative Council: Vitthalrao Hande (PWP) (1990) R. S. Gavai (RPI(G)) (1990-91)

History
- Election: 1990
- Legislature term: 5 years
- Predecessor: Pawar II
- Successor: S. Naik

After securing a majority in the 1990 Maharashtra legislative elections, the incumbent Chief Minister Sharad Pawar was re-appointed on 4 March 1990. Pawar formed his third ministry, consisting of 15 cabinet ministers and 6 ministers of state. The cabinet continued until June 1991, when Pawar was replaced by Sudhakarrao Naik.

== Government formation ==
In the 1990 legislative elections, the Pawar-led Congress party secured 141 out of the State's 288 seats. Pawar managed to form a majority government, with support from 10 Congress "rebels", or party members who contested elections as Independents.

Government formation Sharad Pawar (Congress)
Ballot →	1991
Required majority →	Simple majority
Government: • Congress (141); • Other parties and Independents (10)	151 / 288
Opposition: • Shiv Sena (52); • Bharatiya Janata Party (42); • Janata Dal (24); • Other parties and Independents (17)	137 / 288

== List of ministers ==
Pawar's initial ministry was sworn in on 7 March 1990, and underwent an expansion on 25 January 1991:

Portfolio	Minister	Took office	Left office	Party
Chief Minister: General Administration; Information and Public Relations; Information Technology; Home; Jails; Water Resources (Krishna Valley Development) and (Konkan Valley Development); Water supply; Sanitation; Departments or portfolios not allocated to any minister.	Sharad Pawar	4 March 1990	24 June 1991	INC
Cabinet Minister: Finance; Planning	Ramrao Adik	4 March 1990	24 June 1991	INC
Cabinet Minister: Urban Development; Law and Judiciary; Other Backward Classes	Sushilkumar Shinde	4 March 1990	24 June 1991	INC
Cabinet Minister: Labour; Employment; Special Backward Classes Welfare	N. M. Kamble	4 March 1990	24 June 1991	INC
Cabinet Minister: Revenue; Parliamentary Affairs; Socially And Educationally Backward Classes; Vimukta Jati	Sudhakarrao Naik	4 March 1990	24 June 1991	INC
Cabinet Minister: Tribal Welfare; Marathi Language	Surupsingh Hirya Naik	4 March 1990	24 June 1991	INC
Cabinet Minister: Irrigation; Command Area Development	Padamsinh Patil	4 March 1990	24 June 1991	INC
Cabinet Minister: School Education; Higher and Technical Education; Sports and Youth Welfare; Disaster Management	Vilasrao Deshmukh	4 March 1990	24 June 1991	INC
Cabinet Minister: Agriculture; Horticulture; Relief & Rehabilitation; Public Works (Including Public Undertakings)	Shivajirao Deshmukh	4 March 1990	24 June 1991	INC
Cabinet Minister: Public Works (Excluding Public Undertakings); Transport; Woman and Child Development	Vijaysinh Mohite-Patil	4 March 1990	24 June 1991	INC
Cabinet Minister: Housing; Slum Improvement; Housing Repair and Reconstruction; Special Assistance; Minority Development and Aukaf; Food and Drug Administration	Javed Khan	4 March 1990	24 June 1991	INC
Cabinet Minister: Public Health and Family Welfare; Medical Education and Drugs; Cultural Affairs	Pushpatai Hirey	4 March 1990	24 June 1991	INC
Cabinet Minister: Cooperation; Prohibition; Excise; Marketing; Other Backward Bahujan Welfare	Shankarrao Kolhe	4 March 1990	24 June 1991	INC
Cabinet Minister: Industries; Skill Development, Entrepreneurship	Bharat Bondre	4 March 1990	24 June 1991	INC
Cabinet Minister: Social Welfare; Employment Guarantee Scheme	Ramdas Athawale	4 March 1990	24 June 1991	RPI(A)
Cabinet Minister: Forests; Social Forestry; Mining Department	Sharad Pawar	4 March 1990	25 January 1991	INC
Cabinet Minister: Forests; Social Forestry; Mining Department	Datta Meghe	25 January 1991	24 June 1991	INC
Cabinet Minister: Energy; Ports Development; Panchayat Raj	Padamsinh Patil	4 March 1990	25 January 1991	INC
Cabinet Minister: Energy; Ports Development; Panchayat Raj	Datta Meghe	25 January 1991	24 June 1991	INC
Cabinet Minister: Rural Development; Earthquake Rehabilitation	Shivajirao Deshmukh	4 March 1990	25 January 1991	INC
Cabinet Minister: Rural Development; Earthquake Rehabilitation	Abhaysinh Raje Bhosale	25 January 1991	24 June 1991	INC
Cabinet Minister: Food and Civil Supplies; Majority Welfare Development	Surupsingh Hirya Naik	4 March 1990	25 January 1991	INC
Cabinet Minister: Food and Civil Supplies; Majority Welfare Development	Jawaharlal Darda	25 January 1991	24 June 1991	INC
Cabinet Minister: Textiles; Khar Land Development; Ex. Servicemen Welfare; Soil and Water Conservation	N. M. Kamble	4 March 1990	25 January 1991	INC
Cabinet Minister: Textiles; Khar Land Development; Ex. Servicemen Welfare; Soil and Water Conservation	Jawaharlal Darda	25 January 1991	24 June 1991	INC
Cabinet Minister: Environment; Protocol; Nomadic Tribes	Sharad Pawar	4 March 1990	25 January 1991	INC
Cabinet Minister: Environment; Protocol; Nomadic Tribes	Jawaharlal Darda	25 January 1991	24 June 1991	INC
Cabinet Minister: Animal Husbandry; Dairy Development; Fisheries; Tourism	Vilasrao Deshmukh	4 March 1990	25 January 1991	INC
Cabinet Minister: Animal Husbandry; Dairy Development; Fisheries; Tourism	Anantrao Thopate	25 January 1991	24 June 1991	INC
