= Sangamner Assembly constituency =

Constituency of the Maharashtra legislative assembly in India

Coordinates: 19.58°N 74.21°E

Sangamner
- Constituency No. 217 for the Maharashtra Legislative Assembly

Constituency details
- Country: India
- Region: Western India
- State: Maharashtra
- District: Ahmednagar
- Lok Sabha constituency: Shirdi
- Established: 1957
- Total electors: 289,934
- Reservation: None

Member of Legislative Assembly
- 15th Maharashtra Legislative Assembly
- Incumbent Amol Khatal
- Party: SHS
- Alliance: NDA
- Elected year: 2024

Sangamner Assembly constituency is one of the 288 Vidhan Sabha (Legislative Assembly) constituencies of Maharashtra state in Western India.

== Overview ==
Sangamner (constituency number 217) is one of the twelve Vidhan Sabha constituencies located in Ahilyanagar district. It comprises part of Rahata tehsil and the entire Sangamner tehsil of the district.

Sangamner is part of Shirdi Lok Sabha constituency along with five other Vidhan Sabha constituencies in this district, namely Akole, Shirdi, Kopargaon, Shrirampur and Nevasa.

== Members of the Legislative Assembly ==
Election	Member	Party
1957	Deshmukh Datta Appaji; Navali Narayan Ramji (St)	Independent politician
1962	B. J. Khatal Patil	Indian National Congress
1967	B. J. Khatal Patil	Indian National Congress
1972	B. J. Khatal Patil	Indian National Congress
1978	Balasaheb Thorat	Indian National Congress
1980	B. J. Khatal Patil	Indian National Congress
1985	Balasaheb Thorat	Independent politician
1990	Balasaheb Thorat	Indian National Congress
1995	Balasaheb Thorat	Indian National Congress
1999	Balasaheb Thorat	Indian National Congress
2004	Balasaheb Thorat	Indian National Congress
2009	Balasaheb Thorat	Indian National Congress
2014	Balasaheb Thorat	Indian National Congress
2019	Balasaheb Thorat	Indian National Congress
2024	Amol Khatal Patil	Shiv Sena

== Election results ==
=== Assembly Election 2024 ===
2024 Maharashtra Legislative Assembly election : Sangamner
Party	Candidate	Votes	%	±%
SHS	Amol Khatal-Patil	112,386	51.29	▲18.59
INC	Balasaheb Thorat	1,01,826	46.47	▼18.48
VBA	Abdulaziz Ahmedsharif Vohara	2,069	0.94	▼0.04
NOTA	None of the Above	1,470	0.67	▼0.21
Margin of victory		10,560	4.82	▼27.43
Turnout		2,20,581	76.08	▲4.21
Total valid votes		2,19,111		
Registered electors		2,89,934		▲7.18
SHS gain from INC		Swing	▼13.66	

=== Assembly Election 2019 ===
2019 Maharashtra Legislative Assembly election : Sangamner
Party	Candidate	Votes	%	±%
INC	Vijay Bhausaheb Thorat	125,380	64.95	▲7.67
SS	Navale Sahebrao Ramchandra	63,128	32.70	▲7.95
VBA	Bapusaheb Bhagvat Tajane	1,897	0.98	New
NOTA	None of the Above	1,692	0.88	▲0.17
MNS	Sharad Dnyandev Gorde	1,182	0.61	New
Margin of victory		62,252	32.25	▼0.28
Turnout		1,94,902	72.05	▲0.16
Total valid votes		1,93,041		
Registered electors		2,70,499		▲6.53
INC hold		Swing	▲7.67	

=== Assembly Election 2014 ===
2014 Maharashtra Legislative Assembly election : Sangamner
Party	Candidate	Votes	%	±%
INC	Vijay Bhausaheb Thorat	103,564	57.28	▼5.86
SS	Aher Janardan Mhatarba	44,759	24.76	▼2.22
BJP	Rajesh Madhav Chaudahari	25,007	13.83	New
NCP	Abasaheb Sambhajirao Thorat	2,650	1.47	New
BSP	Adv. Aher Prakash Kachru	1,394	0.77	New
NOTA	None of the Above	1,273	0.70	New
Margin of victory		58,805	32.52	▼3.64
Turnout		1,82,232	71.77	▲4.40
Total valid votes		1,80,803		
Registered electors		2,53,927		▲10.76
INC hold		Swing	▼5.86	

=== Assembly Election 2009 ===
2009 Maharashtra Legislative Assembly election : Sangamner
Party	Candidate	Votes	%	±%
INC	Vijay Bhausaheb Thorat	96,686	63.14	▼7.90
SS	Kute Babasaheb Dhondiba	41,310	26.98	▲0.76
Samajwadi Jan Parishad	Adv.Nishatai Shiurkar	4,227	2.76	New
Independent	Randhir Bapu Paraji	2,772	1.81	New
Independent	Dr. Dere Bhanudas Genuji	2,575	1.68	New
Independent	Ramdas Laxman Suralkar	1,443	0.94	New
Independent	Pande Suman Subhash	1,280	0.84	New
Margin of victory		55,376	36.16	▼8.67
Turnout		1,53,267	66.86	▼5.80
Total valid votes		1,53,134		
Registered electors		2,29,249		▼1.51
INC hold		Swing	▼7.90	

=== Assembly Election 2004 ===
2004 Maharashtra Legislative Assembly election : Sangamner
Party	Candidate	Votes	%	±%
INC	Vijay Bhausaheb Thorat	120,058	71.04	▲25.72
SS	Sambhajirao Ramchandra Thorat	44,301	26.21	▼3.42
BSP	Suryabhan Baburao Gore	4,636	2.74	New
Margin of victory		75,757	44.83	▲29.14
Turnout		1,69,033	72.62	▲2.36
Total valid votes		1,68,995		
Registered electors		2,32,771		▲19.58
INC hold		Swing	▲25.72	

=== Assembly Election 1999 ===
1999 Maharashtra Legislative Assembly election : Sangamner
Party	Candidate	Votes	%	±%
INC	Vijay Bhausaheb Thorat	61,975	45.32	▼5.65
SS	Gulve Bapusaheb Namdeo	40,524	29.64	▲28.29
NCP	Shinde Krishnarao Alias Dilip Sayaram	30,799	22.52	New
CPI	Jadhav Shivnath Sakharam	2,589	1.89	New
Margin of victory		21,451	15.69	▲5.54
Turnout		1,44,639	74.30	▼6.46
Total valid votes		1,36,738		
Registered electors		1,94,656		▲3.38
INC hold		Swing	▼5.65	

=== Assembly Election 1995 ===
1995 Maharashtra Legislative Assembly election : Sangamner
Party	Candidate	Votes	%	±%
INC	Vijay Bhausaheb Thorat	73,611	50.97	▲1.30
Independent	Gulave Bapusaheb Namdeo	58,957	40.82	New
JD	Navale Sahebrao Ramchandra	6,779	4.69	▲3.21
SS	Ithape Arun Damu	1,949	1.35	New
Independent	Gaikwad Ramesh Lahuji	876	0.61	New
Margin of victory		14,654	10.15	▲5.94
Turnout		1,48,142	78.68	▲8.01
Total valid votes		1,44,423		
Registered electors		1,88,292		▲11.79
INC hold		Swing	▲1.30	

=== Assembly Election 1990 ===
1990 Maharashtra Legislative Assembly election : Sangamner
Party	Candidate	Votes	%	±%
INC	Vijay Bhausaheb Thorat	57,465	49.67	▲16.48
BJP	Gunjal Vasantrao Sakharam	52,603	45.47	New
JD	Sawant Dashrath Namdeo	1,713	1.48	New
Independent	Asha Bapusaheb Bhangare	1,328	1.15	New
Doordarshi Party	Patil Kisan Bhadu	838	0.72	New
Margin of victory		4,862	4.20	▼7.01
Turnout		1,17,455	69.73	▼1.50
Total valid votes		1,15,697		
Registered electors		1,68,434		▲30.53
INC gain from Independent		Swing	▲5.26	

=== Assembly Election 1985 ===
1985 Maharashtra Legislative Assembly election : Sangamner
Party	Candidate	Votes	%	±%
Independent	Vijay Bhausaheb Thorat	40,218	44.40	New
INC	Thorat Shakuntala Khanderao	30,059	33.19	New
IC(S)	Andhale Gangadhar Bajaba	15,208	16.79	New
CPI	Sonawane Trimbakrao Gangadhar	3,135	3.46	New
Independent	Varpe Kisan Vithoba	955	1.05	New
Margin of victory		10,159	11.22	▲8.45
Turnout		92,314	71.54	▲7.70
Total valid votes		90,573		
Registered electors		1,29,034		▲9.36
Independent gain from INC(I)		Swing	▼6.98	

=== Assembly Election 1980 ===
1980 Maharashtra Legislative Assembly election : Sangamner
Party	Candidate	Votes	%	±%
INC(I)	B. J. Khatal-Patil	37,885	51.38	New
Independent	Thorat Sambhaji Ramchandra	35,845	48.62	New
Margin of victory		2,040	2.77	▲1.34
Turnout		75,105	63.66	▼10.52
Total valid votes		73,730		
Registered electors		1,17,986		▲11.89
INC(I) gain from INC		Swing	▲7.70	

=== Assembly Election 1978 ===
1978 Maharashtra Legislative Assembly election : Sangamner
Party	Candidate	Votes	%	±%
INC	Vijay Bhausaheb Thorat	33,627	43.68	▼33.49
JP	B. J. Khatal-Patil	32,526	42.25	New
CPI	Sonawane Trymbakrao Gangadhar	5,805	7.54	New
Independent	Patel Hyder Mohommed	1,940	2.52	New
Independent	Gunjan Tukaram Jijaba	1,545	2.01	New
Independent	Haribhau Kisan Gadekar	1,061	1.38	New
Independent	Wale Dadasaheb Baban	477	0.62	New
Margin of victory		1,101	1.43	▼58.47
Turnout		79,449	75.35	▲14.62
Total valid votes		76,981		
Registered electors		1,05,445		▼0.26
INC hold		Swing	▼33.49	

=== Assembly Election 1972 ===
1972 Maharashtra Legislative Assembly election : Sangamner
Party	Candidate	Votes	%	±%
INC	B. J. Khatal Patil	47,634	77.17	▲28.41
Independent	Gade Mohanrao Abasaheb	10,660	17.27	New
ABJS	Laxmikant Deshpande	2,991	4.85	▲0.02
Margin of victory		36,974	59.90	▲57.54
Turnout		64,051	60.58	▼8.03
Total valid votes		61,724		
Registered electors		1,05,721		▲18.40
INC hold		Swing	▲28.41	

=== Assembly Election 1967 ===
1967 Maharashtra Legislative Assembly election : Sangamner
Party	Candidate	Votes	%	±%
INC	B. J. Khatal Patil	28,919	48.76	▲8.94
SSP	B. G. Durve	27,521	46.41	New
ABJS	S. N. Jaju	2,863	4.83	New
Margin of victory		1,398	2.36	▲0.12
Turnout		63,120	70.69	▲7.31
Total valid votes		59,303		
Registered electors		89,294		▲24.71
INC hold		Swing	▲8.94	

=== Assembly Election 1962 ===
1962 Maharashtra Legislative Assembly election : Sangamner
Party	Candidate	Votes	%	±%
INC	B. J. Khatal Patil	16,854	39.83	▲28.86
Independent	Datta Appaji Deshmukh	15,907	37.59	New
PSP	Bhaskar Govindrao Durve	9,558	22.59	New
Margin of victory		947	2.24	▲1.78
Turnout		45,536	63.59	▼28.22
Total valid votes		42,319		
Registered electors		71,604		▼41.25
INC gain from Independent		Swing	▲11.43	

=== Assembly Election 1957 ===
1957 Bombay State Legislative Assembly election : Sangamner
Party	Candidate	Votes	%	±%
Independent	Navali Narayan Ramji (St)	30,219	28.39	New
Independent	Deshmukh Datta Appaji	29,733	27.94	New
Independent	Nagare Rambhan Sakharam	13,472	12.66	New
INC	Deshmukh Sagaji Narayan (St)	11,667	10.96	New
Independent	Bhangare Gopala Dhondu (St)	10,517	9.88	New
INC	Thorat Shivrao Bhavanrao	8,836	8.30	New
Independent	Sabale Pandurang Dhavalaji (St)	1,984	1.86	New
Margin of victory		486	0.46	
Turnout		1,06,428	87.33	
Total valid votes		1,06,428		
Registered electors		1,21,875		
Independent win (new seat)				

== See also ==
- Sangamner
- List of constituencies of Maharashtra Vidhan Sabha
