= Nagpur South West Assembly constituency =

Coordinates: 21.09°N 79.05°E

Nagpur South West
- Constituency No. 52 for the Maharashtra Legislative Assembly
- Devendra Fadnavis, present MLA of Nagpur south west

Constituency details
- Country: India
- Region: Western India
- State: Maharashtra
- District: Nagpur
- Lok Sabha constituency: Nagpur
- Established: 2008
- Total electors: 411,497
- Reservation: None

Member of Legislative Assembly
- 15th Maharashtra Legislative Assembly
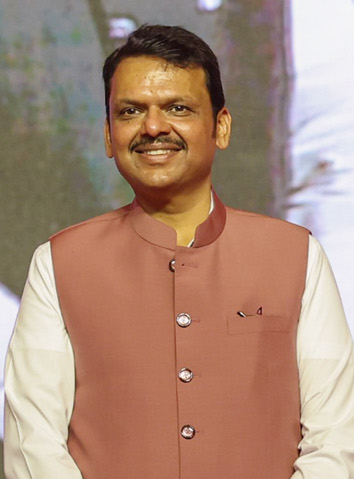
- Incumbent Devendra Fadnavis; Chief Minister of Maharashtra
- Party: BJP
- Alliance: NDA
- Elected year: 2024

Nagpur South West Assembly constituency is one of the seats in Maharashtra Legislative Assembly in India. It is one of the six Vidhan Sabha constituencies of Nagpur Lok Sabha constituency.

== Members of Legislative Assembly ==
Year	Name	Party
Until 2008: Constituency did not exist
2009	Devendra Fadnavis	Bharatiya Janata Party
2014	Devendra Fadnavis	Bharatiya Janata Party
2019	Devendra Fadnavis	Bharatiya Janata Party
2024	Devendra Fadnavis	Bharatiya Janata Party

== Election results ==
=== Assembly Election 2024 ===
2024 Maharashtra Legislative Assembly election : Nagpur South West
Party	Candidate	Votes	%	±%
BJP	Devendra Fadnavis	129,401	57.36	▼0.42
INC	Prafulla Gudadhe	89,691	39.76	▲8.08
VBA	Vinay Bhange	2,728	1.21	▼3.46
BSP	Surendra Dongre	2,717	1.20	▼2.84
NOTA	None of the Above	1,882	0.83	▼0.79
Margin of victory		39,710	17.60	▼8.50
Turnout		227,484	55.28	▲5.64
Total valid votes		225,602		
Registered electors		411,497		▲7.06
BJP hold		Swing	▼0.42	

=== Assembly Election 2019 ===
2019 Maharashtra Legislative Assembly election : Nagpur South West
Party	Candidate	Votes	%	±%
BJP	Devendra Fadnavis	109,237	57.78	▼1.74
INC	Ashish Deshmukh	59,893	31.68	▲2.96
VBA	Ravindra Shende	8,821	4.67	New
BSP	Vivek Hadke	7,646	4.04	▼4.60
NOTA	None of the Above	3,064	1.62	▲1.09
Margin of victory		49,344	26.10	▼4.70
Turnout		192,261	50.02	▼6.89
Total valid votes		189,054		
Registered electors		384,355		▲12.62
BJP hold		Swing	▼1.74	

=== Assembly Election 2014 ===
2014 Maharashtra Legislative Assembly election : Nagpur South West
Party	Candidate	Votes	%	±%
BJP	Devendra Fadnavis	113,918	59.52	▲8.50
INC	Prafulla Gudadhe	54,976	28.73	▼6.42
BSP	Rajendra Padole	16,540	8.64	New
SS	Panju Totwani	2,767	1.45	New
NOTA	None of the Above	1,014	0.53	New
Margin of victory		58,942	30.80	▲14.92
Turnout		192,639	56.44	▲6.23
Total valid votes		191,386		
Registered electors		341,300		▼2.77
BJP hold		Swing	▲8.50	

=== Assembly Election 2009 ===
2009 Maharashtra Legislative Assembly election : Nagpur South West
Party	Candidate	Votes	%	±%
BJP	Devendra Fadnavis	89,258	51.02	New
INC	Vikas Thakre	61,483	35.14	New
BBM	Raju Lokhande	10,533	6.02	New
Independent	Umakant Deotale	8,337	4.77	New
Independent	Sunil Zodape	1,618	0.92	New
RPI(A)	Jaideep Kawade	1,438	0.82	New
Margin of victory		27,775	15.88	
Turnout		175,156	49.90	
Total valid votes		174,955		
Registered electors		351,021		
BJP win (new seat)				

== See also ==
- List of constituencies of Maharashtra Vidhan Sabha
