= Sudhakarrao Naik =

Indian politician (1934–2001)

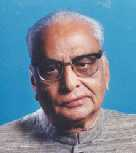

11th Chief Minister of Maharashtra
- In office 25 June 1991 – 22 February 1993
- Preceded by: Sharad Pawar
- Succeeded by: Sharad Pawar

10th Governor of Himachal Pradesh
- In office 30 July 1994 – 17 September 1995
- Preceded by: Viswanathan Ratnam
- Succeeded by: Mahabir Prasad

Member of the Indian Parliament for Washim
- In office 1998–1999
- Preceded by: Pundlikrao Gawali
- Succeeded by: Bhavana Pundlikrao Gawali

Member of the Maharashtra Legislative Assembly for Pusad
- In office 1978–1995
- Preceded by: Vasantrao Naik
- Succeeded by: Manohar Naik
- In office 1999–2001
- Preceded by: Manohar Naik
- Succeeded by: Manohar Naik

Cabinet Minister in Third Vasantdada Patil ministry
- In office Feb 1983 – March 1985
- Minister: Education, Dairy Development, and Animal Husbandry.

Cabinet Minister in Nilangekar ministry
- In office March 1985 – March 1986
- Minister: Industries, Revenue & Social Welfare.

Cabinet Minister in Second Pawar ministry
- In office June 1988 – March 1990
- Minister: Social Welfare, Energy & Parliamentary Affairs.

Cabinet Minister in Third Pawar ministry
- In office March 1990 – June 1991
- Minister: Revenue & Parliamentary Affairs.

Cabinet Minister Government of Maharashtra
- In office 1978–1980
- Minister: Minister of Housing, Animal husbandry & fisheries.

Personal details
- Born: 21 August 1931 Gahuli, Central Provinces and Berar, British India
- Died: 10 May 2001 (aged 66) Mumbai, Maharashtra, India
- Party: Indian National Congress; Nationalist Congress Party

Sudhakarrao Rajusing Naik (21 August 1934 – 10 May 2001) was an Indian politician from Indian National Congress party who served as Chief Minister of Maharashtra from 25 June 1991 until 22 February 1993 following the communal riots. He also served as Governor of Himachal Pradesh from 1994 to 1995 He had given the new shape to the Panchayat Raj, started the continuous election process in Panchayat Raj systems all over the state, as desired by the former Prime Minister Rajeev Gandhi, decentralisation of power and faster decision making process being motive of bringing back the Panchayat Raj in full-fledged functioning. He is called as the hero of Jalkranti, who started the irrigation revolution in the State of Maharashtra.

== Career ==
He started his political career from his rural base as Sarpanch or village head. He was Member of Legislative Assembly for Maharashtra Vidhan Sabha from Pusad 5 times winning elections of 1978, 1980, 1985, 1990 and 1999 elections. He was the Chief Minister during the Mumbai riots of 1992–1993.

However, politically, his differences with Sharad Pawar grew, and ultimately he had to resign. At one point, Sudhakarrao made a statement that Sharad Pawar had asked him to "go easy on Pappu Kalani".

He is also remembered for his work in water conservation.

He served as Governor of Himachal Pradesh from 30 July 1994 to 17 September 1995. In 1998, he was elected as Member of Parliament to the 12th Lok Sabha from Washim.

== Personal life ==
Sudhakarrao Rajusing Naik was born on 21 August 1934 in Gahuli village, Yavatmal region of Maharashtra in a Banjara tribal family. He was the nephew of former Maharashtra chief minister Vasantrao Naik.

| Preceded by Sharad Pawar | Chief Minister of Maharashtra; 25 June 1991 – 22 February 1993 | Succeeded by Sharad Pawar |
