= Ministry of State Excise (Maharashtra) =

Maharashtra government ministry responsible for State Excise

Ministry of State Excise Government of Maharashtra
- मंत्रालय राज्य उत्पादन शुल्क विभाग, महाराष्ट्र शासन
- Seal of the state of Maharashtra

- Building of Administrative Headquarters of Mumbai

Ministry overview
- Jurisdiction: (India) Maharashtra
- Headquarters: Mantralay, Mumbai
- Minister responsible: Sunetra Ajit Pawar, Deputy Chief Minister and Minister for State Excise
- Deputy Minister responsible: Vacant, TBD since 29 June 2022, Minister of State
- Ministry executive: (IAS)
- Parent department: Government of Maharashtra

The Ministry of State Excise is a ministry of the Government of Maharashtra. It is responsible for preparing annual plans for the development of Maharashtra state.

The Ministry is headed by a cabinet level Minister. Sunetra Ajit Pawar Deputy Chief Minister and Minister for State Excise.

== Head office ==
Minister of State Excise राज्य उत्पादन शुल्क मंत्री
- Emblem of India

- Flag of India
- Incumbent; Sunetra Ajit Pawar (Deputy Chief Minister) since 31 January 2026
- Ministry of State Excise (Maharashtra)
- Style: The Honourable
- Abbreviation: Cabinet Minister
- Member of: State Cabinet
- Reports to: Chief Minister, Maharashtra Legislature
- Seat: Mantralaya, Mumbai
- Appointer: Governor on the advice of the Chief Minister
- Term length: 5 years
- Precursor: Devendra Fadnavis (2026-2026)
- Inaugural holder: T. R. Narawane (1960-1962)
- Formation: 1 May 1960
- Deputy: Vacant, TBD; since 29 June 2022
- Salary: ₹ - approximately

== Cabinet Ministers ==
| No. | Portrait | Minister (Constituency) | Term of office | | | Political party | Ministry | Chief Minister |
| No. | Portrait | Minister (Constituency) | From | To | Period | Political party | Ministry | Chief Minister |
Minister of State Excise
| 01 | | T. R. Narawane (MLA for Kurla Constituency No. 174- Mumbai Suburban District) (Legislative Assembly) | 01 May 1960 | 07 March 1962 | 1 year, 310 days | Indian National Congress | Yashwantrao I | Yashwantrao Chavan |
| 02 | | Balasaheb Desai (MLA for Patan Constituency No. 261- Satara District) (Legislative Assembly) | 08 March 1962 | 19 November 1962 | 256 days | Indian National Congress | Yashwantrao II | Yashwantrao Chavan |
| 03 | | Abdul Kader Salebhoy (MLA for Mumbai South Central Constituency No. 180- Mumbai City District) (Legislative Assembly) | 20 November 1962 | 24 November 1963 | 1 year, 4 days | Indian National Congress | Kannamwar l | Marotrao Kannamwar |
| 04 | | P. K. Sawant (MLA for Chiplun Constituency No. 265- Ratnagiri District) (Legislative Assembly) (Interim Chief Minister) | 25 November 1962 | 04 December 1963 | 9 days | Indian National Congress | Sawant I | P. K. Sawant |
| 05 | | D. S. Palaspagar (MLC for Elected by MLAs Constituency No. 19 - Bhandara District) (Legislative Council) | 05 December 1963 | 01 March 1967 | 3 years, 86 days | Indian National Congress | Vasantrao I | Vasantrao Naik |
| 06 | | Shantilal Shah (MLA for Vile Parle Constituency No. 177- Mumbai Suburban District (Legislative Assembly) | 01 March 1967 | 13 March 1972 | 5 years, 12 days | Indian National Congress | Vasantrao II | Vasantrao Naik |
| 07 | | Pratibha Patil (MLA for Jalgaon City Constituency No. 13- Jalgaon District) (Legislative Assembly) | 13 March 1972 | 21 February 1975 | 2 years, 345 days | Indian National Congress | Vasantrao III | Vasantrao Naik |
| 08 | | Vasantdada Patil (MLC for Elected by MLAs Constituency No. 20 - Sangli District) (Legislative Council) | 21 February 1975 | 17 May 1977 | 2 years, 85 days | Indian National Congress | Shankarrao I | Shankarrao Chavan |
| 09 | | Shankarrao Rakh (MLA for Badnapur Jalna Constituency No. 101- Jalna District) (Legislative Assembly) | 17 May 1977 | 07 March 1978 | 1 year, 294 days | Indian National Congress | Vasantdada I | Vasantdada Patil |
| 10 | | Vasantdada Patil (MLA for Sangli Constituency No. 282- Sangli District) (Legislative Assembly) (Chief Minister) | 07 March 1978 | 18 July 1978 | 133 days | Indian National Congress (U) | Vasantdada II | Vasantdada Patil |
| 11 | | Sadanand Shankar Varde (MLA for Vandre Constituency No. 176- Mumbai Suburban District) (Legislative Assembly) | 18 July 1978 | 17 February 1980 | 1 year, 214 days | Janata Party | Pawar I | Sharad Pawar |
| 12 | | Abdul Rahman Antulay (MLA for Shrivardhan Constituency No. 193- Raigad District) (Legislative Assembly) (Chief Minister) | 09 June 1980 | 21 January 1982 | 1 year, 226 days | Indian National Congress | Antulay | Abdul Rahman Antulay |
| 13 | | Babasaheb Bhosale (MLA for Nehrunagar Constituency No. 172- Mumbai Suburban District) (Legislative Assembly) (Chief Minister) | 21 January 1982 | 11 October 1982 | 263 days | Indian National Congress | Bhosale | Babasaheb Bhosale |
| 14 | | Pratibha Patil (MLA for Jalgaon City Constituency No. 13- Jalgaon District) (Legislative Assembly) | 11 October 1982 | 02 February 1983 | 114 days | Indian National Congress | Bhosale | Babasaheb Bhosale |
| 15 | | Baliram Waman Hiray (MLA for Dabhadi Constituency No. 74- Nashik District) (Legislative Assembly) | 07 February 1983 | 05 March 1985 | 2 years, 26 days | Indian National Congress | Vasantdada III | Vasantdada Patil |
| 16 | | V. Subramanian (MLA for South Mumbai Constituency No. 121- Mumbai City District) (Legislative Assembly) | 12 March 1985; 1960 | 03 June 1985; 1962 | 83 days | Indian National Congress | Vasantdada IV | Vasantdada Patil |
| 17 | | Jawaharlal Darda (MLC for Elected by MLAs Constituency No. 19 - Yavatmal District) (Legislative Council) | 03 June 1985 | 12 March 1986 | 282 days | Indian National Congress | Nilangekar | Shivajirao Patil Nilangekar |
| 18 | | Shankarrao Chavan (MLC for Elected by MLAs Constituency No. 08 - Nanded District) (Legislative Council) (Chief Minister) | 12 March 1986 | 26 June 1988 | 2 years, 106 days | Indian National Congress | Shankarrao II | Shankarrao Chavan |
| 19 | | Chhedilal Gupta (MLA for Gondiya Constituency No. 134- Gondiya District) (Legislative Assembly) | 26 June 1988 | 03 March 1990 | 1 year, 250 days | Indian National Congress | Pawar II | Sharad Pawar |
| 20 | | Shankarrao Genuji Kolhe (MLA for Kopargaon Constituency No. 219- Ahmednagar District) (Legislative Assembly) | 04 March 1990 | 25 June 1991 | 1 year, 113 days | Indian National Congress | Pawar III | Sharad Pawar |
| 21 | | Vijaysinh Mohite-Patil (MLA for Malshiras Constituency No. 254- Solapur District) (Legislative Assembly) | 25 June 1991 | 30 December 1991 | 188 days | Indian National Congress | Sudhakarrao | Sudhakarrao Naik |
| 22 | | Shankarrao Genuji Kolhe (MLA for Kopargaon Constituency No. 219- Ahmednagar District) (Legislative Assembly) | 30 December 1991 | 22 February 1993 | 1 year, 54 days | Indian National Congress | Sudhakarrao | Sudhakarrao Naik |
| 23 | | Sharad Pawar (MLA for Baramati Constituency No. 201- Pune District) (Legislative Assembly) (Chief Minister) | 06 March 1993 | 14 March 1995 | 2 years, 8 days | Indian National Congress | Pawar IV | Sharad Pawar |
| 24 | | Jagannath Patil (MLA for Kalyan Constituency No. 145- Thane District) (Legislative Assembly) | 14 March 1995 | 31 January 1999 | 3 years, 323 days | Bharatiya Janata Party | Joshi | Manohar Joshi |
| 25 | | Narayan Rane (MLA for Malvan Constituency No. 269- Sindhudurg District) (Legislative Assembly) (Chief Minister) | 01 February 1999 | 11 May 1999 | 99 days | Shiv Sena | Rane | Narayan Rane |
| 26 | | Anna Dange (MLC for Elected by MLAs Constituency No. 05 - Sangli District) (Legislative Council) | 11 May 1999 | 17 October 1999 | 159 days | Bharatiya Janata Party | Rane | Narayan Rane |
| 27 | | Vasant Chavan (MLC for Governor Nominated Constituency No. 11 - Pune District) (Legislative Council) | 19 October 1999 | 16 January 2003 | 3 years, 88 days | Nationalist Congress Party | Deshmukh I | Vilasrao Deshmukh |
| 28 | | Sushilkumar Shinde (MLA for Solapur South Constituency No. 251- Solapur District) (Legislative Assembly) (Chief Minister) | 18 January 2003 | 01 November 2004 | 1 year, 295 days | Indian National Congress | Sushilkumar | Sushilkumar Shinde |
| 29 | | Ganesh Naik (MLA for Belapur Constituency No. 151- Thane District) (Legislative Assembly) | 09 November 2004 | 01 December 2007 | 4 years, 22 days | Nationalist Congress Party | Deshmukh II | Vilasrao Deshmukh |
| 30 | | Ganesh Naik (MLA for Belapur Constituency No. 151- Thane District) (Legislative Assembly) | 08 December 2008 | 06 November 2009 | 333 days | Nationalist Congress Party | Ashok I | Ashok Chavan |
| 31 | | Ganesh Naik (MLA for Belapur Constituency No. 151- Thane District) (Legislative Assembly) | 07 November 2009 | 10 November; 201p | 1 year, 3 days | Nationalist Congress Party | Ashok II | Ashok Chavan |
| 32 | | Prithviraj Chavan (MLC for Elected by MLAs Constituency No. 19 - Satara District) (Legislative Council) (Chief Minister) | 11 November 2010 | 20 January 2012 | 1 year, 70 days | Indian National Congress | Prithviraj | Prithviraj Chavan |
| 33 | | Ganesh Naik (MLA for Belapur Constituency No. 151- Thane District) (Legislative Assembly) | 20 January 2012 | 02 August 2014 | 2 years, 194 days | Nationalist Congress Party | Prithviraj | Prithviraj Chavan |
| 34 | | Prithviraj Chavan (MLC for Elected by MLAs Constituency No. 19 - Satara District) (Legislative Council) (Chief Minister) | 02 August 2014 | 26 September 2014 | 55 days | Indian National Congress | Prithviraj | Prithviraj Chavan |
| 35 | | Eknath Khadse (MLA for Muktainagar Constituency No. 20- Jalgaon District) (Legislative Assembly) | 31 October 2014 | 04 June 2016 | 1 year, 217 days | Bharatiya Janata Party | Fadnavis I | Devendra Fadnavis |
| 36 | | Devendra Fadnavis (MLA for Nagpur South West Constituency No. 52- Nagpur District) (Legislative Assembly) (Chief Minister) (In Charge) | 04 June 2016 | 08 July 2016 | 30 days | Bharatiya Janata Party | Fadnavis I | Devendra Fadnavis |
| 37 | | Chandrashekhar Bawankule (MLA for Kamthi Constituency No. 58- Nagpur District) (Legislative Assembly) | 08 July 2016 | 12 November 2019 | 3 years, 127 days | Bharatiya Janata Party | Fadnavis I | Devendra Fadnavis |
| 38 | | Devendra Fadnavis (MLA for Nagpur South West Constituency No. 52- Nagpur District) (Legislative Assembly) (Chief Minister) (In Charge) | 23 November 2019 | 28 November 2019 | 5 days | Bharatiya Janata Party | Fadnavis II | Devendra Fadnavis |
| 39 | | Chhagan Bhujbal (MLA for Yevla Constituency No. 119- Nashik District) (Legislative Assembly) | 28 November 2019 | 30 December 2019 | 32 days | Nationalist Congress Party | Thackeray | Uddhav Thackeray |
| 40 | | Dilip Walse-Patil (MLA for Ambegaon Constituency No. 196- Pune District) (Legislative Assembly) | 30 December 2019 | 05 April 2021 | 1 year, 96 days | Nationalist Congress Party | Thackeray | Uddhav Thackeray |
| 41 | | Ajit Pawar (MLA for Baramati Constituency No. 201- Pune District) (Legislative Assembly) (Deputy Chief Minister) | 05 April 2021 | 29 June 2022 | 1 year, 85 days | Nationalist Congress Party | Thackeray | Uddhav Thackeray |
| 42 | | Eknath Shinde (MLA for Kopri-Pachpakhadi Constituency No. 147- Thane District) (Legislative Assembly) (Chief Minister) (In Charge) | 30 June 2022 | 14 August 2022 | 45 days | Shiv Sena (2022–present) | Eknath | Eknath Shinde |
| 43 | | Shambhuraj Desai (MLA for Patan Constituency No. 261- Satara District) (Legislative Assembly) | 14 August 2022 | 26 November 2024 | 2 years, 104 days | Shiv Sena (2022–present) | Eknath | Eknath Shinde |
| 44 | | Devendra Fadnavis (MLA for Nagpur South West Constituency No. 52- Nagpur District) (Legislative Assembly) (Chief_Minister); In Charge | 05 December 2024 | 21 December 2024 | 16 days | Bharatiya Janata Party | Fadnavis III | Devendra Fadnavis |
| 45 | | Ajit Pawar (MLA for Baramati Constituency No. 201- Pune District (Legislative Assembly) (Deputy Chief Minister) | 21 December 2024 | 28 January 2026 | 1 year, 38 days | Nationalist Congress Party (Ajit Pawar Group) | Fadnavis III | Devendra Fadnavis |
| 46 | | Devendra Fadnavis (MLA for Nagpur South West Constituency No. 52- Nagpur District) (Legislative Assembly) (Chief Minister); Additional Charge | 28 January 2026 | 31 January 2026 | 3 days | Bharatiya Janata Party | Fadnavis III | Devendra Fadnavis |
| 47 | | Sunetra Ajit Pawar (Not Elected Any Constituency of Maharashtra Legislature- Pune District) (Legislative Assembly / Legislative Council) (Deputy Chief Minister) | 31 January 2026 | Incumbent | 220 days | Nationalist Congress Party (Ajit Pawar Group) | Fadnavis III | Devendra Fadnavis |

== Ministers of State ==
| No. | Portrait | Deputy Minister (Constituency) | Term of office | | | Political party | Ministry | Minister | Chief Minister |
| No. | Portrait | Deputy Minister (Constituency) | From | To | Period | Political party | Ministry | Minister | Chief Minister |
Deputy Minister of State Excise
| Vacant | | | 23 November 2019 | 28 November 2019 | 5 days | NA | Fadnavis II | Devendra Fadnavis | Devendra Fadnavis |
| 01 | | Shambhuraj Desai (MLA for Patan Constituency No. 261- Satara District) (Legislative Assembly) | 30 December 2019 | 27 June 2022 | 2 years, 179 days | Shiv Sena | Thackeray | Dilip Walse-Patil (2019 - 2021); Ajit Pawar (2021 - 2022) | Uddhav Thackeray |
| 02 | | Satej Patil (MLC for Elected by Kolhapur Local Authorities Constituency No. 06 - Kolhapur District) (Legislative Council); Additional_Charge | 27 June 2022 | 29 June 2022 | 2 days | Indian National Congress | Thackeray | Dilip Walse-Patil (2019 - 2021); Ajit Pawar (2021 - 2022) | Uddhav Thackeray |
| Vacant | | | 30 June 2022 | 26 November 2024 | 2 years, 149 days | NA | Eknath | Eknath Shinde (2022 - 2022); Shambhuraj Desai (2022–Present) | Eknath Shinde |
| Vacant | | | 21 December 2024 | incumbent | 1 year, 261 days | NA | Fadnavis III | Ajit Pawar (2024 – 2026); Devendra Fadnavis Additional Charge (2026 – 2026); Sunetra Pawar (2026 – Present) | Devendra Fadnavis |

== List Minister of Prohibition (1960 - 1995) ==
| No. | Portrait | Minister (Constituency) | Term of office | | | Political party | Ministry | Chief Minister |
| No. | Portrait | Minister (Constituency) | From | To | Period | Political party | Ministry | Chief Minister |
Minister of Prohibition
Starting Date 1 May 1960
| 01 | | T. R. Narawane (MLA for Kurla Constituency No. 174- Mumbai Suburban District) (Legislative Assembly) | 01 May 1960 | 07 March 1962 | 1 year, 310 days | Indian National Congress | Yashwantrao I | Yashwantrao Chavan |
| 02 | | Abdul Kader Salebhoy (MLA for Mumbai South Central Constituency No. 180- Mumbai City District) (Legislative Assembly) | 08 March 1962 | 19 November 1962 | 256 days | Indian National Congress | Yashwantrao II | Yashwantrao Chavan |
| 03 | | Abdul Kader Salebhoy (MLA for Mumbai South Central Constituency No. 180- Mumbai City District) (Legislative Assembly) | 20 November 1962 | 24 November 1963 | 1 year, 4 days | Indian National Congress | Kannamwar l | Marotrao Kannamwar |
| 04 | | P. K. Sawant (MLA for Chiplun Constituency No. 265- Ratnagiri District) (Legislative Assembly) (Interim Chief Minister) | 25 November 1962 | 04 December 1963 | 9 days | Indian National Congress | Sawant I | P. K. Sawant |
| 05 | | D. S. Palaspagar (MLC for Elected by MLAs Constituency No. 19 - Bhandara District) (Legislative Council) | 05 December 1963 | 01 March 1967 | 3 years, 86 days | Indian National Congress | Vasantrao I | Vasantrao Naik |
| 06 | | Shantilal Shah (MLA for Vile Parle Constituency No. 177- Mumbai Suburban District (Legislative Assembly) | 01 March 1967 | 13 March 1972 | 5 years, 12 days | Indian National Congress | Vasantrao II | Vasantrao Naik |
| 07 | | Rafique Zakaria (MLC for Elected by MLAs Constituency No. 16 - Mumbai Suburban District) (Legislative Council) | 13 March 1972 | 21 February 1975 | 2 years, 345 days | Indian National Congress | Vasantrao III | Vasantrao Naik |
| 08 | | Vasantdada Patil (MLC for Elected by MLAs Constituency No. 20 - Sangli District) (Legislative Council) | 21 February 1975 | 17 May 1977 | 2 years, 85 days | Indian National Congress | Shankarrao I | Shankarrao Chavan |
| 09 | | Shankarrao Rakh (MLA for Badnapur Jalna Constituency No. 101- Jalna District) (Legislative Assembly) | 17 May 1977 | 07 March 1978 | 1 year, 294 days | Indian National Congress | Vasantdada I | Vasantdada Patil |
| 10 | | Baburao Kale (MLA for Ghansavangi Jalna Constituency No. 190- Jalna District) (Legislative Assembly) | 07 March 1978 | 18 July 1978 | 133 days | Indian National Congress (U) | Vasantdada II | Vasantdada Patil |
| 11 | | Sadanand Shankar Varde (MLA for Vandre Constituency No. 176- Mumbai Suburban District) (Legislative Assembly) | 18 July 1978 | 17 February 1980 | 1 year, 214 days | Janata Party | Pawar I | Sharad Pawar |
| 12 | | Baliram Waman Hiray (MLA for Dabhadi Constituency No. 74- Nashik District) (Legislative Assembly) | 09 June 1980 | 21 January 1982 | 1 year, 226 days | Indian National Congress | Antulay | Abdul Rahman Antulay |
| 13 | | Babasaheb Bhosale (MLA for Nehrunagar Constituency No. 172- Mumbai Suburban District) (Legislative Assembly) (Chief Minister) | 21 January 1982 | 11 October 1982 | 263 days | Indian National Congress | Bhosale | Babasaheb Bhosale |
| 14 | | Pratibha Patil (MLA for Jalgaon City Constituency No. 13- Jalgaon District) (Legislative Assembly) | 11 October 1982 | 02 February 1983 | 114 days | Indian National Congress | Bhosale | Babasaheb Bhosale |
| 15 | | Baliram Waman Hiray (MLA for Dabhadi Constituency No. 74- Nashik District) (Legislative Assembly) | 07 February 1983 | 05 March 1985 | 2 years, 26 days | Indian National Congress | Vasantdada III | Vasantdada Patil |
| 16 | | V. Subramanian (MLA for South Mumbai Constituency No. 121- Mumbai City District) (Legislative Assembly) | 12 March 1985; 1960 | 03 June 1985; 1962 | 83 days | Indian National Congress | Vasantdada IV | Vasantdada Patil |
| 17 | | Jawaharlal Darda (MLC for Elected by MLAs Constituency No. 19 - Yavatmal District) (Legislative Council) | 03 June 1985 | 12 March 1986 | 282 days | Indian National Congress | Nilangekar | Shivajirao Patil Nilangekar |
| 18 | | Balachandra Sawant (MLC for Elected by MLAs Constituency No. 09 - Ratnagiri District) (Legislative Council) | 12 March 1986 | 26 June 1988 | 2 years, 106 days | Indian National Congress | Shankarrao II | Shankarrao Chavan |
| 19 | | Chhedilal Gupta (MLA for Gondiya Constituency No. 134- Gondiya District) (Legislative Assembly) | 26 June 1988 | 03 March 1990 | 1 year, 250 days | Indian National Congress | Pawar II | Sharad Pawar |
| 20 | | Shankarrao Genuji Kolhe (MLA for Kopargaon Constituency No. 219- Ahmednagar District) (Legislative Assembly) | 04 March 1990 | 25 June 1991 | 1 year, 113 days | Indian National Congress | Pawar III | Sharad Pawar |
| 21 | | Ramdas Athawale (MLC for Elected by MLAs Constituency No. 11 - Sangli District) (Legislative Council) | 25 June 1991 | 22 February 1993 | 1 year, 242 days | Republican Party of India (Athawale) | Sudhakarrao | Sudhakarrao Naik |
| 22 | | Ramdas Athawale (MLC for Elected by MLAs Constituency No. 11 - Sangli District) (Legislative Council) | 06 March 1993 | 14 March 1995 | 2 years, 8 days | Republican Party of India (Athawale) | Pawar IV | Sharad Pawar |
Dissolved and Ending Date 14 March 1995
