= Ministry of Marketing (Maharashtra) =

Maharashtra government ministry responsible for Marketing

Ministry of Marketing Government of Maharashtra
- मंत्रालय पणन विभाग, महाराष्ट्र शासन
- Seal of the state of Maharashtra

- Building of Administrative Headquarters of Mumbai

Ministry overview
- Jurisdiction: (India) Maharashtra
- Headquarters: Mantralay, Mumbai
- Minister responsible: Jayakumar Jitendrasinh Rawal, Cabinet Minister
- Deputy Minister responsible: Vacant, TBD since 29 June 2022, Minister of State
- Ministry executive: (IAS)
- Parent department: Government of Maharashtra

The Ministry of Marketing is a Ministry of the Government of Maharashtra.

The Ministry is headed by a cabinet level Minister. Jayakumar Jitendrasinh Rawal is Current Minister of Marketing Government of Maharashtra.

== Head office ==
Minister of Marketing मंत्री विपणन विभाग
- Emblem of India

- Flag of India

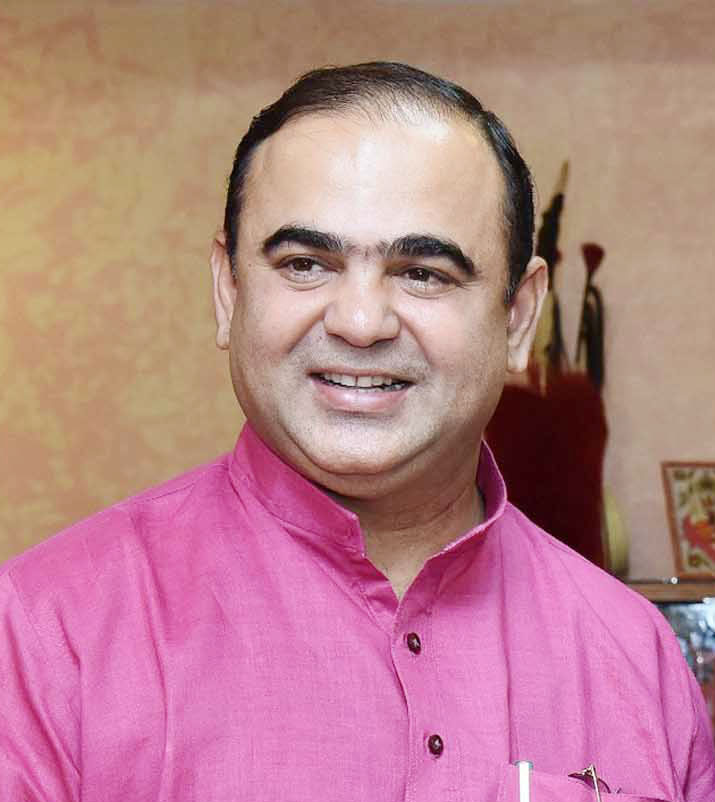
- Incumbent; Jayakumar Jitendrasinh Rawal since 21 December 2024
- Ministry of Marketing (Maharashtra)
- Style: The Honourable
- Abbreviation: Cabinet Minister
- Member of: State Cabinet
- Reports to: Chief Minister, Maharashtra Legislature
- Seat: Mantralaya, Mumbai
- Appointer: Governor on the advice of the Chief Minister
- Term length: 5 years
- Precursor: Devendra Fadnavis Chief Minister; (2024- 2024)
- Inaugural holder: M. G. Maney; (1960-1962)
- Formation: 1 May 1960
- Deputy: Vacant, TBD; since 29 June 2022

== Cabinet Ministers ==
No.	Portrait	Minister (Constituency)	Term of office			Political party	Ministry	Chief Minister
No.	Portrait	Minister (Constituency)	From	To	Period	Political party	Ministry	Chief Minister
Minister of Marketing
01		Shantilal Shah (MLA for Vile Parle Constituency No. 177- Mumbai Suburban District (Legislative Assembly)	01 May 1960	07 March 1962	1 year, 310 days	Indian National Congress	Yashwantrao I	Yashwantrao Chavan
02		M. G. Mane (MLC for Elected by MLAs Constituency No. 02 - Ahmednagar District) (Legislative Council)	08 March 1962	19 November 1962	256 days	Indian National Congress	Yashwantrao II	Yashwantrao Chavan
03		Marotrao Kannamwar (MLA for Saoli Constituency No. 73- Chandrapur District) (Legislative Assembly) (Chief Minister)	20 November 1962	24 November 1963	1 year, 4 days	Indian National Congress	Kannamwar l	Marotrao Kannamwar
04		P. K. Sawant (MLA for Chiplun Constituency No. 265- Ratnagiri District) (Legislative Assembly) (Interim Chief Minister)	25 November 1962	04 December 1963	9 days	Indian National Congress	Sawant	P. K. Sawant
05		Shankarrao Chavan (MLA for Bhokar Constituency No. 85- Nanded District) (Legislative Assembly)	05 December 1963	01 March 1967	3 years, 86 days	Indian National Congress	Vasantrao I	Vasantrao Naik
06		P. K. Sawant (MLA for Chiplun Constituency No. 265- Ratnagiri District) (Legislative Assembly)	01 March 1967	27 October 1969	2 years, 240 days	Indian National Congress	Vasantrao II	Vasantrao Naik
07		Pratibha Patil (MLA for Jalgaon City Constituency No. 13- Jalgaon District) (Legislative Assembly)	27 October 1969	13 March 1972	2 years, 138 days	Indian National Congress	Vasantrao II	Vasantrao Naik
08		Abdul Rahman Antulay (MLA for Shrivardhan Constituency No. 193- Raigad District) (Legislative Assembly)	13 March 1972	04 April 1973	1 year, 32 days	Indian National Congress	Vasantrao III	Vasantrao Naik
09		Vasantrao Patil (MLC for Elected by MLAs Constituency No. 20 - Sangli District) (Legislative Council)	04 April 1973	17 Match; 1974	347 days	Indian National Congress	Vasantrao III	Vasantrao Naik
10		Rafique Zakaria (MLC for Elected by MLAs Constituency No. 16 - Mumbai Suburban District) (Legislative Council)	17 Match; 1974	21 February 1975	341 days	Indian National Congress	Vasantrao III	Vasantrao Naik
11		Abdul Rahman Antulay (MLA for Shrivardhan Constituency No. 193- Raigad District) (Legislative Assembly)	21 February 1975	16 April 1977	2 years, 54 days	Indian National Congress	Shankarrao I	Shankarrao Chavan
12		Ratnappa Kumbhar (MLA for Shirol Constituency No. 280- Kolhapur District (Legislative Assembly)	17 April 1977	07 March 1978	1 year, 324 days	Indian National Congress	Vasantdada I	Vasantdada Patil
13		Baliram Waman Hiray (MLA for Dabhadi Constituency No. 74- Nashik District) (Legislative Assembly)	07 March 1978	18 July 1978	133 days	Indian National Congress	Vasantdada II	Vasantdada Patil
14		Hashu Advani (MLA for Chembur Constituency No. 173- Mumbai Suburban District) (Legislative Assembly)	18 July 1978	17 February 1980	1 year, 214 days	Janata Party	Pawar I	Sharad Pawar
15		Bhikajirao Jijaba Khatal-Patil (MLA for Sangamner Constituency No. 217- Ahmednagar District) (Legislative Assembly)	09 June 1980	21 January 1982	1 year, 226 days	Indian National Congress	Antulay	Abdul Rahman Antulay
16		Babasaheb Bhosale (MLA for Nehrunagar Constituency No. 172- Mumbai Suburban District) (Legislative Assembly) (Chief Minister)	21 January 1982	11 October 1982	263 days	Indian National Congress	Bhosale	Babasaheb Bhosale
17		Pratibha Patil (MLA for Jalgaon City Constituency No. 13- Jalgaon District) (Legislative Assembly)	11 October 1982	02 February 1983	114 days	Indian National Congress	Bhosale	Babasaheb Bhosale
18		Ramrao Adik (MLC for Elected by MLAs Constituency No. 05 - Ahmednagar District) (Legislative Council) (Deputy Chief Minister)	07 February 1983	05 March 1985	2 years, 26 days	Indian National Congress	Vasantdada III	Vasantdada Patil
19		V. Subramanian (MLA for South Mumbai Constituency No. 121- Mumbai City District) (Legislative Assembly)	12 March 1985	03 June 1985	83 days	Indian National Congress	Vasantdada IV	Vasantdada Patil
19		Shivajirao Patil Nilangekar (MLA for Nilanga Constituency No. 238- Latur District) (Legislative Assembly) (Chief Minister)	03 June 1985	12 March 1986	282 days	Indian National Congress	Nilangekar	Shivajirao Patil Nilangekar
20		Shankarrao Chavan (MLC for Elected by MLAs Constituency No. 08 - Nanded District) (Legislative Council) (Chief Minister)	12 March 1986	26 June 1988	2 years, 106 days	Indian National Congress	Shankarrao II	Shankarrao Chavan
21		Ramrao Adik (MLC for Elected by MLAs Constituency No. 05 - Ahmednagar District) (Legislative Council)	26 June 1988	03 March 1990	1 year, 250 days	Indian National Congress	Pawar II	Sharad Pawar
22		Shankarrao Genuji Kolhe (MLA for Kopargaon Constituency No. 219- Ahmednagar District) (Legislative Assembly)	03 March 1990	25 June 1991	1 year, 114 days	Indian National Congress	Pawar III	Sharad Pawar
23		Vilasrao Deshmukh (MLA for Latur City Constituency No. 235- Latur District) (Legislative Assembly)	25 June 1991	22 February 1993	1 year, 242 days	Indian National Congress	Sudhakarrao	Sudhakarrao Naik
24		Jawaharlal Darda (MLC for Elected by MLAs Constituency No. 19 - Yavatmal District) (Legislative Council)	06 March 1993	14 March 1995	2 years, 8 days	Indian National Congress	Pawar IV	Sharad Pawar
25		Nitin Gadkari (MLC for Nagpur Graduates Constituency No. 03 - Nagpur District) (Legislative Council)	14 March 1995	01 February 1999	3 years, 324 days	Bharatiya Janata Party	Joshi	Manohar Joshi
26		Mahadeorao Sukaji Shivankar (MLA for Amgaon Constituency No. 66- Gondia district) (Legislative Assembly)	01 February 1999	11 May 1999	99 days	Bharatiya Janata Party	Rane	Narayan Rane
27		Anna Dange (MLC for Elected by MLAs Constituency No. 05 - Sangli District) (Legislative Council)	11 May 1999	17 October 1999	159 days	Bharatiya Janata Party	Rane	Narayan Rane
28		Ganpatrao Deshmukh (MLA for Sangola Constituency No. 235- Solapur District (Legislative Assembly)	19 October 1999	16 January 2003	3 years, 89 days	Peasants and Workers Party of India	Deshmukh I	Vilasrao Deshmukh
29		Ranjeet Deshmukh (MLC for Elected by MLAs Constituency No. 16 - Nagpur District) (Legislative Council)	18 January 2003	01 November 2004	1 year, 295 days	Indian National Congress	Sushilkumar	Sushilkumar Shinde
30		Vilasrao Deshmukh (MLA for Latur City Constituency No. 235- Latur District) (Legislative Assembly) (Chief Minister)	01 November 2004	09 November 2004	8 days	Indian National Congress	Deshmukh II	Vilasrao Deshmukh
31		Harshvardhan Patil (MLA for Indapur Constituency No. 200- Pune District (Legislative Assembly)	09 November 2004	01 December 2008	4 years, 22 days	Independent Supported Party .(Indian National Congress)	Deshmukh II	Vilasrao Deshmukh
32		Madan Vishwanath Patil (MLA for Sangli Constituency No. 285- Sangli District) (Legislative Assembly)	08 December 2008	06 November 2009	333 days	Independent Supported Party .(Indian National Congress)	Ashok I	Ashok Chavan
33		Harshvardhan Patil (MLA for Indapur Constituency No. 200- Pune District (Legislative Assembly)	07 November 2009	10 November 2010	1 year, 3 days	Indian National Congress	Ashok II	Ashok Chavan
34		Mohammed Arif Naseem Khan (MLA for Kurla Constituency No. 174- Mumbai Suburban District) (Legislative Assembly)	11 November 2010	26 September 2014	3 years, 319 days	Indian National Congress	Prithviraj	Prithviraj Chavan
35		Chandrakant Patil (MLC for Pune Graduates Constituency No. 05 - Pune District) (Legislative Council)	31 October 2014	08 July 2016	1 year, 251 days	Bharatiya Janata Party	Fadnavis I	Devendra Fadnavis
36		Subhash Deshmukh (MLA for Solapur South Constituency No. 251- Solapur District (Legislative Assembly)	08 July 2016	16 June 2019	2 years, 343 days	Bharatiya Janata Party	Fadnavis I	Devendra Fadnavis
37		Ram Shinde (MLA for Karjat Jamkhed Constituency No. 127- Ahmednagar District) (Legislative Assembly)	16 June 2019	12 November 2019	149 days	Bharatiya Janata Party	Fadnavis I	Devendra Fadnavis
38		Devendra Fadnavis (MLA for Nagpur South West Constituency No. 52- Nagpur District) (Legislative Assembly) (Chief_Minister); In Charge	23 November 2019	28 November 2019	5 days	Bharatiya Janata Party	Fadnavis II	Devendra Fadnavis
39		Jayant Patil (MLA for Islampur Constituency No. 283- Sangli District) (Legislative Assembly)	28 November 2019	30 December 2019	32 days	Nationalist Congress Party	Thackeray	Uddhav Thackeray
40		Shamrao Pandurang Patil (MLA for Karad North Constituency No. 259- Satara District (Legislative Assembly)	30 December 2019	29 June 2022	2 years, 181 days	Nationalist Congress Party	Thackeray	Uddhav Thackeray
41		Eknath Shinde (MLA for Kopri-Pachpakhadi Constituency No. 147- Thane District) (Legislative Assembly) (Chief Minister); In Charge	30 June 2022	14 August 2022	45 days	Shiv Sena (2022–present)	Eknath	Eknath Shinde
42		Eknath Shinde (MLA for Kopri-Pachpakhadi Constituency No. 147- Thane District) (Legislative Assembly) (Chief Minister)	14 August 2022	14 July 2023	334 days	Shiv Sena (2022–present)	Eknath	Eknath Shinde
43		Abdul Sattar Abdul Nabi (MLA for Sillod Constituency No. 104- Chhatrapati Sambhaji Nagar District Also Previously Known Aurangabad District (Legislative Assembly)	14 July 2023	26 November 2024	1 year, 135 days	Shiv Sena (2022–present)	Eknath	Eknath Shinde
44		Devendra Fadnavis (MLA for Nagpur South West Constituency No. 52- Nagpur District) (Legislative Assembly) (Chief_Minister); In Charge	05 December 2024	21 December 2024	16 days	Bharatiya Janata Party	Fadnavis III	Devendra Fadnavis
45		Jayakumar Jitendrasinh Rawal (MLA for Sindkheda Constituency No. 06- Dhule District) (Legislative Assembly)	21 December 2024	Incumbent	1 year, 281 days	Bharatiya Janata Party	Fadnavis III	Devendra Fadnavis

== Ministers of State ==
No.	Portrait	Deputy Minister (Constituency)	Term of office			Political party	Ministry	Minister	Chief Minister
No.	Portrait	Deputy Minister (Constituency)	From	To	Period	Political party	Ministry	Minister	Chief Minister
Deputy Minister of Marketing
Vacant			23 November 2019	28 November 2019	5 days	NA	Fadnavis II	Devendra Fadnavis	Devendra Fadnavis
01		Shambhuraj Desai (MLA for Patan Constituency No. 261- Satara District) (Legislative Assembly)	30 December 2019	27 June 2022	2 years, 179 days	Shiv Sena	Thackeray	Shamrao Pandurang Patil	Uddhav Thackeray
02		Vishwajeet Kadam (MLA for Palus-Kadegaon Constituency No. 285- Sangli District) (Legislative Assembly); Additional_Charge	27 June 2022	29 June 2022	2 days	Indian National Congress	Thackeray	Shamrao Pandurang Patil	Uddhav Thackeray
Vacant			30 June 2022	26 November 2024	2 years, 149 days	NA	Eknath	Eknath Shinde (2022 - 2023); Abdul Sattar Abdul Nabi (2023 – 2024)	Eknath Shinde
Vacant			21 December 2024	incumbent	1 year, 281 days	NA	Fadnavis III	Jayakumar Jitendrasinh Rawal (2024 – Present)	Devendra Fadnavis
