= Ministry of Dairy Development (Maharashtra) =

Maharashtra government ministry responsible for Dairy Development

Ministry of Dairy Development Government of Maharashtra
- मंत्रालय दुग्ध व्यवसाय विकास विभाग, महाराष्ट्र शासन
- Seal of the state of Maharashtra

- Building of Administrative Headquarters of Mumbai

Ministry overview
- Jurisdiction: (India) Maharashtra
- Headquarters: Mantralay, Mumbai
- Minister responsible: Atul Save, Cabinet Minister
- Deputy Minister responsible: Vacant, TBD since 29 June 2022, Minister of State
- Ministry executive: (IAS)
- Parent department: Government of Maharashtra

The Ministry of Dairy Development is a Ministry of the Government of Maharashtra state.

The Ministry is headed by a cabinet level Minister. Atul Save is Current Minister of Dairy Development Government of Maharashtra.

== Head office ==
Minister of Dairy Development मंत्री दुग्ध व्यवसाय विकास विभाग
- Emblem of India

- Flag of India
- Incumbent; Atul Save since 21 December 2024
- Ministry of Dairy Development (Maharashtra)
- Style: The Honourable
- Abbreviation: Cabinet Minister
- Member of: State Cabinet
- Reports to: Chief Minister, Maharashtra Legislature
- Seat: Mantralaya, Mumbai
- Appointer: Governor on the advice of the Chief Minister
- Term length: 5 years
- Precursor: Devendra Fadnavis (2024 - 2024)
- Inaugural holder: Balasaheb Desai (1960-1962)
- Formation: 1 May 1960
- Deputy: Vacant, TBD; since 29 June 2022

== Cabinet Ministers ==
No.	Portrait	Minister (Constituency)	Term of office			Political party	Ministry	Chief Minister
No.	Portrait	Minister (Constituency)	From	To	Period	Political party	Ministry	Chief Minister
Minister of Dairy Development
01		Parashuram Krishnaji Sawant (MLA for Chiplun Constituency No. 265- Ratnagiri District) (Legislative Assembly)	01 May 1960	07 March 1962	1 year, 310 days	Indian National Congress	Yashwantrao I	Yashwantrao Chavan
02		Balasaheb Desai (MLA for Patan Constituency No. 261- Satara District) (Legislative Assembly)	08 March 1962	19 November 1962	256 days	Indian National Congress	Yashwantrao II	Yashwantrao Chavan
03		Balasaheb Desai (MLA for Patan Constituency No. 261- Satara District) (Legislative Assembly)	20 November 1962	24 November 1963	1 year, 4 days	Indian National Congress	Kannamwar l	Marotrao Kannamwar
04		Parashuram Krishnaji Sawant (MLA for Chiplun Constituency No. 265- Ratnagiri District) (Legislative Assembly) (Interim Chief Minister)	25 November 1962	04 December 1963	9 days	Indian National Congress	Sawant	Parashuram Krishnaji Sawant
05		Vasantrao Naik (MLA for Pusad Constituency No. 81- Yavatmal District) (Legislative Assembly) (Chief Minister)	05 December 1963	01 March 1967	3 years, 86 days	Indian National Congress	Vasantrao I	Vasantrao Naik
06		Gopalrao Bajirao Khedkar (MLA for Akot Constituency No. 28- Akola District) (Legislative Assembly)	01 March 1967	27 October 1969	2 years, 240 days	Indian National Congress	Vasantrao II	Vasantrao Naik
07		Narendra Mahipati Tidke (MLA for Savner Constituency No. 49- Nagpur District) (Legislative Assembly)	27 October 1969	13 March 1972	2 years, 138 days	Indian National Congress	Vasantrao II	Vasantrao Naik
08		Shankarrao Chavan (MLA for Bhokar Constituency No. 85- Nanded District) (Legislative Assembly)	13 March 1972	04 April 1973	1 year, 32 days	Indian National Congress	Vasantrao III	Vasantrao Naik
09		M. B. Popat (MLA for Dhobitalao Constituency No. 160- Mumbai City District) (Legislative Assembly)	04 April 1973	17 Match; 1974	347 days	Indian National Congress	Vasantrao III	Vasantrao Naik
10		Yashwantrao Mohite (MLA for Karad South Constituency No. 260- Satara District) (Legislative Assembly)	17 Match; 1974	21 February 1975	341 days	Indian National Congress	Vasantrao III	Vasantrao Naik
11		Shankarrao Bajirao Patil (MLA for Indapur Constituency No. 220- Pune District (Legislative Assembly)	21 February 1975	16 April 1977	2 years, 54 days	Indian National Congress	Shankarrao I	Shankarrao Chavan
12		Vasantdada Patil (MLA for Sangli Constituency No. 282- Sangli District) (Legislative Assembly) (Chief Minister)	17 April 1977	07 March 1978	1 year, 324 days	Indian National Congress	Vasantdada I	Vasantdada Patil
13		Sundarrao Solanke (MLA for Majalgaon Constituency No. 229- Beed District) (Legislative Assembly)	07 March 1978	18 July 1978	133 days	Indian National Congress (U)	Vasantdada II	Vasantdada Patil
14		Narayan Dnyandev Patil (MLA for Kolhapur Constituency No. 273- Kolhapur District (Legislative Assembly)	18 July 1978	25 May 1979	311 days	Peasants and Workers Party of India	Pawar I	Sharad Pawar
15		Sushilkumar Shinde (MLA for Solapur City Central Constituency No. 249- Solapur District) (Legislative Assembly)	25 May 1979	17 February 1980	268 days	Indian Congress (Socialist)	Pawar I	Sharad Pawar
16		Shivajirao Patil Nilangekar (MLA for Nilanga Constituency No. 238- Latur District) (Legislative Assembly)	09 June 1980	21 January 1982	1 year, 226 days	Indian National Congress	Antulay	Abdul Rahman Antulay
17		Baliram Waman Hiray (MLA for Dabhadi Constituency No. 74- Nashik District) (Legislative Assembly)	21 January 1982	02 February 1983	1 year, 12 days	Indian National Congress	Bhosale	Babasaheb Bhosale
18		Sudhakarrao Naik (MLA for Pusad Constituency No. 81- Yavatmal District) (Legislative Assembly)	07 February 1983	05 March 1985	2 years, 26 days	Indian National Congress	Vasantdada III	Vasantdada Patil
19		Vasantdada Patil (MLA for Sangli Constituency No. 282- Sangli District) (Legislative Assembly) (Chief Minister)	12 March 1985	03 June 1985	83 days	Indian National Congress	Vasantdada IV	Vasantdada Patil
20		Anantrao Thopte (MLA for Bhor Constituency No. 203- Pune District (Legislative Assembly)	03 June 1985	12 March 1986	282 days	Indian National Congress	Nilangekar	Shivajirao Patil Nilangekar
21		Bhagwantrao Gaikwad (MLA for Kalameshwar Constituency No. 52- Nagpur District (Legislative Assembly)	12 March 1986	26 June 1988	2 years, 106 days	Indian National Congress	Shankarrao II	Shankarrao Chavan
22		Datta Meghe (MLC for Elected by MLAs Constituency No. 15 - Wardha District) (Legislative Council)	26 June 1988	03 March 1990	1 year, 250 days	Indian National Congress	Pawar II	Sharad Pawar
23		Vilasrao Deshmukh (MLA for Latur City Constituency No. 235- Latur District) (Legislative Assembly)	03 March 1990	25 January 1991	328 days	Indian National Congress	Pawar III	Sharad Pawar
24		Anantrao Thopte (MLA for Bhor Constituency No. 203- Pune District (Legislative Assembly)	25 January 1991	25 June 1991	151 days	Indian National Congress	Pawar III	Sharad Pawar
25		Vilasrao Balkrishna Patil Undhalkar (MLA for Karad South Constituency No. 260- Satara District) (Legislative Assembly)	25 June 1991	30 December 1991	188 days	Indian National Congress	Sudhakarrao	Sudhakarrao Naik
26		Madhukarrao Pichad (MLA for Akole Constituency No. 213- Ahmednagar District (Legislative Assembly)	06 March 1993	18 November 1994	1 year, 257 days	Indian National Congress	Pawar IV	Sharad Pawar
27		Narayan Rane (MLA for Malvan Constituency No. 269- Sindhudurg District) (Legislative Assembly)	14 March 1995	01 February 1999	3 years, 324 days	Shiv Sena	Joshi	Manohar Joshi
28		Radhakrishna Vikhe Patil (MLA for Shirdi Constituency No. 218- Ahmednagar District) (Legislative Assembly)	01 February 1999	11 May 1999	99 days	Shiv Sena	Rane	Narayan Rane
29		Narayan Rane (MLA for Malvan Constituency No. 269- Sindhudurg District) (Legislative Assembly) (Chief Minister)	11 May 1999	17 October 1999	159 days	Shiv Sena	Rane	Narayan Rane
30		Vilasrao Deshmukh (MLA for Latur City Constituency No. 235- Latur District) (Legislative Assembly) (Chief Minister)	19 October 1999	27 October 1999	8 days	Indian National Congress	Deshmukh I	Vilasrao Deshmukh
31		Anand Devkate (MLA for Solapur South Constituency No. 251- Solapur District (Legislative Assembly)	27 October 1999	16 January 2003	3 years, 81 days	Indian National Congress	Deshmukh I	Vilasrao Deshmukh
32		Anand Devkate (MLA for Solapur South Constituency No. 251- Solapur District (Legislative Assembly)	18 January 2003	03 March 2004	1 year, 52 days	Indian National Congress	Sushilkumar	Sushilkumar Shinde
33		Padamsinh Bajirao Patil (MLA for Osmanabad Constituency No. 242- Osmanabad District (Legislative Assembly)	03 March 2004	01 November 2004	243 days	Nationalist Congress Party	Sushilkumar	Sushilkumar Shinde
34		Vilasrao Deshmukh (MLA for Latur City Constituency No. 235- Latur District) (Legislative Assembly) (Chief Minister)	01 November 2004	09 November 2004	8 days	Indian National Congress	Deshmukh II	Vilasrao Deshmukh
35		Anees Ahmed (MLA for Nagpur Central Constituency No. 55- Nagpur District (Legislative Assembly)	09 November 2004	01 December 2008	4 years, 22 days	Indian National Congress	Deshmukh II	Vilasrao Deshmukh
36		Ravisheth Patil (MLA for Pen Constituency No. 191- Raigad District) (Legislative Assembly)	08 December 2008	06 November 2009	333 days	Indian National Congress	Ashok I	Ashok Chavan
37		Nitin Raut (MLA for Nagpur North Constituency No. 57- Nagpur District) (Legislative Assembly)	07 November 2009	10 November 2010	1 year, 3 days	Indian National Congress	Ashok II	Ashok Chavan
38		Madhukarrao Chavan (MLA for Tuljapur Constituency No. 241 - Dharashiv District Also Previously Known Osmanabad District (Legislative Assembly)	11 November 2010	07 June 2014	3 years, 238 days	Indian National Congress	Prithviraj	Prithviraj Chavan
39		Abdul Sattar Abdul Nabi (MLA for Sillod Constituency No. 104- Chhatrapati Sambhaji Nagar District Also Previously Known Aurangabad District (Legislative Assembly)	07 June 2014	26 September 2014	81 days	Indian National Congress	Prithviraj	Prithviraj Chavan
40		Eknath Khadse (MLA for Muktainagar Constituency No. 20- Jalgaon District) (Legislative Assembly)	31 October 2014	04 June 2016	1 year, 217 days	Bharatiya Janata Party	Fadnavis I	Devendra Fadnavis
41		Pankaja Munde (MLA for Parli Constituency No. 233- Beed District) (Legislative Assembly)	04 June 2016	08 July 2016	34 days	Bharatiya Janata Party	Fadnavis I	Devendra Fadnavis
42		Mahadev Jankar (MLC for Elected by MLAs Constituency No. 30 - Parbhani District) (Legislative Council)	08 July 2016	12 November 2019	3 years, 127 days	Rashtriya Samaj Paksha	Fadnavis I	Devendra Fadnavis
43		Devendra Fadnavis (MLA for Nagpur South West Constituency No. 52- Nagpur District) (Legislative Assembly) (Chief_Minister); In Charge	23 November 2019	28 November 2019	5 days	Bharatiya Janata Party	Fadnavis II	Devendra Fadnavis
44		Balasaheb Thorat (MLA for Sangamner Constituency No. 217- Ahmednagar District) (Legislative Assembly)	28 November 2019	30 December 2019	32 days	Indian National Congress	Thackeray	Uddhav Thackeray
45		Sunil Chhatrapal Kedar (MLA for Savner Constituency No. 49- Nagpur District) (Legislative Assembly)	30 December 2019	29 June 2022	2 years, 181 days	Indian National Congress	Thackeray	Uddhav Thackeray
46		Eknath Shinde (MLA for Kopri-Pachpakhadi Constituency No. 147- Thane District) (Legislative Assembly) (Chief Minister); In Charge	30 June 2022	14 August 2022	45 days	Shiv Sena (2022–present)	Eknath	Eknath Shinde
47		Radhakrishna Vikhe Patil (MLA for Shirdi Constituency No. 218- Ahmednagar District) (Legislative Assembly)	14 August 2022	26 November 2024	2 years, 135 days	Bharatiya Janata Party	Eknath	Eknath Shinde
48		Devendra Fadnavis (MLA for Nagpur South West Constituency No. 52- Nagpur District) (Legislative Assembly) (Chief_Minister); In Charge	05 December 2024	21 December 2024	16 days	Bharatiya Janata Party	Fadnavis III	Devendra Fadnavis
49		Atul Save (MLA for Aurangabad East Constituency No. 109- Chhatrapati Sambhaji Nagar District Also Previously Known Aurangabad District (Legislative Assembly)	21 December 2024	Incumbent	1 year, 281 days	Bharatiya Janata Party	Fadnavis III	Devendra Fadnavis

== Ministers of State ==
No.	Portrait	Deputy Minister (Constituency)	Term of office			Political party	Ministry	Minister	Chief Minister
No.	Portrait	Deputy Minister (Constituency)	From	To	Period	Political party	Ministry	Minister	Chief Minister
Deputy Minister of Dairy Development
Vacant			23 November 2019	28 November 2019	5 days	NA	Fadnavis II	Devendra Fadnavis	Devendra Fadnavis
01		Dattatray Vithoba Bharne (MLA for Indapur Constituency No. 200- Pune District (Legislative Assembly)	30 December 2019	29 June 2022	2 years, 181 days	Nationalist Congress Party	Thackeray	Sunil Chhatrapal Kedar	Uddhav Thackeray
Vacant			30 June 2022	26 November 2024	2 years, 149 days	NA	Eknath	Eknath Shinde (2022 - 2022); Radhakrishna Vikhe Patil (2022 – 2024)	Eknath Shinde
Vacant			21 December 2024	incumbent	1 year, 281 days	NA	Fadnavis III	Atul Save (2024 – Present)	Devendra Fadnavis
