= Patan (Satara) Assembly constituency =

Constituency of the Maharashtra legislative assembly in India

Patan (Satara)
- Former constituency for the Maharashtra Legislative Assembly

Constituency details
- Country: India
- Region: Western India
- State: Maharashtra
- District: North Satara District
- Established: 1955
- Abolished: 1961
- Total electors: 55,298
- Reservation: None

Patan (Satara) Assembly constituency was an assembly constituency in the India state of Maharashtra. After the 1961 Delimitation act, its area was merged into Patan and Satara constituencies.

== Members of the Legislative Assembly ==
Election	Member	Party
1957	Daulatrao Shripatrao Desai	Indian National Congress

== Election results ==
=== Assembly election 1957 ===
1957 Bombay State Legislative Assembly election : Patan (Satara)
Party	Candidate	Votes	%	±%
INC	Daulatrao Shripatrao Desai	19,568	58.84%	New
PWPI	Patankar Balasaheb Ganpatrao	13,686	41.16%	New
Margin of victory		5,882	17.69%	
Turnout		33,254	60.14%	
Total valid votes		33,254		
Registered electors		55,298		
INC win (new seat)				
