= Sadanand Varde =

Indian politician

Member of Maharashtra Legislative Assembly
- In office 1978–1980

Education Minister of Maharashtra
- In office 18 July 1978 – 18 February 1980

Minister of State Excise and Forest Ministry
- In office 18 July 1978 – 18 February 1980

Personal details
- Born: 6 November 1925 Maharashtra
- Died: 29 January 2007 (aged 81) Bandra, Mumbai, Maharashtra
- Party: Janata Party; Samajwadi Party
- Spouse: Sudha Varde
- Children: Abhijit (son), Jhelum Paranjape (daughter)
- Occupation: Professor, Politician

Sadanand Varde (6 November 1925 – 29 January 2007) was an Indian socialist leader, politician, and freedom fighter from Maharashtra. He served as the Education Minister of Maharashtra State in the government led by Sharad Pawar's Progressive Democratic Front in 1978. Varde was elected as a Member of the Legislative Assembly (MLA) from the Bandra constituency as a member of the Samajwadi Party during the same year.

== Career ==
Varde started his career as a professor of economics at R. D. National College in Bandra. Actively involved in the Quit India movement as a college student, he faced imprisonment for 18 months during the 1942 Quit India movement. He spent 18 months in jail during the Emergency, imposed by Indira Gandhi.

Sadanand Varde served as a corporator in the Brihanmumbai Municipal Corporation (BMC) for over a decade. In 1978, he was elected as the MLA from the Bandra assembly constituency representing the Samajwadi Party. Varde assumed the role of the Education Minister of Maharashtra in the Sharad Pawar-led Progressive Democratic Front government in 1978. He was also given the portfolio of the State Excise and Forest Ministry. He served as the Member of the Maharashtra Legislative Council.

He was associated with the Sadhana weekly, a Socialist Marathi publication and established the 'Apna Ghar (Aple Ghar)' housing complex for survivors and orphans of the 1993 Latur earthquake in Marathwada region. Later, Varde dedicated himself as a full-time volunteer for the Rashtra Seva Dal.

== Personal life ==
Sadanand Varde was married to Sudha Varde. The couple had a son named Abhijit and a daughter, Jhelum Paranjape, an Odissi dance exponent. He died on 29 January 2007, at his home in Bandra, Mumbai, after a prolonged illness.
