= Shambhuraj Desai =

Indian politician (born 1966)

Cabinet Minister Government of Maharashtra
- Incumbent
- Assumed office 15 December 2024
- Minister: Tourism; Mining; Ex. Servicemen Welfare
- Governor: C. P. Radhakrishnan; Acharya Devvrat additional charge
- Cabinet: Third Fadnavis ministry
- Chief Minister: Devendra Fadnavis
- Deputy CM: Eknath Shinde; Ajit Pawar (till his demise in 2026) Sunetra Pawar (from 2026)
- Guardian Minister: Satara district

Cabinet Minister Government of Maharashtra
- In office 14 August 2022 – 26 November 2024
- Minister: State Excise; State Border Defence (Second) On 16 October 2022
- Governor: Bhagat Singh Koshyari; Ramesh Bais; C. P. Radhakrishnan
- Chief Minister: Eknath Shinde
- Deputy CM: Devendra Fadnavis; Ajit Pawar
- Guardian Minister: Thane District; Satara District
- Preceded by: Ajit Pawar Additional Charge (State Excise Ministry); Eknath Shinde Additional Charge (State Border Defence Ministry); Subhash Desai Additional Charge (Thane District); Shamrao Pandurang Patil (Satara District)

Minister of State Government of Maharashtra
- In office 30 December 2019 – 27 June 2022
- Minister: Home Affairs (Rural).; Finance; Planning.; State Excise.; Skill Development And Entrepreneurship.; Marketing
- Governor: Bhagat Singh Koshyari
- Chief Minister: Uddhav Thackeray
- Deputy CM: Ajit Pawar
- Guardian Minister: Washim District

Member of the Maharashtra Legislative Assembly
- Incumbent
- Assumed office 2014
- Preceded by: Vikramsinh Patankar
- Constituency: Patan
- In office 2004–2009
- Preceded by: Vikramsinh Patankar
- Succeeded by: Vikramsinh Patankar
- Constituency: Patan

Chairman of Maharashtra Cooperation Council (Minister of State status)
- In office 1997–1999

Personal details
- Born: 17 November 1966 (age 60) Marali, Patan taluka, Satara District
- Party: Shiv Sena
- Relatives: Balasaheb Desai (Grandfather)
- Occupation: Politician
- Website: shambhurajdesai.com

Shambhuraj Shivajirao Desai (born 17 November 1966) is an Indian politician and Shiv Sena leader (Eknath Shinde Faction) from Satara district, Maharashtra. He is a member of the 14th Maharashtra Legislative Assembly. He represents the Patan Assembly Constituency. He had been elected to Vidhan Sabha for four terms in 2004, 2014, 2019 and 2024.

== Positions held ==
- 1986-96: Chairman of Loknete Balasaheb Desai Sahakari Sakhar Karkhana Ltd.
- 1992-2002: Member of Zilla Parishad Satara
- 1997-99: Chairman of Maharashtra Cooperation Council (Minister of State status)
- 2004: Elected to Maharashtra Legislative Assembly
- 2014: Re-elected to Maharashtra Legislative Assembly
- 2019: Re-elected to Maharashtra Legislative Assembly
- 2019: Appointed minister of state for Home (Rural), Finance and Planning, State Excise, Marketing, Skill Development and Entrepreneurship
- 2020: Appointed guardian minister of Washim district
- 2023: Appointed guardian minister of Satara district & Thane District Additional charge (Second) on Government of Maharashtra .
- 2023: Appointed the Minister of state Excise & state Border Defence (second) in October 2022.
- * 2024: Re-elected to Maharashtra Legislative Assembly

== See also ==
- Uddhav Thackeray ministry
