= First Vasantrao Naik ministry =

- Ministry of Maharashtra
- Date formed: 5 December 1963
- Date dissolved: 1 March 1967

People and organisations
- Governor: Vijaya Lakshmi Pandit (1963-64); P. V. Cherian (1964-67)
- Chief Minister: Vasantrao Naik
- Total no. of members: 24; 14 Cabinet ministers (Incl. Chief Minister); 10 deputy ministers
- Member parties: Congress
- Status in legislature: Majority government
- Opposition party: PWPI; BJS
- Opposition leader: Legislative Assembly: Krishnarao Dhulap (PWPI); Legislative Council: V. B. Gogate (BJS) (1963-66); Ramjeevan Choudhary (BJS) (1966-67)

History
- Election: 1962
- Outgoing election: 1967
- Predecessor: Kannamwar; Sawant (interim)
- Successor: V. Naik II

Vasantrao Naik became the chief minister of Maharashtra on 5 December 1963. He succeeded P. K. Sawant's interim government that had been sworn in after Marotrao Kannamwar's death. Naik's government served until 1967 legislative elections, after which Naik was sworn in for a second term.

== List of ministers ==
The ministry consisted of 14 cabinet ministers.

Cabinet members
Portfolio	Minister	Took office	Left office	Party
Chief Minister: General Administration, Protocol; Revenue, Planning, Information and Public Relations; Forests; Relief & Rehabilitation; Dairy Development; Ex. Servicemen Welfare; Departments or portfolios not allocated to any minister	Vasantrao Naik	5 November 1963	1 March 1967	INC
Cabinet Minister: Home Affairs, Information Technology; Minority Development and Waqfs; Command Area Development; Sanitation	Balasaheb Desai	5 November 1963	1 March 1967	INC
Cabinet Minister: Rural Development; Horticulture; Transport; Food and Drug Administration	G. B. Khedkar	5 November 1963	1 March 1967	INC
Cabinet Minister: Agriculture, Parliamentary Affairs; Medical Education; Other Backward Classes	P. K. Sawant	5 November 1963	1 March 1967	INC
Cabinet Minister: Public Health, Law and Judiciary; Skill Development, Employment and Entrepreneurship	Shantilal Shah	5 November 1963	1 March 1967	INC
Cabinet Minister: Finance; Public Works; Sports and Youth Welfare; Culture Affairs	S. K. Wankhede	5 November 1963	1 March 1967	INC
Cabinet Minister: Irrigation; Power; Urban Development; Soil and Water Conservation; Marketing	Shankarrao Chavan	5 November 1963	1 March 1967	INC
Cabinet Minister: Industries; Mining Department; Environment and Climate Change; Disaster Management; Marathi Language	Sadashiv Govind Barve	5 November 1963	1 March 1967	INC
Cabinet Minister: Food, Civil Supplies; Housing; Printing Presses; Fisheries; Small Savings; Tourism	Homi J. H. Taleyarkhan	5 November 1963	1 March 1967	INC
Cabinet Minister: Prohibition; State Excise; Ports Development; Textiles; Majority Welfare	D. S. Palaspagar	5 November 1963	1 March 1967	INC
Cabinet Minister: Social Welfare; Woman and Child Development; Special Backward Classes Welfare; Employment Guarantee	Nirmala Raje Bhosale	5 November 1963	1 March 1967	INC
Cabinet Minister: Buildings; Communications; School Education; Higher and Technical Education	Madhukar Dhanaji Chaudhari	5 November 1963	1 March 1967	INC
Cabinet Minister: Cooperation; Nomadic Tribesl Department; Vimukta Jati; Water Supply; Khar Land Development	Keshavrao Sonawane	5 November 1963	1 March 1967	INC
Cabinet Minister: Labour; Special Assistance; Socially and Educationally Backward Classes; Animal Husbandry Department; Tribal Development; Earthquake Rehabilitation	Narendra Mahipati Tidke	5 November 1963	1 March 1967	INC

=== Deputy ministers ===
The ministry also contained 10 deputy ministers:

- G. D. Patil
- N. N. Kailas
- Y. J. Mohite
- M. A. Vairale
- R. A. Patil
- H. G. Vartak
- B. J. Khatal
- Rafiq Zakaria
- K. P. Patil
- D. S. Jagtap
