= Vikramsinh Patankar =

Indian politician (born 1943)

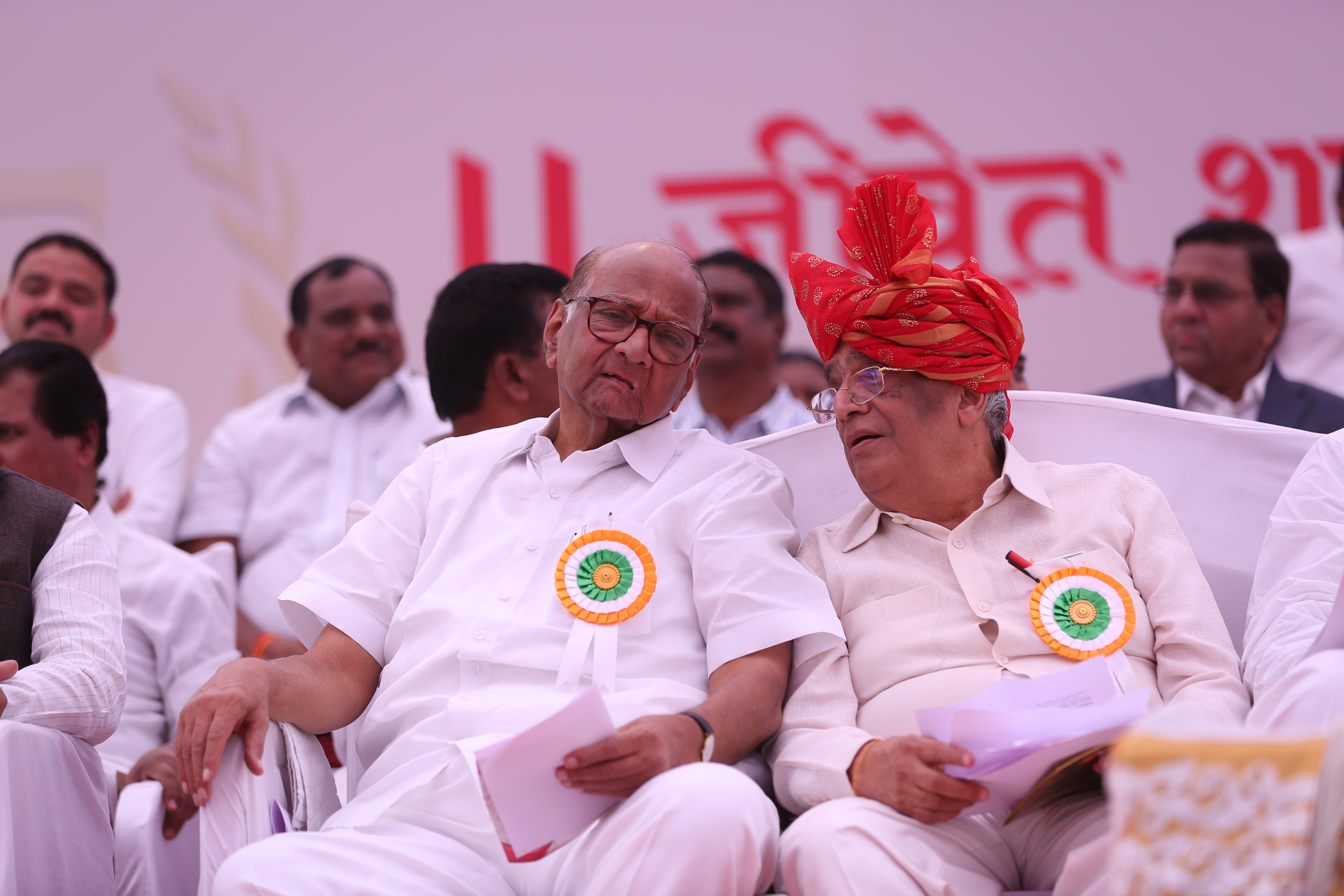
- Sharad Pawar (right) and Vikramsinh Patankar (left)

Minister of Public works, Maharashtra
- In office 1999–2004
- Chief Minister: Vilasrao Deshmukh

Minister of Tourism, Maharashtra
- In office July 2004 – November 2004
- Chief Minister: Sushilkumar Shinde

Member of Legislative Assembly
- In office 1983–2004
- Preceded by: Daulatrao Shripatrao Desai
- Succeeded by: Shambhuraj Desai
- Constituency: Patan
- In office 2009–2014
- Preceded by: Shambhuraj Desai
- Succeeded by: Shambhuraj Desai
- Constituency: Patan

Personal details
- Born: 27 December 1943 (age 82)
- Party: Nationalist Congress Party (1999−present)
- Other political affiliations: Indian National Congress (U) (1980-1985); Indian National Congress (S) (1985-1990); Indian National Congress (1990−1999)
- Children: 2 (including Satyajit Patankar)
- Parent: Ranjitsinh Patankar (father)
- Education: B.com
- Alma mater: University of Baroda

Vikramsinh Ranjitsinh Patankar (born 27 December 1943) is an Indian politician from Maharashtra, who was a Member of Legislative Assembly (MLA), representing the Patan (Maharashtra Vidhan Sabha constituency) for five terms since 1983 to 2014, winning 1983, 1985, 1990, 1995, 1999 and 2009 elections. He is a senior leader of the Nationalist Congress Party.

He served as the Minister of Public works in the cabinet of Vilasrao Deshmukh from 1999 to 2004. In July 2004, he was given additional charge of Tourism Ministry in the Sushilkumar Shinde's cabinet.

== Background and family ==
Vikramsinh Patankar hails from Patan royal family, that participated in the establishment of Hindavi Swarajya. He received a bachelor's degree in commerce from the University of Baroda in 1962.

== Career ==
He was first elected as an MLA, by winning a by-election in 1983 from Patan, and subsequently re-elected from the same constituency in 1985 assembly election on the ticket of Indian Congress (Socialist). In 1990, he won the seat, securing 62647 votes for Indian National Congress. He was re-elected in the 1995 assembly election by defeating nearest rival Shambhuraj Desai. In 1999, he successfully contested the election from the Sharad Pawar's newly formed party, Nationalist Congress Party.

In 1999, he was assigned the ministry of Public works in the chief minister Vilasrao Deshmukh's cabinet. In 2002, he was a Guardian Minister for Beed district of Maharashtra. He held additional charge of Maharashtra's Tourism Ministry in Sushilkumar Shinde's cabinet from July 2004 to November 2004.

He played a major role in the upcoming New Mahabaleshwar project in Satara district. During his tenure as PWD Minister, he worked on the completion of Mumbai Pune Expressway and Bandra–Worli Sea Link. He helped set up one of the largest wind farms in Asia in Patan taluka of Maharashtra. Patankar also held the position of chairman of the Maharashtra State Road Development Corporation.

He lost the assembly election in 2004 by a small margin. In 2009, Vikramsinh Patankar won the assembly election from Patan constituency by defeating the Shiv Sena's candidate by a margin of 580 votes. Before being elected as an MLA, Vikramsinh Patankar was elected as a member of Zila Parishad (district council) from Satara district in 1972.

== Positions held ==
#	From	To	Position	Refs.
01	1972	1979	Member of Zila Parishad, Satara district	
02	1983	1985	Member of Legislative Assembly for Patan	
03	1985	1990	Member of Legislative Assembly for Patan	
04	1990	1995	Member of Legislative Assembly for Patan	
05	1995	1999	Member of Legislative Assembly for Patan	
06	1999	2004	Member of Legislative Assembly for Patan	
07	1999	2004	Minister of Tourism & PWD, Government of Maharashtra	
08	2009	2014	Member of Legislative Assembly for Patan	
