= Second Vasantrao Naik ministry =

Following 1967 Maharashtra legislative elections, incumbent chief minister Vasantrao Naik was re-elected for a second term. His second government remained in place until 1972 elections, being succeeded by his third government.

== List of ministers ==
Portfolio	Minister	Took office	Left office	Party
Chief Minister; Departments or portfolios not allocated to any minister	Vasantrao Naik	1 March 1967	13 March 1972	INC
Parliamentary Affairs	Shankarrao Chavan	27 October 1969	3 March 1972	INC

== Ministry ==
Portfolio	Minister	Took office	Left office	Party
Chief Minister: General Administration; Information and Public Relations; Information Technology; Law and Judiciary	Vasantrao Naik	1 March 19678	13 March 1972	INC
Cabinet Minister: Revenue	P. K. Sawant	1 March 1967	13 March 1972	INC
Cabinet Minister: Buildings; Communications	Madhukar Dhanaji Chaudhari	1 March 1967	13 March 1972	INC
Cabinet Minister: Social Welfare	Pratibha Patil	1 March 1967	13 March 1972	INC
Cabinet Minister: Prohibition; State Excise	Shantilal Shah	1 March 1967	13 March 1972	INC
Cabinet Minister: Home; Ex. Servicemen Welfare	Vasantrao Naik	1 March 1967	27 October 1969	INC
Cabinet Minister: Home; Ex. Servicemen Welfare	Shankarrao Chavan	27 October 1969	13 March 1972	INC
Cabinet Minister: Planning	Vasantrao Naik	1 March 1967	27 October 1969	INC
Cabinet Minister: Planning	Pratibha Patil	27 October 1969	13 March 1972	INC
Cabinet Minister: Finance	Shankarrao Chavan	1 March 1967	27 October 1969	INC
Cabinet Minister: Finance	Pratibha Patil	27 October 1969	13 March 1972	INC
Cabinet Minister: Minority Development and Waqfs	Shankarrao Chavan	1 March 1967	27 October 1969	INC
Cabinet Minister: Minority Development and Waqfs	Pratibha Patil	27 October 1969	13 March 1972	INC
Cabinet Minister: Parliamentary Affairs	Shankarrao Chavan	1 March 1967	27 October 1969	INC
Cabinet Minister: Parliamentary Affairs	S. K. Wankhede	27 October 1969	13 March 1972	INC
Cabinet Minister: Public Works; Majority Welfare	Balasaheb Desai	1 March 1967	27 October 1969	INC
Cabinet Minister: Public Works; Majority Welfare	S. K. Wankhede	27 October 1969	13 March 1972	INC
Cabinet Minister: Urban Development	Narendra Mahipati Tidke	1 March 1967	27 October 1969	INC
Cabinet Minister: Urban Development	Balasaheb Desai	27 October 1969	13 March 1972	INC
Cabinet Minister: Housing; Printing Presses	D. S. Palaspagar	1 March 1967	27 October 1969	INC
Cabinet Minister: Housing; Printing Presses	G. B. Khedkar	27 October 1969	13 March 1972	INC
Cabinet Minister: Small Savings; Sports and Youth Welfare	Vasantrao Naik	1 March 1967	27 October 1969	INC
Cabinet Minister: Small Savings; Sports and Youth Welfare	Homi J. H. Taleyarkhan	27 October 1969	13 March 1972	INC
Cabinet Minister: Environment and Climate Change; Co-operation	Keshavrao Sonawane	1 March 1967	27 October 1969	INC
Cabinet Minister: Environment and Climate Change; Co-operation	G. B. Khedkar	27 October 1969	13 March 1972	INC
Cabinet Minister: School Education	Homi J. H. Taleyarkhan	1 March 1967	27 October 1969	INC
Cabinet Minister: School Education	Nirmala Raje Bhosale	27 October 1969	13 March 1972	INC
Cabinet Minister: Higher and Technical Education	D. S. Palaspagar	1 March 1967	27 October 1969	INC
Cabinet Minister: Higher and Technical Education	S. K. Wankhede	27 October 1969	13 March 1972	INC
Cabinet Minister: Medical Education	Shankarrao Chavan	1 March 1967	27 October 1969	INC
Cabinet Minister: Medical Education	Madhukar Dhanaji Chaudhari	27 October 1969	13 March 1972	INC
Cabinet Minister: Ports Development	Balasaheb Desai	1 March 1967	27 October 1969	INC
Cabinet Minister: Ports Development	S. K. Wankhede	27 October 1969	13 March 1972	INC
Cabinet Minister: Agriculture	G. B. Khedkar	1 March 1967	27 October 1969	INC
Cabinet Minister: Agriculture	Keshavrao Sonawane	27 October 1969	13 March 1972	INC
Cabinet Minister: Woman and Child Development	Sadashiv Govind Barve	1 March 1967	27 October 1969	INC
Cabinet Minister: Woman and Child Development	Nirmala Raje Bhosale	27 October 1969	13 March 1972	INC
Cabinet Minister: Transport; Earthquake Rehabilitation	Madhukar Dhanaji Chaudhari	1 March 1967	27 October 1969	INC
Cabinet Minister: Transport; Earthquake Rehabilitation	Shankarrao Chavan	27 October 1969	13 March 1972	INC
Cabinet Minister: Special Assistance	Pratibha Patil	1 March 1967	9 September 1969	INC
Cabinet Minister: Special Assistance	D. S. Palaspagar	9 September 1969	13 March 1972	INC
Cabinet Minister: Food, Civil Supplies & Consumer Protection	Keshavrao Sonawane	1 March 1967	27 October 1969	INC
Cabinet Minister: Food, Civil Supplies & Consumer Protection	Shankarrao Chavan	27 October 1969	13 March 1972	INC
Cabinet Minister: Food and Drug Administration	Vasantrao Naik CM	1 March 1967	27 October 1969	INC
Cabinet Minister: Food and Drug Administration	P. K. Sawant	27 October 1969	13 March 1972	INC
Cabinet Minister: Relief & Rehabilitation; Khar Land Development	S. K. Wankhede	1 March 1967	27 October 1969	INC
Cabinet Minister: Relief & Rehabilitation; Khar Land Development	P. K. Sawant	27 October 1969	13 March 1972	INC
Cabinet Minister: Disaster Management	Vasantrao Naik CM	1 March 1967	27 October 1969	INC
Cabinet Minister: Disaster Management	Balasaheb Desai	27 October 1969	13 March 1972	INC
Cabinet Minister: Mining Department	Shantilal Shah	1 March 1967	27 October 1969	INC
Cabinet Minister: Mining Department	Pratibha Patil	27 October 1969	13 March 1972	INC
Cabinet Minister: Socially and Educationally Backward Classes	Pratibha Patil	1 March 1967	27 October 1969	INC
Cabinet Minister: Socially and Educationally Backward Classes	D. S. Palaspagar	27 October 1969	13 March 1972	INC
Cabinet Minister: Special Backward Classes Welfare	G. B. Khedkar	1 March 1967	27 October 1969	INC
Cabinet Minister: Special Backward Classes Welfare	Nirmala Raje Bhosale	27 October 1969	13 March 1972	INC
Cabinet Minister: Nomadic Tribesl Department	Vasantrao Naik CM	1 March 1967	27 October 1969	INC
Cabinet Minister: Nomadic Tribesl Department	P. K. Sawant	27 October 1969	13 March 1972	INC
Cabinet Minister: Vimukta Jati	Pratibha Patil	1 March 1967	27 October 1969	INC
Cabinet Minister: Vimukta Jati	Vasantrao Naik CM	27 October 1969	13 March 1972	INC
Cabinet Minister: Soil and Water Conservation	Madhukar Dhanaji Chaudhari	1 March 1967	27 October 1969	INC
Cabinet Minister: Soil and Water Conservation	Balasaheb Desai	27 October 1969	13 March 1972	INC
Cabinet Minister: Marketing	P. K. Sawant	1 March 1967	27 October 1969	INC
Cabinet Minister: Marketing	Pratibha Patil	27 October 1969	13 March 1972	INC
Cabinet Minister: Tourism	Balasaheb Desai	1 March 1967	27 October 1969	INC
Cabinet Minister: Tourism	P. K. Sawant	27 October 1969	13 March 1972	INC
Cabinet Minister: Skill Development, Employment and Entrepreneurship	Vasantrao Naik CM	1 March 1967	27 October 1969	INC
Cabinet Minister: Skill Development, Employment and Entrepreneurship	Pratibha Patil	27 October 1969	13 March 1972	INC
Cabinet Minister: Animal Husbandry Department; Dairy Development	G. B. Khedkar	1 March 1967	27 October 1969	INC
Cabinet Minister: Animal Husbandry Department; Dairy Development	Narendra Mahipati Tidke	27 October 1969	13 March 1972	INC
Cabinet Minister: Fisheries Department	P. K. Sawant	1 March 1967	27 October 1969	INC
Cabinet Minister: Fisheries Department	Nirmala Raje Bhosale	27 October 1969	13 March 1972	INC
Cabinet Minister: Cultural Affairs	Vasantrao Naik CM	1 March 1967	27 October 1969	INC
Cabinet Minister: Cultural Affairs	Pratibha Patil	27 October 1969	13 March 1972	INC
Cabinet Minister: Forests Department	P. K. Sawant	1 March 1967	27 October 1969	INC
Cabinet Minister: Forests Department	Vasantrao Naik CM	27 October 1969	13 March 1972	INC
Cabinet Minister: Textiles	Shankarrao Chavan	1 March 1967	27 October 1969	INC
Cabinet Minister: Textiles	Madhukar Dhanaji Chaudhari	27 October 1969	13 March 1972	INC
Cabinet Minister: Tribal Development	Nirmala Raje Bhosale	1 March 1967	27 October 1969	INC
Cabinet Minister: Tribal Development	Sadashiv Govind Barve	27 October 1969	13 March 1972	INC
Cabinet Minister: Rural Development	S. K. Wankhede	1 March 1967	27 October 1969	INC
Cabinet Minister: Rural Development	Balasaheb Desai	27 October 1969	13 March 1972	INC
Cabinet Minister: Labour	Madhukar Dhanaji Chaudhari	1 March 1967	27 October 1969	INC
Cabinet Minister: Labour	Pratibha Patil	27 October 1969	13 March 1972	INC
Cabinet Minister: Other Backward Classes - OBC	Shantilal Shah	1 March 1967	27 October 1969	INC
Cabinet Minister: Other Backward Classes - OBC	Balasaheb Desai	27 October 1969	13 March 1972	INC
Cabinet Minister: Protocol	G. B. Khedkar	1 March 1967	27 October 1969	INC
Cabinet Minister: Protocol	D. S. Palaspagar	27 October 1969	13 March 1972	INC
Cabinet Minister: Power	Madhukar Dhanaji Chaudhari	1 March 1967	27 October 1969	INC
Cabinet Minister: Power	S. K. Wankhede	27 October 1969	13 March 1972	INC
Cabinet Minister: Irrigation	Balasaheb Desai	1 March 1967	27 October 1969	INC
Cabinet Minister: Irrigation	P. K. Sawant	27 October 1969	13 March 1972	INC
Cabinet Minister: Power	Madhukar Dhanaji Chaudhari	1 March 1967	27 October 1969	INC
Cabinet Minister: Power	S. K. Wankhede	27 October 1969	13 March 1972	INC
Cabinet Minister: Command Area Development	Shankarrao Chavan	1 March 1967	27 October 1969	INC
Cabinet Minister: Command Area Development	Narendra Mahipati Tidke	27 October 1969	13 March 1972	INC
Cabinet Minister: Horticulture	Vasantrao Naik CM	1 March 1967	27 October 1969	INC
Cabinet Minister: Horticulture	Shantilal Shah	27 October 1969	13 March 1972	INC
Cabinet Minister: Employment Guarantee	Shankarrao Chavan	1 March 1967	27 October 1969	INC
Cabinet Minister: Employment Guarantee	Madhukar Dhanaji Chaudhari	27 October 1969	13 March 1972	INC
Cabinet Minister: Water Supply	Vasantrao Naik CM	1 March 1967	27 October 1969	INC
Cabinet Minister: Water Supply	P. K. Sawant	27 October 1969	13 March 1972	INC
Cabinet Minister: Sanitation	Nirmala Raje Bhosale	1 March 1967	27 October 1969	INC
Cabinet Minister: Sanitation	Narendra Mahipati Tidke	27 October 1969	13 March 1972	INC
Cabinet Minister: Marathi Language	Balasaheb Desai	1 March 1967	27 October 1969	INC
Cabinet Minister: Marathi Language	Pratibha Patil	27 October 1969	13 March 1972	INC
Cabinet Minister: Industries	Shankarrao Chavan	1 March 1967	27 October 1969	INC
Cabinet Minister: Industries	S. K. Wankhede	27 October 1969	13 March 1972	INC
Cabinet Minister: Public Health	G. B. Khedkar	1 March 1967	27 October 1969	INC
Cabinet Minister: Public Health	Pratibha Patil	27 October 1969	13 March 1972	INC
