= Kannamwar ministry =

Government of Maharashtra, 1962–1963

- Ministry of Maharashtra
- Date formed: 20 November 1962
- Date dissolved: 24 November 1963

People and organisations
- Governor: Vijaya Lakshmi Pandit
- Chief Minister: Marotrao Kannamwar
- Total no. of members: 31; 16 Cabinet ministers (incl. Chief Minister); 15 deputy ministers
- Member parties: Congress
- Status in legislature: Majority government
- Opposition party: PWPI; BJS
- Opposition leader: Legislative Assembly: Krishnarao Dhulap (PWPI); Legislative Council: V. B. Gogate (BJS)

History
- Election: 1962
- Predecessor: Y. Chavan II
- Successor: P. K. Sawant ministry (interim)

Marotrao Kannamwar became the chief minister of Maharashtra on 20 November 1962. He succeeded Yashwantrao Chavan, who had been appointed defence minister of India by Jawaharlal Nehru. Kannamwar had previously been buildings and communications minister in Chavan's cabinet.

== List of ministers ==
The ministry consisted of 16 cabinet ministers. The ministry also contained 15 deputy ministers.

Name	Office	Portfolio	Took office	Left office	Party
Marotrao Kannamwar	Chief Minister	General Administration; Buildings; Communications; Finance; Planning; Information and Public Relations; Public Works; Food and Drug Administration; Marketing; Khar Land Development; Departments or portfolios not allocated to any minister	20 November 1962	24 November 1963	INC
P. K. Sawant	Cabinet Minister	Home Affairs; Ex. Servicemen Welfare; Information Technology; Relief & Rehabilitation; Culture Affairs	20 November 1962	24 November 1963	INC
Gopalrao Bajirao Khedkar	Cabinet Minister	Rural Development; Environment and Climate Change; Textiles	20 November 1962	24 November 1963	INC
Shantilal Shah	Cabinet Minister	School Education; Medical Education; Woman and Child Development	20 November 1962	24 November 1963	INC
Vasantrao Naik	Cabinet Minister	Revenue; Transport; Soil and Water Conservation; Other Backward Classes	20 November 1962	24 November 1963	INC
S. K. Wankhede	Cabinet Minister	Industries; Mining Department; Law and Judiciary; Employment Guarantee	20 November 1962	24 November 1963	INC
Balasaheb Desai	Cabinet Minister	Agriculture; Horticulture; Protocol; Higher and Technical Education; Dairy Development	20 November 1962	24 November 1963	INC
Shankarrao Chavan	Cabinet Minister	Irrigation; Power; Urban Development; Command Area Development	20 November 1962	24 November 1963	INC
Homi J. H. Taleyarkhan	Cabinet Minister	Civil Supplies; Housing; Printing Presses; Fisheries; Small Savings; Tourism	20 November 1962	24 November 1963	INC
D. S. Palapsagar	Cabinet Minister	Forests; Sports and Youth Welfare; Tribal Development; Sanitation	20 November 1962	24 November 1963	INC
Abdul Kader Salebhoy	Cabinet Minister	Prohibition; State Excise; Minority Development and Waqfs; Water Supply	20 November 1962	24 November 1963	INC
Nirmala Raje Bhosale	Cabinet Minister	Social Welfare; Parliamentary Affairs; Socially and Educationally Backward Classes	20 November 1962	24 November 1963	INC
M. D. Choudhary	Cabinet Minister	Public Health; Special Assistance; Skill Development, Employment and Entrepreneurship; Marathi Language; Majority Welfare	20 November 1962	24 November 1963	INC
M. G. Mane	Cabinet Minister	Labour; Ports Development; Disaster Management; Nomadic Tribesl Department; Vimukta Jati	20 November 1962	24 November 1963	INC
Keshavrao Sonawane	Cabinet Minister	Cooperation; Special Backward Classes Welfare; Animal Husbandry Department; Earthquake Rehabilitation	20 November 1962	24 November 1963	INC
G. D. Patil	Deputy Minister	Industry and planning	20 November 1962	24 November 1963	INC
N. N. Kailas	Deputy Minister	Public health	20 November 1962	24 November 1963	INC
Y. J. Mohite	Deputy Minister	Home	20 November 1962	24 November 1963	INC
N. M. Tidke	Deputy Minister	Rural development	20 November 1962	24 November 1963	INC
M. A. Vairale	Deputy Minister	Irrigation and power	20 November 1962	24 November 1963	INC
R. A. Patil	Deputy Minister	Revenue	20 November 1962	24 November 1963	INC
H. G. Vartak	Deputy Minister	Education	20 November 1962	24 November 1963	INC
B. J. Khatal	Deputy Minister	Cooperation	20 November 1962	24 November 1963	INC
Rafiq Zakaria	Deputy Minister	Buildings and communications	20 November 1962	24 November 1963	INC
D. K. Khanvilkar	Deputy Minister	Labour and khar land development	20 November 1962	24 November 1963	INC
S. L. Kadam	Deputy Minister	Forests and prohibition	20 November 1962	24 November 1963	INC
N. S. Patil	Deputy Minister	Civil Supplies; housing; printing presses; fisheries; and small savings	20 November 1962	24 November 1963	INC
S. B. Patil	Deputy Minister	Agriculture	20 November 1962	24 November 1963	INC
K. P. Patil	Deputy Minister	Social welfare	20 November 1962	24 November 1963	INC
D. S. Jagtap	Deputy Minister	Legislative affairs and urban development	20 November 1962	24 November 1963	INC
