= First Deshmukh ministry =

Regional government in India

- Ministry of Maharashtra
- Vilasrao Deshmukh, Former Chief Minister of Maharashtra
- Date formed: 18 October 1999
- Date dissolved: 16 January 2003

People and organisations
- Head of state: Governor P. C. Alexander (1999–2002); Governor Mohammed Fazal (2002-03)
- Head of government: Vilasrao Deshmukh
- No. of ministers: 26 Cabinet ministers Congress (12); NCP (12); PWP (1); BBM (1)
- Member parties: Congress; NCP; Other smaller parties and independents
- Status in legislature: Coalition
- Opposition party: Shiv Sena; BJP
- Opposition leader: Narayan Rane (Shiv Sena) (Assembly); Nitin Gadkari (BJP) (Council)

History
- Election: 1999
- Legislature term: 5 years
- Predecessor: Narayan Rane ministry
- Successor: Shinde ministry

The Indian National Congress politician Vilasrao Deshmukh formed his first government after the 1999 Maharashtra Legislative Assembly election. The government consisted of Deshmukh's Congress party, Nationalist Congress Party, several smaller parties, and independent politicians. Deshmukh was sworn in on 18 October 1999 and continued as Chief Minister until his resignation on 16 January 2003.

== Government formation ==
The 1999 elections had returned Congress as the largest legislative party with 75 out of the State's 288 legislative assembly seats. Deshmukh, who had previously served as a cabinet minister in the State was subsequently supported by the Nationalist Congress Party, Peasants and Workers Party of India, Bharipa Bahujan Mahasangh, Republican Party of India (Gavai), Republican Party of India (Athawale), Samajwadi Party, Janata Dal (Secular), and Independents. The Communist Party of India (Marxist) supported the government from outside.

The ministry had initially consisted of 61 member. However, coalition partner NCP was concerned with the large size of the cabinet. As a compromise, Deshmukh agreed that his Congress party would drop one cabinet minister and three ministers of state, while the NCP would ask two of its junior ministers to resign.

== List of ministers ==
The cabinet consisted of 55 members - Deshmukh, his Deputy Chhagan Bhujbal, 24 cabinet ministers, and 29 ministers of state.

=== Cabinet ministers ===
The following ministers were allocated portfolios in October 1999.

Portfolio	Minister	Took office	Left office	Party
Chief Minister.: General Administration; Information and Publicity; Information Technology; Urban Development; Departments or portfolios not allocated to any minister.	Vilasrao Deshmukh	18 October 1999	16 January 2003	INC
Deputy Chief Minister: Home; Social Justice (18 October 1999 – 3 May 2001); Special Assistance (18 October 1999 – 3 May 2001); Majority Welfare Development	Chhagan Bhujbal	18 October 1999	16 January 2003	NCP
Cabinet Minister: Environment; Forests; State Border Defence (First)	Surupsingh Hirya Naik	19 October 1999	16 January 2003	INC
Cabinet Minister: Industries; Mining Department; Soil and Water Conservation (19 October 1999 – 02 March 2001)	Patangrao Kadam	19 October 1999	16 January 2003	INC
Cabinet Minister: Revenue; Protocol	Ashok Chavan	19 October 1999	16 January 2003	INC
Cabinet Minister: Labour; Minority Development and Aukaf; Ports	Husain Dalwai	19 October 1999	16 January 2003	INC
Cabinet Minister: Social Welfare / Social Justice (03 May 2001 – 16 January 2003); Women and Child Development (19 October 1999 – 09 September 2001); Nomadic Tribes Development; Special Backward Classes Welfare; Skill Development, Entrepreneurship; Other Backward Bahujan Welfare	Jaywantrao Awale	19 October 1999	16 January 2003	INC
Cabinet Minister: Transport; Employment and Self-employment; Employment Guarantee (09 September 2001 – 16 January 2003)	Shivajirao Moghe	19 October 1999	16 January 2003	INC
Cabinet Minister: Irrigation; Energy; Command Area Development; Socially And Educationally *Backward Classes; Soil and Water Conservation (02 March 2001 – 16 January 2003)	Padamsinh Patil	19 October 1999	16 January 2003	NCP
Cabinet Minister: Public Works (Excluding Public Undertakings); State Border Defence (Second)	Vijaysinh Mohite-Patil	19 October 1999	16 January 2003	NCP
Cabinet Minister: Tribal Development; Special Assistance (03 May 2001 – 16 January 2003)	Madhukar Pichad	19 October 1999	16 January 2003	NCP
Cabinet Minister: Horticulture; Irrigation (Krishna Valley Development); Irrigation (Konkan Valley Development)	Ajit Pawar	19 October 1999	16 January 2003	NCP
Cabinet Minister: Public Works (Including Public Undertakings); Co-operation	Vikramsinh Patankar	19 October 1999	16 January 2003	NCP
Cabinet Minister: Marketing; Employment Guarantee (19 October 1999 – 09 September 2001); Tourism; Woman and Child Development (09 September 2001 – 16 January 2003)	Ganpatrao Deshmukh	19 October 1999	16 January 2003	PWPI
*Housing: House Repairs and Reconstruction; Parliamentary Affairs	Rohidas Patil	27 October 1999	16 January 2003	INC
Cabinet Minister: Agriculture; Textile; Khar Land Development	Ranjeet Deshmukh	27 October 1999	16 January 2003	INC
Cabinet Minister: Law and Judiciary; Earthquake Rehabilitation; Relief And Rehabilitation; Ex-servicemen's Welfare	Vilas Patil	27 October 1999	16 January 2003	INC
Cabinet Minister: Animal Husbandry; Dairy Development	Anand Devkate	27 October 1999	16 January 2003	INC
Cabinet Minister: School Education; Sports and Youth Welfare; Cultural Affairs; Marathi Language	Ramkrishna More	27 October 1999	16 January 2003	INC
Cabinet Minister: Food and Civil Supplies; Consumer Protection; Food and Drug Administration	Datta Meghe	27 October 1999	16 January 2003	NCP
Cabinet Minister: Excise; Medicinal Drugs; Vimukta Jati; Other Backward Classes	Vasant Chavan	27 October 1999	16 January 2003	NCP
Cabinet Minister: Public Health and Family Welfare; Medical Education	Digvijay Khanvilkar	27 October 1999	16 January 2003	NCP
Cabinet Minister: Rural Development; Panchayat Raj; Water Supply; Cleanliness	R. R. Patil	27 October 1999	16 January 2003	NCP
Cabinet Minister: Higher and Technical Education	Dilip Walse-Patil	27 October 1999	16 January 2003	NCP
Cabinet Minister: Finance; Planning	Jayant Patil	27 October 1999	16 January 2003	NCP
Cabinet Minister: Trade; Commerce; Fisheries	Makhram Pawar	27 October 1999	16 January 2003	BBM
Cabinet Minister: Minister without Portfolio, *Disaster Management	Satish Chaturvedi	27 October 1999	31 October 1999	INC

=== Ministers of state ===
The ministers also included the following ministers of state.

Minister of state	Portfolio	Party
Manikrao Thakre	Home Affairs (Rural), Employment Guarantee Scheme, and Parliamentary Affairs	Congress
Vasudhatai Pundlikrao Deshmukh	Finance, Planning, and Public Works	Congress
Kripashankar Singh	Home Affairs (Urban) and Medicines	Congress
Eknath Gaikwad	Public Health, Medical Education, and Family Welfare	Congress
Balasaheb Thorat	Public Works and Command Area Development	Congress
Chandrakant alias Balasaheb Shivarkar	Public Works (Public Projects) and Excise	Congress
Anees Ahmed	Higher and Technical Education	Congress
Rajendra Darda	Energy and Tourism	Congress
Prakashanna Awade	Textiles, Tribal Development, and Special Assistance	Congress
Basavraj Madhavrao Patil	Rural Development	Congress
Mohammed Arif Khan	Food and Civil Supplies, and Consumer Protection	Congress
A. T. Pawar	Tribal welfare	NCP
Laxman Dhoble	General Administration, Social Welfare, and Marketing	NCP
Babasaheb Kupekar	Cooperation	NCP
Anil Deshmukh	School Education, Information	NCP
Jaydattaji Kshirsagar	Industries, Parliamentary Affairs, Trade and Commerce, and Mining	NCP
Hemant Deshmukh	Labour, Employment and Self-employment	NCP
Vimal Mundada	Women and Child Welfare, Law and Judiciary, Earthquake Rehabilitation and Relief	NCP
Ramraje Naik Nimbalkar	Revenue and Rehabilitation	NCP
Sunil Tatkare	Urban Development, Urban Land Ceiling, and Ports	NCP
Subhash Thakre	Forests and Environment	NCP
N. P. Hirani	Protocol and Prohibition Publicity	NCP
Meenakshi Patil	Cultural Affairs and Fisheries	Shekapa
Mohan Mahadev Patil	Horticulture, Nomadic Tribes, and Backward Class Development	Shekapa
Sulekha Kumbhare	Water Supply and Cleanliness	RPI(G)
Dada Jadhavrao	Agriculture, and Ex-servicemen's Welfare	JD(S)
Ajit Ghorpade	Irrigation (Krishna Valley and Konkan Irrigation Corporation)	Independent
Sanjay Deshmukh	Sports and Youth Affairs	Independent
Nawab Malik	Housing, Slum Development, House Repairs, and Wakf	SP
Gangadhar Gade	Transport	RPI(A)

== Guardian Ministers ==
Sr No.	District	Guardian_Minister	Party
01	Ahmednagar	Ashok Chavan (Cabinet Minister)	United Progressive Alliance
02	Akola	Vasant Chavan (Cabinet Minister)	United Progressive Alliance
03	Amravati	Chhagan Bhujbal (Deputy Chief Minister)	United Progressive Alliance
04	Aurangabad	Jayant Patil (Cabinet Minister)	United Progressive Alliance
05	Beed	Dilip Walse-Patil (Cabinet Minister)	United Progressive Alliance
06	Bhandara	Datta Meghe (Cabinet Minister)	United Progressive Alliance
07	Buldhana	Husain Dalwai (Cabinet Minister)	United Progressive Alliance
08	Chandrapur	Makhram Pawar (Cabinet Minister)	United Progressive Alliance
09	Dhule	Surupsingh Hirya Naik (Cabinet Minister)	United Progressive Alliance
10	Gadchiroli	R. R. Patil (Cabinet Minister)	United Progressive Alliance
11	Gondiya	Ramkrishna More (Cabinet Minister)	United Progressive Alliance
12	Hingoli	Anees Ahmed (Minister of State)	United Progressive Alliance
13	Jalgaon	Anand Devkate (Cabinet Minister)	United Progressive Alliance
14	Jalna	Vilas Patil (Cabinet Minister)	United Progressive Alliance
15	Kolhapur	Satish Chaturvedi (Cabinet Minister)	United Progressive Alliance
16	Latur	Jaywantrao Awale (Cabinet Minister)	United Progressive Alliance
17	Mumbai City	R. R. Patil (Cabinet Minister)	United Progressive Alliance
18	Mumbai Suburban	Ranjeet Deshmukh (Cabinet Minister)	United Progressive Alliance
19	Nagpur	Patangrao Kadam (Cabinet Minister)	United Progressive Alliance
20	Nanded	Ashok Chavan (Cabinet Minister)	United Progressive Alliance
21	Nandurbar	Surupsingh Hirya Naik (Cabinet Minister)	United Progressive Alliance
22	Nashik	Chhagan Bhujbal (Deputy Chief Minister)	United Progressive Alliance
23	Osmanabad	Padamsinh Patil (Cabinet Minister)	United Progressive Alliance
25	Parbhani	Balasaheb Thorat (Minister of State)	United Progressive Alliance
26	Pune	Ajit Pawar (Cabinet Minister)	United Progressive Alliance
27	Raigad	Rohidas Patil (Cabinet Minister)	United Progressive Alliance
28	Ratnagiri	Ganpatrao Deshmukh (Cabinet Minister)	United Progressive Alliance
29	Sangli	Patangrao Kadam (Cabinet Minister)	United Progressive Alliance
30	Satara	Vikramsinh Patankar (Cabinet Minister)	United Progressive Alliance
31	Sindhudurg	Eknath Gaikwad (Minister of State)	United Progressive Alliance
32	Solapur	Vijaysinh Mohite-Patil (Cabinet Minister)	United Progressive Alliance
33	Thane	Husain Dalwai (Cabinet Minister)	United Progressive Alliance
34	Wardha	Shivajirao Moghe (Cabinet Minister)	United Progressive Alliance
35	Washim	Jaywantrao Awale (Cabinet Minister)	United Progressive Alliance
36	Yavatmal	Madhukar Pichad (Cabinet Minister)	United Progressive Alliance
