= Balasaheb Desai =

Indian politician (1910–1983)

7th Speaker of the House Maharashtra Legislative Assembly
- In office 4 July 1977 – 13 March 1978
- Governor: Sadiq Ali (freedom fighter)
- Chief Minister: Vasantdada Patil
- Preceded by: S. K. Wankhede
- Succeeded by: Shivraj Patil
- Constituency: Patan

1st Education Minister of Maharashtra
- In office 1 May 1960 – 7 March 1962
- Succeeded by: Shantilal Shah

Home Minister of Maharashtra
- In office 5 December 1963 – 1 March 1967
- Preceded by: P. K. Sawant
- Succeeded by: Vasantrao Naik

Member of Maharashtra Legislative Assembly
- In office 1962–1983
- Preceded by: Constituency Established
- Succeeded by: Vikramsinh Patankar
- Constituency: Patan

Member of Bombay Legislative Assembly
- In office 1952–1962
- Succeeded by: Constituency Abolished
- Constituency: Patan, Maharashtra

Personal details
- Born: 10 March 1910 Vihe, Tal Patan, Satara, British India
- Died: 24 April 1983 (aged 73) Mumbai, Maharastra
- Party: Indian National Congress
- Other political affiliations: Peasants and Workers Party of India
- Spouse: Vatsalabai
- Children: 6
- Relatives: Shambhuraj Desai (grandson) Raviraj Desai (grandson)

Balasaheb Desai (Daulatrao Shripatrao Desai; 10 March 1910 – 24 April 1983) was a politician and social worker from Maharashtra, India, who held important positions in the Maharashtra state government as home minister, education minister and cultural minister during the initial formation of the Maharashtra state. He was instrumental in establishing Shivaji University in Kolhapur in 1962.

== Career ==
Desai started his law practice in Patan, Karad, Satara district. In 1940, he campaigned for election to the district local board and was elected president. In 1952, he was elected as the member of the legislative assembly (MLA) from Patan and was re-elected in 1957. In the same year, he became a state cabinet minister. He was the main minister in the bilingual state government of Bombay state as well as Maharashtra's government. He played a leading role in the Samyukta Maharashtra Movement and dealt firmly with any outbreaks of violence during its activities in Bombay. In 1960, Desai was education minister of Maharashtra state. He insured that children of the poor, those whose incomes were not more than Rs.1200 per annum, received an education through Economically Backward Classes (E.B.C.) facilities. In 1962, he became agriculture minister and in the same year he was asked to take on the responsibility of being the home minister.In the history of Maharashtra government, Desai is seen as one of strongest home ministers to date. He took steps to make the Home and Police Department strong and reliable. He handled many critical situations during his term as home minister including the outbreak of violence by members of the Samyukta Maharashtra Movement in Bombay (now Mumbai).

On 11 December 1967, a disastrous earthquake took place in Patan. His tireless work to help the people of Maharashtra recover from the disaster was widely appreciated. He came to be known as a true leader of the poor. The journalist Pralhad Keshav Atre called him "Loknete".

He was elected MLA for his constituency three times and secured a place in the cabinet of the Maharashtra government. He was speaker of Maharashtra Vidhan Sabha from 4 July 1977 to 14 March 1978. In 1978–79 he was president of Maharashtra Assembly.

== Co-operative movement ==
Desai established a sugar factory called Loknete Balasaheb Desai Sahakari Sakhar Karkhana in Patan. This sugar mill was started as a co-operative to provide stability and the opportunity for growth for farmers in the region. Desai worked closely with prominent co-operative figures in Maharashtra such as Yashwantrao Chavan, Vasantdada Patil and Gulabrao Patil.

== Shivaji University, Kolhapur ==
Desai was an educational minister in the first cabinet of the Maharashtra government in 1960. He was instrumental in establishing Shivaji University in Kolhapur in 1962. He also established Balasaheb Desai College of Arts and Science in 1969 at Patan.
