= First Pawar ministry =

- Ministry of the State of Maharashtra
- Date formed: 18 July 1978
- Date dissolved: 18 February 1980

People and organisations
- Head of government: Sharad Pawar INC(S)
- Total no. of members: 181
- Member parties: Janata Party+ (99); INC(S) (69); PWPI (13)
- Status in legislature: Coalition
- Opposition party: Indian National Congress

History
- Election: 1978
- Legislature term: 5 Years
- Predecessor: Second Vasantdada Patil ministry
- Successor: Antulay ministry

Sharad Pawar broke away in 1978 from Government of Maharashtra led by Vasantdada Patil of Indian National Congress, formed the Indian National Congress (Socialist), allied with the Janata party and the Peasants' and Workers' Party of India (PWP) to form a coalition government of the Progressive Democratic Front (PDF) or Purogami Lokshahi Aghadi. The Progressive Democratic Front government was sworn in on 18 July 1978. This government was dismissed on 18 February 1980 following Indira Gandhi's return to power at the Centre.

== Cabinet Ministers ==
SI No.	Name	Constituency	Department	Party
Chief Minister
1	Sharad Pawar	Baramati	General Administration; Home; Planning; Law Judiciary.; Information Public Relations.; Information Technology.; Public Works; (Including Public Undertakings)	Indian National Congress (Socialist)
Deputy Chief Minister
2	Sundarrao Solanke	Majalgaon	Finance; Disaster Management; Tribal Development	Indian National Congress (Socialist)
Cabinet Ministers
3	Uttamrao Patil	Paola - Bhadgaon	Revenue; Relief & Rehabilitation; Special Assistance	Janata Party
4	Hashu Advani	Chembur	Urban Development; Marketing; Skill Development, Employment Entrepreneurship	Janata Party
5	Sadanand Varde	Vandre	School Education (18 July 1978 - 19 November 1979); State Excise; Prohibition; Forests (18 July 1978 - 19 November 1979)	Janata Party
6	Jagannathrao Jadhav	Sangameshwar	Food & Civil Supply; Consumer Affairs; Housing; Ex. Servicemen Welfare	Janata Party
7	Ganpatrao Deshmukh	Sangole	Horticulture; Protocol; Forest (19 November 1979 - 18 February 1980); Mining.; Marathi Language.; Earthquake Rehabilitation	Peasants and Workers Party of India
8	Shankarrao Chavan	Bhokar	Jails; Water Resources; Command Area Development; Industry.	Indian National Congress (Socialist)
9	Arjunrao Kasture		Agriculture; Water supply (18 July 1978 - 19 November 1979); Medical Education; School Education (19 November 1979 - 18 February 1980)	Indian National Congress (Socialist)
10	N. D. Patil	MLC	Co-operation; Animal Husbandry.; Dairy Development (18 July 1978 - 25 May 1979); Sports, Youth Welfare	Peasants and Workers Party of India
11	Nihal Ahmed Maulavi Mohammed Usman	Malegaon	Technical, Higher Education; Minority Affairs; Revenue.; Rural Development.; Ports.; Khar, Development.	Janata Party
12	Govindrao Adik	Shrirampur	Women, child development; Transport.; Parliamentary Affairs.; Social Justice	Indian National Congress (Socialist)
13	Sushilkumar Shinde	Solapur North	Soil, Water Conservation; Dairy Development (25 May 1979 - 18 February 1980); Fisheries; Labour; Tourism; Majority Welfare Development; Other Backward Bahujan Welfare	Indian National Congress (Socialist)
14	Bhausaheb Surve	Nagpur Central	Other Backward Classes.; Socially, Educationally, Backward Classes.; Vimukta Jati.; Nomadic Tribes.; Special Backward Classes Welfare	Indian National Congress (Socialist)
15	Pramila Tople		Public Health, Family; Welfare: Environment; Water Supply (19 November 1979 - 18 February 1980); Sanitation	Indian National Congress (Socialist)
16	Hashmukhbhai Upadhaya	Kandivali	Food, Drug; Administration; Textile; Cultural Affairs	Janata Party
17	Chhedilal Gupta		Public Works; (Excluding Public Undertakings): Energy; Employment Guarantee	Janata Party

== Ministers of State ==
SI No.	Name	Constituency	Department	Party
1	Bhai Vaidya	Bhavani Peth	Home	Janata Party
2	Datta Meghe	MLC		Indian National Congress (Socialist)
3	Shankarrao Kale	Ahmednagar	Education; Co-operation	Indian National Congress (Socialist)
4	Prataprao Baburao Bhosale	Wai		Indian National Congress (Socialist)
5	Dilversingh Padvi	Akkalkuwa	Planning; Social Justice; Public Works	Indian National Congress (Socialist)
6	Dr. Ishaq Jamkhanawala	Nagpada	Housing; Finance; Waqf; Labour; Protocol	Janata Party
7	Kisanrao Deshmukh		Consumer Affairs; Food & Civil Supply	Indian National Congress (Socialist)
8	Sakharam Nakhate	Pathri	Special Assistance; Skill Development	Indian National Congress (Socialist)
9	Shripatrao Bondre	Sangrul	Water Resources; Command Area Development	Indian National Congress (Socialist)
10	Bhaurao Mulak	Nagpur West		Indian National Congress (Socialist)
11	Balkrishna Patil	Khalapur		Indian National Congress (Socialist)
12	Vinayak Patil	Niphad	Environment Climate Change	Indian National Congress (Socialist)
13	Dr. Padamsinh Bajirao Patil	Osmanabad	Energy; Excise	Indian National Congress (Socialist)
14	Shanti Naik	Shivajinagar		Janata Party
15	Babanrao Dhakane	Pathardi		Indian National Congress (Socialist)
16	Namdeo Gadekar	Sillod		Indian National Congress (Socialist)
