= Patan, Maharashtra Assembly constituency =

Constituency of the Maharashtra legislative assembly in India

Coordinates: 17.37°N 73.90°E

Patan
- Constituency No. 261 for the Maharashtra Legislative Assembly

Constituency details
- Country: India
- Region: Western India
- State: Maharashtra
- District: Satara
- Lok Sabha constituency: Satara
- Established: 1951
- Total electors: 310,702
- Reservation: None

Member of Legislative Assembly
- 15th Maharashtra Legislative Assembly
- Incumbent Shambhuraj Desai
- Party: SHS
- Alliance: NDA
- Elected year: 2024

Patan Assembly constituency of Maharashtra Vidhan Sabha is one of the constituencies located in Satara district.

It is a part of Satara Lok Sabha constituency, along with five other assembly constituencies, viz Wai, Karad South, Koregaon, Satara and Karad North from the Satara district.

== Members of the Legislative Assembly ==
Election	Member	Party
1952	Daulatrao Shripatrao Desai	Indian National Congress
1962	Daulatrao Shripatrao Desai	Indian National Congress
1967	Daulatrao Shripatrao Desai	Indian National Congress
1972	Daulatrao Shripatrao Desai	Indian National Congress
1978	Daulatrao Shripatrao Desai	Janata Party
1980	Daulatrao Shripatrao Desai	Indian National Congress (I)
1985	Vikramsinh Ranjitsinh Patankar	Indian Congress (Socialist)
1990	Vikramsinh Ranjitsinh Patankar	Indian National Congress
1995	Vikramsinh Ranjitsinh Patankar	Indian National Congress
1999	Vikramsinh Ranjitsinh Patankar	Nationalist Congress Party
2004	Shambhuraj Shivajirao Desai	Shiv Sena
2009	Vikramsinh Ranjitsinh Patankar	Nationalist Congress Party
2014	Shambhuraj Shivajirao Desai	Shiv Sena
2019	Shambhuraj Shivajirao Desai	Shiv Sena
2024	Shambhuraj Shivajirao Desai	Shiv Sena

== Election results ==
=== Assembly Election 2024 ===
2024 Maharashtra Legislative Assembly election : Patan
Party	Candidate	Votes	%	±%
SS	Shambhuraj Shivajirao Desai	125,759	54.64%	▲2.23
Independent	Satyajit Vikramsinh Patankar	90,935	39.51%	New
SS(UBT)	Bhanupratap Alias Harshad Mohanrao Kadam	9,626	4.18%	New
NOTA	None of the above	1,339	0.58%	▼0.18
Margin of victory		34,824	15.13%	▲8.14
Turnout		231,484	74.50%	▲6.50
Total valid votes		230,145		
Registered electors		310,702		▲3.33
SS hold		Swing	▲2.23	

=== Assembly Election 2019 ===
2019 Maharashtra Legislative Assembly election : Patan
Party	Candidate	Votes	%	±%
SS	Shambhuraj Shivajirao Desai	106,266	52.41%	▲1.73
NCP	Satyajit Vikramsinh Patankar	92,091	45.42%	▲3.88
NOTA	None of the above	1,547	0.76%	▲0.49
BSP	Shivaji Bhimaji Kamble	1,473	0.73%	New
VBA	Ashokrao Tatoba Devkant	1,392	0.69%	New
Margin of victory		14,175	6.99%	▼2.15
Turnout		204,485	68.00%	▼5.51
Total valid votes		202,765		
Registered electors		300,692		▲6.94
SS hold		Swing	▲1.73	

=== Assembly Election 2014 ===
2014 Maharashtra Legislative Assembly election : Patan
Party	Candidate	Votes	%	±%
SS	Shambhuraj Shivajirao Desai	104,419	50.68%	▲2.85
NCP	Patankar Satyajit Vikramsinh	85,595	41.54%	▼6.61
INC	Patil Hindurao Shankarrao	7,642	3.71%	New
BJP	Deepak Bandu Mahadik	2,102	1.02%	New
Independent	Sagar Balasaheb Mane	2,084	1.01%	New
Independent	Dattatray Gunda Bhise	1,287	0.62%	New
NOTA	None of the above	550	0.27%	New
Margin of victory		18,824	9.14%	▲8.82
Turnout		206,700	73.51%	▼0.24
Total valid votes		206,039		
Registered electors		281,188		▲13.42
SS gain from NCP		Swing	▲2.53	

=== Assembly Election 2009 ===
2009 Maharashtra Legislative Assembly election : Patan
Party	Candidate	Votes	%	±%
NCP	Vikramsinh Ranjitsinh Patankar	87,917	48.15%	▲1.40
SS	Shambhuraj Shivajirao Desai	87,337	47.83%	▼3.05
MNS	Patil Avinash Tukaram	2,061	1.13%	New
Independent	Dr. Sandip Rajaram Mane	2,010	1.10%	New
BSP	Magare Nivrutti Sitaram	1,499	0.82%	▼0.27
Independent	Sarjerao Shankar Kamble	1,340	0.73%	New
Margin of victory		580	0.32%	▼3.80
Turnout		182,840	73.75%	▼7.38
Total valid votes		182,600		
Registered electors		247,921		▲41.58
NCP gain from SS		Swing	▼2.73	

=== Assembly Election 2004 ===
2004 Maharashtra Legislative Assembly election : Patan
Party	Candidate	Votes	%	±%
SS	Shambhuraj Shivajirao Desai	72,214	50.88%	▲4.21
NCP	Vikramsinh Ranjitsinh Patankar	66,363	46.75%	▼2.27
Independent	Mane Pranlal Kisan	1,815	1.28%	New
BSP	Magare Nivrutti Sitaram	1,548	1.09%	New
Margin of victory		5,851	4.12%	▲1.76
Turnout		142,063	81.13%	▲5.01
Total valid votes		141,940		
Registered electors		175,114		▲18.73
SS gain from NCP		Swing	▲1.86	

=== Assembly Election 1999 ===
1999 Maharashtra Legislative Assembly election : Patan
Party	Candidate	Votes	%	±%
NCP	Vikramsinh Ranjitsinh Patankar	53,336	49.02%	New
SS	Shambhuraj Shivajirao Desai	50,773	46.67%	New
INC	Patil Hindurao Shankarrao	4,157	3.82%	▼46.03
Margin of victory		2,563	2.36%	▲1.74
Turnout		112,268	76.12%	▼1.85
Total valid votes		108,802		
Registered electors		147,489		▼5.35
NCP gain from INC		Swing	▼0.83	

=== Assembly Election 1995 ===
1995 Maharashtra Legislative Assembly election : Patan
Party	Candidate	Votes	%	±%
INC	Vikramsinh Ranjitsinh Patankar	59,399	49.85%	▼9.51
Independent	Shambhuraj Shivajirao Desai	58,663	49.23%	New
Hindustan Janta Party	Palange Vasantrao Pandurang	793	0.67%	New
Margin of victory		736	0.62%	▼20.83
Turnout		121,505	77.97%	▲3.59
Total valid votes		119,150		
Registered electors		155,832		▲7.74
INC hold		Swing	▼9.51	

=== Assembly Election 1990 ===
1990 Maharashtra Legislative Assembly election : Patan
Party	Candidate	Votes	%	±%
INC	Vikramsinh Ranjitsinh Patankar	62,647	59.36%	▲16.65
Independent	Vijayadevi Shivajirao Desai	40,003	37.90%	New
BJP	More Pralhad Laxman	1,994	1.89%	New
Independent	Bansode Ramchandra Dnyandeo	825	0.78%	New
Margin of victory		22,644	21.45%	▲7.64
Turnout		107,577	74.38%	▼0.10
Total valid votes		105,546		
Registered electors		144,637		▲22.11
INC gain from IC(S)		Swing	▲2.84	

=== Assembly Election 1985 ===
1985 Maharashtra Legislative Assembly election : Patan
Party	Candidate	Votes	%	±%
IC(S)	Vikramsinh Ranjitsinh Patankar	48,873	56.52%	New
INC	Shivajirao (Abasaheb) Daulatrao Desai	36,930	42.71%	New
Independent	Palange Vasantrao Pandurang	663	0.77%	New
Margin of victory		11,943	13.81%	▲4.61
Turnout		88,224	74.48%	▲7.52
Total valid votes		86,466		
Registered electors		118,447		▲4.38
IC(S) gain from INC(I)		Swing	▲1.92	

=== Assembly Election 1983 by-election ===
1983 by-election Maharashtra Legislative Assembly election : Patan
Party	Candidate	Votes	%	±%
Independent	Vikramsinh Ranjitsinh Patankar	43,608	57.40%	
INC	Shivajirao (Abasaheb) Daulatrao Desai	32,364	42.60%	
Margin of victory		11,244	14.80%	▲
Turnout		78,320		▲
Total valid votes		75,972		
Registered electors		1,13,547		▲
Independent gain from INC(I)		Swing		

=== Assembly Election 1980 ===
1980 Maharashtra Legislative Assembly election : Patan
Party	Candidate	Votes	%	±%
INC(I)	Daulatrao Shripatrao Desai	40,483	54.60%	▲36.55
INC(U)	Vikramsinh Ranjitsinh Patankar	33,660	45.40%	New
Margin of victory		6,823	9.20%	▼46.03
Turnout		75,991	66.96%	▼3.98
Total valid votes		74,143		
Registered electors		113,481		▲5.27
INC(I) gain from JP		Swing	▼18.68	

=== Assembly Election 1978 ===
1978 Maharashtra Legislative Assembly election : Patan
Party	Candidate	Votes	%	±%
JP	Daulatrao Shripatrao Desai	54,312	73.28%	New
INC(I)	Desai Bhagvantrao Anandrao	13,378	18.05%	New
INC	Janugade Prataprao Abasheb	6,423	8.67%	▼89.75
Margin of victory		40,934	55.23%	▼41.62
Turnout		76,475	70.94%	▼6.44
Total valid votes		74,113		
Registered electors		107,803		▲20.11
JP gain from INC		Swing	▼25.14	

=== Assembly Election 1972 ===
1972 Maharashtra Legislative Assembly election : Patan
Party	Candidate	Votes	%	±%
INC	Daulatrao Shripatrao Desai	66,857	98.42%	New
PWPI	Raosaheb S. Patankar	1,071	1.58%	New
Margin of victory		65,786	96.85%	
Turnout		69,452	77.38%	
Total valid votes		67,928		
Registered electors		89,752		
INC hold		Swing		

=== Assembly Election 1967 ===
1967 Maharashtra Legislative Assembly election : Patan
Party	Candidate	Votes	%	±%
INC	Daulatrao Shripatrao Desai	Unopposed		
Registered electors		75,701		▲6.37
INC hold		Swing		

=== Assembly Election 1962 ===
1962 Maharashtra Legislative Assembly election : Patan
Party	Candidate	Votes	%	±%
INC	Daulatrao Shripatrao Desai	42,965	86.77%	▲36.63
PWPI	Balasaheb Ganpatrao Patankar	4,576	9.24%	▼40.62
Independent	Vithal Tukaram Ghadge	1,973	3.98%	New
Margin of victory		38,389	77.53%	▲77.25
Turnout		51,576	72.47%	▲10.28
Total valid votes		49,514		
Registered electors		71,168		▲24.97
INC hold		Swing	▲36.63	

=== Assembly Election 1952 ===
1952 Bombay State Legislative Assembly election : Patan
Party	Candidate	Votes	%	±%
INC	Daulatrao Shripatrao Desai	17,757	50.14%	New
PWPI	Chavan Dajisaheb Ramrao	17,658	49.86%	New
Margin of victory		99	0.28%	
Turnout		35,415	62.19%	
Total valid votes		35,415		
Registered electors		56,948		
INC win (new seat)				

== See also ==
- List of constituencies of Maharashtra Legislative Assembly
- Patan
