= Shantilal Shah =

Indian politician

Member of Parliament, Lok Sabha
- In office 1967-1971
- Succeeded by: Hari Ramchandra Gokhale
- Constituency: Mumbai North West

Personal details
- Born: 30 July 1898
- Party: Indian National Congress
- Spouse: Hira Laxmi

Shantilal Shah was an Indian politician, elected to the Lok Sabha, the lower house of the Parliament of India as a member of the Indian National Congress. He received his education at Elphinstone College and Gujarat College.
