= Prajakta Lavangare Verma =

Indian Administrative Service officer

Smt. Prajakata Lavangare Verma IAS
- Born: 02/09/1974
- Occupations: Joint Secretary, Department of Atomic Energy.
- Years active: April 2022 - present
- Organization: Government of India
- Notable work: Setup of Navi Mumbai Airport, Launching international programs to popularize Marathi
- Spouse: Sudip Verma
- Children: 1

Prajakata Lavangare Verma is an Indian Administrative Service officer. She was Secretary at the Marathi Language Department, Ministry of Marathi Language and she started international programs for the Marathi department. She became first ever woman to hold Divisional Commissioner of Nagpur Division post in June 2021. She was later transferred to Ministry of Textiles as Joint Secretary.

== Early life ==
Prajakata Lavangare Verma was born in a poor family. She worked hard to get education and received moral support from her family.

== Career ==
She joined Indian Administrative Service in 2001.

=== CEO of Ahmednagar ===
Lavangare Verma focused on empowering women in Ahmednagar district and launched various programs for them.

=== Navi Mumbai International Airport Project ===
Prajakata Lavangare Verma played an important role in the setup of Navi Mumbai Airport. Land acquisition was an issue as villagers were worried about rehabilitation. She took responsibility of 10 villages and they were rehabilitated during her tenure.

=== Excise department ===
She implemented various ambitious initiatives during her tenure at the Excise department. As Excise commissioner, she conducted raids in the Mumbai city to bust racket of bootleggers.

=== Marathi language department ===
Lavangare Verma joined Marathi language department in 2020. She started special programs to engage international Marathi diaspora. She launched various initiatives to popularize Marathi language outside India. US Consul General was felicitated for promoting US based organizations working in Marathi language.
