= Subhash Desai =

Indian politician

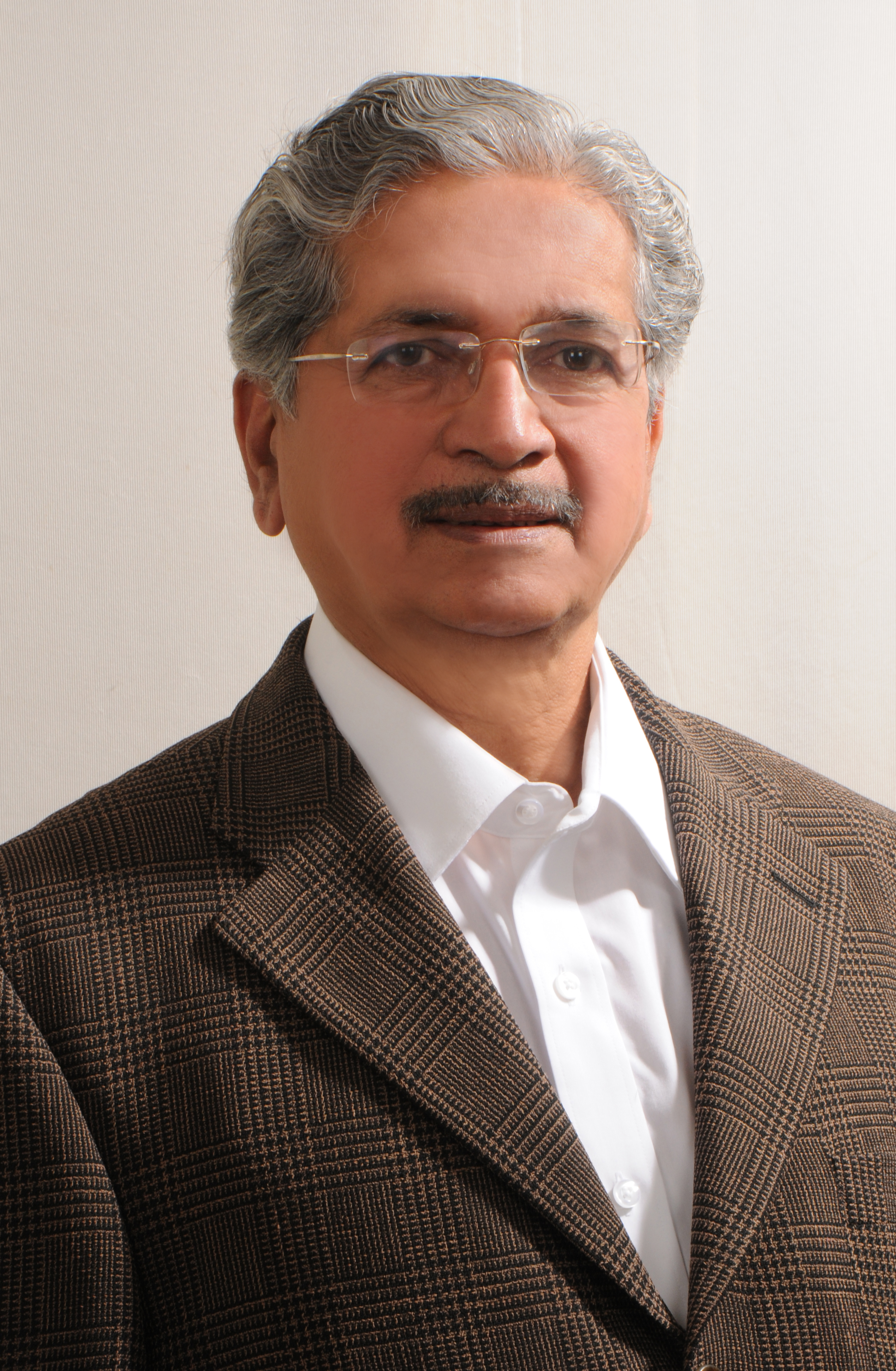

Cabinet Minister Government of Maharashtra
- In office 29 November 2019 – 29 June 2022
- Minister: Industries; Mining Department; Marathi Language; Urban Development Additional charge on 27 June 2022; Public Works (Including Public Undertakings) Additional charge on 27 June 2022; State Border Defence (Second) Additional charge on 27 June 2022
- Governor: Bhagat Singh Koshyari
- Chief Minister: Uddhav Thackeray
- Deputy CM: Ajit Pawar
- Guardian Minister: Aurangabad District (Chhatrapati Sambhajinagar)
- Preceded by: Himself (Acting) (Industries Ministry); Himself (Acting) (Mining Department Ministry); Himself (Acting) (Marathi Language Ministry); Eknath Shinde (Urban Development Ministry); Eknath Shinde (Public Works (Including Public Undertakings) Ministry); Eknath Shinde (State Border Defence Ministry)
- Succeeded by: Uday Samant (Industries Ministry); Dadaji Bhuse (Mining Department Ministry); Deepak Kesarkar (Marathi Language Ministry); Eknath Shinde CM (Urban Development Ministry); Eknath Shinde CM (Public Works (Including Public Undertakings) Ministry); Eknath Shinde CM Additional charge (State Border Defence Ministry)
- Incharge
- In office 28 November 2019 – 30 December 2019
- Minister: Industries; Mining Department; Higher and Technical Education; Sports and Youth Welfare; Agriculture; Employment Guarantee; Horticulture; Transport; Marathi Language; Cultural Affairs; Protocol; Earthquake Rehabilitation; Ports Development; Khar Land Development
- Governor: Bhagat Singh Koshyari
- Cabinet: Thackeray ministry
- Chief Minister: Uddhav Thackeray
- Preceded by: Himself (Industries Ministry); Himself (Mining Department Ministry); Vinod Tawde (Higher and Technical Education Ministry); Ashish Shelar (Sports and Youth Welfare Ministry); Anil Sukhdevrao Bonde (Agriculture Ministry); Jaydattaji Kshirsagar (Employment Guarantee Ministry); Jaydattaji Kshirsagar (Horticulture Ministry); Diwakar Raote ( Transport Ministry); Vinod Tawde (Marathi Language Ministry); Vinod Tawde (Cultural Affairs Ministry); Jayakumar Jitendrasinh Rawal (Protocol Ministry); Ram Shinde (Earthquake Rehabilitation Ministry); Devendra Fadnavis CM (Ports Development Ministry); Sambhaji Patil Nilangekar (Khar Land Development Ministry)
- Succeeded by: Himself (Industries Ministry); Himself (Mining Department Ministry); Uday Samant (Higher and Technical Education Ministry); Sunil Chhatrapal Kedar (Sports and Youth Welfare Ministry); Dadaji Bhuse (Agriculture Ministry); Sandipanrao Bhumre (Employment Guarantee Ministry); Sandipanrao Bhumre (Horticulture Ministry); Anil Parab ( Transport Ministry); Himself (Marathi Language Ministry); Amit Deshmukh (Cultural Affairs Ministry); Aaditya Thackeray (Protocol Ministry); Vijay Namdevrao Wadettiwar (Earthquake Rehabilitation Ministry); Aslam Shaikh (Ports Development Ministry); Vijay Namdevrao Wadettiwar (Khar Land Development Ministry)

Deputy Leader of the House Maharashtra Legislative Council
- In office 16 December 2019 – 29 June 2022
- Governor: Bhagat Singh Koshyari
- Chairman of the House: Ramraje Naik Nimbalkar
- Chief Minister: Uddhav Thackeray
- Leader of the House: Ajit Pawar
- Preceded by: Pankaja Munde
- Succeeded by: Uday Samant Additional Charge

Leader of the House of the Maharashtra Legislative Council
- Acting
- In office 16 December 2019 – 24 February 2020
- Governor: Bhagat Singh Koshyari
- Chairman of the House: Ramraje Naik Nimbalkar
- Chief Minister: Uddhav Thackeray
- Deputy Leader: Nitin Raut
- Preceded by: Chandrakant Bacchu Patil
- Succeeded by: Ajit Pawar

Member of Maharashtra Legislative Council
- In office 2015 – 07 July 2016
- Governor: C. Vidyasagar Rao
- Chairman of the House: Shivajirao Deshmukh; Ramraje Naik Nimbalkar
- Preceded by: Prithviraj Chavan
- Parliamentary group: Shivsena
- Constituency: Elected by MALs
- In office 08 July 2016 – 07 July 2022
- Governor: C. Vidyasagar Rao; Bhagat Singh Koshyari
- Chairman of the House: Ramraje Naik Nimbalkar
- Constituency: Elected by MALs

Cabinet Minister Government of Maharashtra
- In office 05 December 2014 – 12 November 2019
- Minister: Industries; Mining Department
- Governor: C. Vidyasagar Rao; Bhagat Singh Koshiyari
- Cabinet: First Fadnavis ministry
- Chief Minister: Devendra Fadnavis
- Guardian Minister: Mumbai City District
- Preceded by: Narayan Rane (Industries Ministry); Devendra Fadnavis CM (Mining Department Ministry)
- Succeeded by: Himself (Industries Ministry); Himself (Mining Department Ministry)

Leader of Shiv Sena Legislative Party Maharashtra Legislature
- In office 2009–2014
- Party President Shiv Sena: Bal Thackeray; Uddhav Thackeray
- Preceded by: Ramdas Kadam
- Succeeded by: Eknath Shinde
- Parliamentary group: Shiv Sena

Member of Maharashtra Legislative Assembly
- In office 2004–2014
- Preceded by: Nandkumar Kale
- Succeeded by: Vidya Thakur
- Constituency: Goregaon
- In office 1990–1995
- Preceded by: Mrinal Gore
- Succeeded by: Nandkumar Kale

Personal details
- Born: 12 July 1942 (age 83) Malgund, Bombay Presidency, British India
- Party: Shiv Sena
- Spouse: Sushma S. Desai
- Children: 3
- Occupation: Politician
- Website: official website

Subhash Desai (born 12 July 1942) is an Indian politician and leader of Shiv Sena from Maharashtra. He is a member of Maharashtra Legislative Council. He had represented Goregaon (Vidhan Sabha constituency) in 1990, 2004 and 2009. Desai took charge as the Cabinet Minister of Industries in 2014. He was also the guardian minister of Aurangabad district.

== Positions held ==
- 1990: Elected to Maharashtra Legislative Assembly (1st term)
- 2004: Re-Elected to Maharashtra Legislative Assembly (2nd term)
- 2009: Re-Elected to Maharashtra Legislative Assembly (3rd term)
- 2009-2014: Shiv Sena Legislature Party Leader in the Maharashtra Legislative Assembly
- 2005 Onwards: Leader, Shiv Sena
- 2014: Cabinet Minister of Industries (Marathi: उद्योग) in Maharashtra State Government
- 2014 - 2019: Guardian minister of Mumbai City district
- 2015: Elected to Maharashtra Legislative Council (1st term)
- 2016: Elected to Maharashtra Legislative Council (2nd term)
- 2016: Cabinet Minister of Industries (Marathi: उद्योग) and Mining in Maharashtra State Government
- 2019: Appointed minister of Industries, Mining and Marathi Language
- 2020: Appointed guardian minister of Aurangabad district
- 2022: Appointed minister of Urban Development and Public Works (Public Undertakings).

== See also ==
- Uddhav Thackeray ministry
- Devendra Fadnavis ministry

Political offices
Preceded by Rajendra Darda	Cabinet Minister for Industries, Maharashtra State; December 2014–present	Incumbent
Preceded by	Maharashtra State Guardian Minister for Mumbai City district December 2014–present	Incumbent
