= Eknath Shinde ministry =

Council of Ministers headed by Eknath Gangubhai Sambhaji Shinde

- 31st Cabinet of State of Maharashtra
- Date formed: 30 June 2022
- Date dissolved: 26 November 2024

People and organisations
- Governor: Bhagat Singh Koshyari (until 17 February 2023); Ramesh Bais (since 18 February 2023 till 31 July 2024); C. P. Radhakrishnan (from 31 July 2024)
- Chief Minister: Eknath Shinde (SHS)
- Deputy Chief Ministers: Devendra Fadnavis (BJP); Ajit Pawar (NCP)
- Member parties: SHS; BJP; NCP
- Status in legislature: Coalition
- Opposition party: INC; NCP SP; SS UBT
- Opposition leader: Vijay Namdevrao Wadettiwar (Indian National Congress) (Legislative Assembly); Ambadas Danve (SS (UBT)) (Legislative Council)

History
- Election: 2019
- Legislature terms: 4 years, 57 days
- Predecessor: Thackeray ministry
- Successor: Third Devendra Fadnavis ministry

Eknath Shinde was sworn in as the Chief Minister of Maharashtra on 30 June 2022, on resignation of his predecessor Uddhav Thackeray. Shinde led a government consisting of Shiv Sena, the NCP and the BJP.

== Formation ==
After the 2019 Maharashtra elections, Shiv Sena broke its pre-poll alliance with BJP. Instead, it formed a government with NCP and Congress. Uddhav Thackeray became the Chief Minister, and Shinde was the public works and urban development minister. In June 2022, alongside several Shiv Sena legislators, Shinde withdrew from the Thackeray government. Amidst a political crisis, Thackeray resigned. A day after the resignation, Shinde was sworn in, with support from his faction of Shiv Sena, BJP, and other smaller parties.

=== Vote of confidence ===
The Legislative Assembly held a vote of confidence in the Shinde government on 4 July 2022.

Motion of confidence Eknath Shinde (Shiv Sena (2022–present))
Ballot →	4 July 2022
Required majority →	Simple majority
Yes: • BJP (103); • SHS(R) (40); • BVA (3); • PJP (2); • RSP (1); • JSS (1); • MNS (1); • PWPI (1); • Independents (12)	164 / 288
No: • NCP (47); • Congress (33); • SSUBT (15); • CPI(M) (1); • SWP (1); • Independents (2)	99 / 288
Abstention: • SP (2); • AIMIM (1)	3 / 288
Absent: • Congress (11); • NCP (6); • BJP (2); • AIMIM (1)	20 / 288
Vacant seats	1 / 288
Speaker: • Rahul Narwekar (BJP) (1)	1 / 288

== Party breakdown in the legislature ==
=== Legislative Assembly ===
Government (200)
Mahayuti (200)

- BJP (105)
- SHS (44)
- NCP (41)
- PHJSP (2)
- RSP (2)
- IND (6)
200 / 288 (69%)

Official Opposition (76)
MVA (76)

- INC (45)
- NCP(SP) (14)
- SS(UBT) (12)
- SP (2)
- CPI(M) (1)
- AIMIM (1)
- IND (1)
76 / 288 (26%)

== Council of Ministers ==
=== Cabinet Ministers ===
Sr. No.	Name	Constituency	Portfolio	Party	Term of office		
Sr. No.	Name	Constituency	Portfolio	Party	Took office	Left office	Duration
Chief Minister
1.	Eknath Shinde	Kopri-Pachpakhadi	General Administration; Information Technology; Information and Public Relations; Urban Development; Transport; Social Justice; Environment and climate change; Mining; Ex. Servicemen Welfare; Majority Welfare Development; Earthquake Rehabilitation; Khar land Development; Disability Welfare; Socially and Educationally Backward Classes; Vimukta Jati; Nomadic Tribes; Special Backward Classes Welfare; Other departments not allocated to any Minister.	SS	30 June 2022	26 November 2024	(2 years, 149 days)
Deputy Chief Ministers
2.	Devendra Fadnavis	Nagpur South West	Home Affairs; Law and Judiciary; Water Resources; Command Area Development; Energy; Protocol	BJP	30 June 2022	26 November 2024	(2 years, 149 days)
3.	Ajit Pawar	Baramati	Finance; Planning	NCP	2 July 2023	26 November 2024	(1 year, 147 days)
Cabinet Ministers
4.	Radhakrishna Vikhe Patil	Shirdi	Revenue; Animal Husbandry; Dairy Development	BJP	14 August 2022	26 November 2024	(2 years, 104 days)
5.	Sudhir Mungantiwar	Ballarpur	Forests Department; Cultural Affairs; Fisheries Department	BJP	14 August 2022	26 November 2024	(2 years, 104 days)
6.	Chandrakant Patil	Kothrud	Higher Education and Technical Education; Textiles; Parliamentary Affairs; State Border Defence (First)	BJP	14 August 2022	26 November 2024	(2 years, 104 days)
7.	Vijaykumar Gavit	Nandurbar	Tribal Development	BJP	14 August 2022	26 November 2024	(2 years, 104 days)
8.	Girish Mahajan	Jamner	Rural Development; Tourism	BJP	14 August 2022	26 November 2024	(2 years, 104 days)
9.	Gulabrao Patil	Jalgaon Rural	Water Supply; Sanitation	SS	14 August 2022	26 November 2024	(2 years, 104 days)
10.	Dadaji Bhuse	Malegaon Outer	Public Works (Including Public Undertakings); Employment Guarantee (16 August 2024 - 26 November 2024); Horticulture (16 August 2024 - 26 November 2024)	SS	14 August 2022	26 November 2024	(2 years, 104 days)
11.	Sanjay Rathod	Digras	Soil and Water Conservation	SS	14 August 2022	26 November 2024	(2 years, 104 days)
12.	Suresh Khade	Miraj	Labour	BJP	14 August 2022	26 November 2024	(2 years, 104 days)
13.	Uday Samant	Ratnagiri	Industries	SS	14 August 2022	26 November 2024	(2 years, 104 days)
14.	Tanaji Sawant	Paranda	Public Health and Family Welfare	SS	14 August 2022	26 November 2024	(2 years, 104 days)
15.	Ravindra Chavan	Dombivali	Public Works (excluding Public Undertakings)	BJP	14 August 2022	26 November 2024	(2 years, 104 days)
16.	Abdul Sattar	Sillod	Minority Development and Aukaf; Marketing	SS	14 August 2022	26 November 2024	(2 years, 104 days)
17.	Deepak Kesarkar	Sawantwadi	School Education; Marathi Language	SS	14 August 2022	26 November 2024	(2 years, 104 days)
18.	Atul Save	Aurangabad East	Housing; Other Backward Classes; Other Backward Bahujan Welfare	BJP	14 August 2022	26 November 2024	(2 years, 104 days)
19.	Shambhuraj Desai	Patan	State Excise; State Border Defence (Second)	SS	14 August 2022	26 November 2024	(2 years, 104 days)
20.	Mangal Lodha	Malabar Hill	Skill Development And Entrepreneurship	BJP	14 August 2022	26 November 2024	(2 years, 104 days)
21.	Chagan Bhujbal	Yevla	Food and Civil Supplies; Consumer Affairs	NCP	2 July 2023	26 November 2024	(1 year, 147 days)
22.	Dilip Walse-Patil	Ambegaon	Co-operation	NCP	2 July 2023	26 November 2024	(1 year, 147 days)
23.	Dhananjay Munde	Parli	Agriculture	NCP	2 July 2023	26 November 2024	(1 year, 147 days)
24.	Hasan Mushrif	Kagal	Medical Education; Special Assistance	NCP	2 July 2023	26 November 2024	(1 year, 147 days)
25.	Dharamrao Aatram	Aheri	Food and Drug Administration	NCP	2 July 2023	26 November 2024	(1 year, 147 days)
26.	Aditi Tatkare	Shrivardhan	Woman and Child Development	NCP	2 July 2023	26 November 2024	(1 year, 147 days)
27.	Sanjay Bansode	Udgir	Sports and Youth Welfare; Ports Development	NCP	2 July 2023	26 November 2024	(1 year, 147 days)
28.	Anil Patil	Amalner	Relief and Rehabilitation; Disaster Management	NCP	2 July 2023	26 November 2024	(1 year, 147 days)

== District Wise break up ==
District	No	Name
Ahmednagar	1	Radhakrishna Vikhe Patil
Akola		
Amaravati		
Aurangabad	2	Abdul Sattar; Atul Save
Beed	1	Dhananjay Munde
Bhandara		
Buldhana		
Chandrapur	1	Sudhir Mungantiwar
Dhule		
Gadchiroli	1	Dhramrao Aatram
Gondiya		
Hingoli		
Jalgaon	3	Girish Mahajan; Gulabrao Patil; Anil Patil
Jalna		
Kolhapur	1	Hasan Mushrif
Latur	1	Sanjay Bansode
Mumbai City	1	Mangal Lodha
Mumbai Suburban		
Nagpur	1	Devendra Fadnavis (Deputy Chief Minister)
Nanded		
Nandurbar	1	Vijaykumar Gavit
Nashik	2	Dadaji Bhuse; Chhagan Bhujbal
Osmanabad	1	Tanaji Sawant
Palghar		
Parbhani		
Pune	3	Ajit Pawar (Deputy Chief Minister); Chandrakant Patil; Dilip Walse-Patil
Raigad	1	Aditi Tatkare
Ratnagiri	1	Uday Samant
Sangli	1	Suresh Khade
Satara	1	Shambhuraj Desai
Sindhudurg	1	Deepak Kesarkar
Solapur		
Thane	2	Eknath Shinde (Chief Minister); Ravindra Chavan
Wardha		
Washim		
Yavatmal	1	Sanjay Rathod
Total	29	

== Guardian Ministers ==
Sr No.	District	Guardian_Minister	Party	Tenure	
01	Ahmednagar (Ahilyanagar)	Radhakrishna Vikhe Patil	Bharatiya Janata Party	24 September 2022	26 November 2024
02	Akola	Devendra Fadnavis; Deputy Chief Minister	Bharatiya Janata Party	24 September 2022	4 October 2023
02	Akola	Radhakrishna Vikhe Patil	Bharatiya Janata Party	4 October 2023	26 November 2024
03	Amravati	Devendra Fadnavis; Deputy Chief Minister	Bharatiya Janata Party	24 September 2022	4 October 2023
03	Amravati	Chandrakant Patil	Bharatiya Janata Party	4 October 2023	26 November 2024
04	Chhatrapati Sambhajinagar (Aurangabad)	Sandipanrao Bhumre	Shiv Sena (2022-present)	24 September 2022	4 June 2024
04	Chhatrapati Sambhajinagar (Aurangabad)	Abdul Sattar; Additional Charge	Shiv Sena (2022-present)	4 June 2024	26 November 2024
05	Beed	Atul Save	Bharatiya Janata Party	24 September 2022	4 October 2023
05	Beed	Dhananjay Munde	Nationalist Congress Party	4 October 2023	26 November 2024
06	Bhandara	Devendra Fadnavis; Deputy Chief Minister	Bharatiya Janata Party	24 September 2022	4 October 2023
06	Bhandara	Vijaykumar Krishnarao Gavit	Bharatiya Janata Party	4 October 2023	26 November 2024
07	Buldhana	Gulab Raghunath Patil	Shiv Sena (2022-present)	24 September 2022	4 October 2023
07	Buldhana	Dilip Walse-Patil	Nationalist Congress Party	4 October 2023	26 November 2024
08	Chandrapur	Sudhir Mungantiwar	Bharatiya Janata Party	24 September 2022	26 November 2024
09	Dhule	Girish Mahajan	Bharatiya Janata Party	24 September 2022	26 November 2024
10	Gadchiroli	Devendra Fadnavis; Deputy Chief Minister	Bharatiya Janata Party	24 September 2022	26 November 2024
11	Gondiya	Sudhir Mungantiwar	Bharatiya Janata Party	24 September 2022	4 October 2023
11	Gondiya	Dharamraobaba Bhagwantrao Aatram	Nationalist Congress Party	4 October 2023	21 June 2024
11	Gondiya	Aditi Tatkare	Nationalist Congress Party	21 June 2024	26 November 2024
12	Hingoli	Abdul Sattar	Shiv Sena (2022-present)	24 September 2022	26 November 2024
13	Jalgaon	Gulab Raghunath Patil	Shiv Sena (2022-present)	24 September 2022	26 November 2024
14	Jalna	Atul Save	Bharatiya Janata Party	24 September 2022	26 November 2024
15	Kolhapur	Deepak Kesarkar	Shiv Sena (2022-present)	24 September 2022	4 October 2023
15	Kolhapur	Hasan Mushrif	Nationalist Congress Party	4 October 2023	26 November 2024
16	Latur	Girish Mahajan	Bharatiya Janata Party	24 September 2022	26 November 2024
17	Mumbai City	Deepak Kesarkar	Shiv Sena (2022-present)	24 September 2022	26 November 2024
18	Mumbai Suburban	Mangal Lodha	Bharatiya Janata Party	24 September 2022	26 November 2024
19	Nagpur	Devendra Fadnavis; Deputy Chief Minister	Bharatiya Janata Party	24 September 2022	26 November 2024
20	Nanded	Girish Mahajan	Bharatiya Janata Party	24 September 2022	26 November 2024
21	Nandurbar	Vijaykumar Krishnarao Gavit	Bharatiya Janata Party	24 September 2022	4 October 2023
21	Nandurbar	Anil Bhaidas Patil	Nationalist Congress Party	4 October 2023	26 November 2024
22	Nashik	Dadaji Bhuse	Shiv Sena (2022-present)	24 September 2022	26 November 2024
23	Dharashiv (Osmanabad)	Tanaji Sawant	Shiv Sena (2022-present)	24 September 2022	26 November 2024
24	Palghar	Ravindra Chavan	Bharatiya Janata Party	24 September 2022	26 November 2024
25	Parbhani	Tanaji Sawant	Shiv Sena (2022-present)	24 September 2022	4 October 2023
25	Parbhani	Sanjay Bansode	Nationalist Congress Party	4 October 2023	26 November 2024
26	Pune	Chandrakant Patil	Bharatiya Janata Party	24 September 2022	4 October 2023
26	Pune	Ajit Pawar; Deputy Chief Minister	Nationalist Congress Party	4 October 2023	26 November 2024
27	Raigad	Uday Samant	Shiv Sena (2022-present)	24 September 2022	26 November 2024
28	Ratnagiri	Uday Samant	Shiv Sena (2022-present)	24 September 2022	26 November 2024
29	Sangli	Suresh Khade	Bharatiya Janata Party	24 September 2022	26 November 2024
30	Satara	Shambhuraj Desai	Shiv Sena (2022-present)	24 September 2022	26 November 2024
31	Sindhudurg	Ravindra Chavan	Bharatiya Janata Party	24 September 2022	26 November 2024
32	Solapur	Radhakrishna Vikhe Patil	Bharatiya Janata Party	24 September 2022	4 October 2023
32	Solapur	Chandrakant Patil	Bharatiya Janata Party	4 October 2023	26 November 2024
33	Thane	Shambhuraj Desai	Shiv Sena (2022-present)	24 September 2022	26 November 2024
34	Wardha	Devendra Fadnavis; Deputy Chief Minister	Bharatiya Janata Party	24 September 2022	4 October 2023
34	Wardha	Sudhir Mungantiwar	Bharatiya Janata Party	4 October 2023	26 November 2024
35	Washim	Sanjay Rathod	Shiv Sena (2022-present)	24 September 2022	26 November 2024
36	Yavatmal	Sanjay Rathod	Shiv Sena (2022-present)	24 September 2022	26 November 2024

== By Departments ==
An alphabetical list of all the departments of Maharashtra Government with terms : Cabinet Ministers Update = 26 November 2024

Portfolio	Minister	Took office	Left office	Party
Ministry of General Administration	Eknath Shinde; Chief Minister Additional Charge	30 June 2022	14 August 2022	SS
Ministry of General Administration	Eknath Shinde; Chief Minister	14 August 2022	26 November 2024	SHS
Ministry of Law and Judiciary	Eknath Shinde; Chief Minister Additional Charge	30 June 2022	14 August 2022	SS
Ministry of Law and Judiciary	Devendra Fadnavis; Deputy Chief Minister	14 August 2022	26 November 2024	BJP
Ministry of Information and Public Relations	Eknath Shinde; Chief Minister Additional_Charge	30 June 2022	14 August 2022	SHS
Ministry of Information and Public Relations	Eknath Shinde; Chief Minister	14 August 2022	26 November 2024	SHS
Ministry of Information Technology	Eknath Shinde; Chief Minister Additional Charge	30 June 2022	14 August 2022	SHS
Ministry of Information Technology	Eknath Shinde; Chief Minister	14 August 2022	26 November 2024	SHS
Ministry of Forests Department	Eknath Shinde; Chief Minister Additional Charge	30 June 2022	14 August 2022	SHS
Ministry of Forests Department	Sudhir Mungantiwar	14 August 2022	26 November 2024	BJP
Ministry of Home Affairs	Eknath Shinde; Chief Minister Additional Charge	30 June 2022	14 August 2022	SHS
Ministry of Home Affairs	Devendra Fadnavis; Deputy Chief Minister	14 August 2022	26 November 2024	BJP
Ministry of State Border Defence	Eknath Shinde; Chief Minister Additional Charge	30 June 2022	16 October 2022	SHS
Ministry of State Border Defence	Chandrakant Patil (First)	16 October 2022	26 November 2024	BJP
Ministry of State Border Defence	Shambhuraj Desai (Second)	16 October 2022	26 November 2024	SHS
Ministry of Finance	Eknath Shinde; Chief Minister Additional Charge	30 June 2022	14 August 2022	SHS
Ministry of Finance	Devendra Fadnavis; Deputy Chief Minister	14 August 2022	14 July 2023	BJP
Ministry of Finance	Ajit Pawar; Deputy Chief Minister	14 July 2023	26 November 2024	NCP
Ministry of Planning	Eknath Shinde; Chief Minister Additional Charge	30 June 2022	14 August 2022	SHS
Ministry of Planning	Devendra Fadnavis; Deputy Chief Minister	14 August 2022	14 July 2023	BJP
Ministry of Planning	Ajit Pawar; Deputy Chief Minister	14 July 2023	26 November 2024	NCP
Ministry of State Excise	Eknath Shinde; Chief Minister Additional Charge	30 June 2022	14 August 2022	SHS
Ministry of State Excise	Shambhuraj Desai	14 August 2022	26 November 2024	SHS
Ministry of Water Resources	Eknath Shinde; Chief Minister Additional Charge	30 June 2022	14 August 2022	SHS
Ministry of Water Resources	Devendra Fadnavis; Deputy Chief Minister	14 August 2022	26 November 2024	BJP
Ministry of Command Area Development	Eknath Shinde; Chief Minister Additional Charge	30 June 2022	14 August 2022	SHS
Ministry of Command Area Development	Devendra Fadnavis; Deputy Chief Minister	14 August 2022	26 November 2024	BJP
Ministry of Public Works (Excluding Public Undertakings)	Eknath Shinde; Chief Minister Additional Charge	30 June 2022	14 August 2022	SHS
Ministry of Public Works (Excluding Public Undertakings)	Ravindra Chavan	14 August 2022	26 November 2024	BJP
Ministry of Public Works (Including Public Undertakings)	Eknath Shinde; Chief Minister Additional Charge	30 June 2022	14 August 2022	SHS
Ministry of Public Works (Including Public Undertakings)	Eknath Shinde; Chief Minister	14 August 2022	14 July 2023	SHS
Ministry of Public Works (Including Public Undertakings)	Dadaji Bhuse	14 July 2023	26 November 2024	SS
Ministry of Urban Development	Eknath Shinde; Chief Minister Additional Charge	30 June 2022	14 August 2022	SHS
Ministry of Urban Development	Eknath Shinde; Chief Minister	14 August 2022	26 November 2024	SHS
Ministry of Revenue	Eknath Shinde; Chief Minister Additional Charge	30 June 2022	14 August 2022	SHS
Ministry of Revenue	Radhakrishna Vikhe Patil	14 August 2022	26 November 2024	BJP
Ministry of Industries	Eknath Shinde; Chief Minister Additional Charge	30 June 2022	14 August 2022	SHS
Ministry of Industries	Uday Samant	14 August 2022	26 November 2024	SHS
Ministry of Mining Department	Eknath Shinde; Chief Minister Additional Charge	30 June 2022	14 August 2022	SHS
Ministry of Mining Department	Dadaji Bhuse	14 August 2022	14 July 2023	SHS
Ministry of Mining Department	Eknath Shinde; Chief Minister	14 July 2023	26 November 2024	SHS
Ministry of Marathi Language	Eknath Shinde; Chief Minister Additional Charge	30 June 2022	14 August 2022	SHS
Ministry of Marathi Language	Deepak Kesarkar	14 August 2022	26 November 2024	SHS
Ministry of Energy, New and Renewable Energy	Eknath Shinde; Chief Minister Additional Charge	30 June 2022	14 August 2022	SHS
Ministry of Energy, New and Renewable Energy	Devendra Fadnavis; Deputy Chief Minister	14 August 2022	26 November 2024	BJP
Ministry of Transport	Eknath Shinde; Chief Minister Additional Charge	30 June 2022	14 August 2022	SHS
Ministry of Transport	Eknath Shinde; Chief Minister	14 August 2022	26 November 2024	SHS
Ministry of Parliamentary Affairs	Eknath Shinde; Chief Minister Additional Charge	30 June 2022	14 August 2022	SHS
Ministry of Parliamentary Affairs	Chandrakant Patil	14 August 2022	26 November 2024	BJP
Housing	Eknath Shinde; Chief Minister Additional Charge	30 June 2022	14 August 2022	SHS
Housing	Devendra Fadnavis; Deputy Chief Minister	14 August 2022	14 July 2023	BJP
Housing	Atul Save	14 July 2023	26 November 2024	BJP
Woman and Child Development	Eknath Shinde; Chief Minister Additional Charge	30 June 2022	14 August 2022	SHS
Woman and Child Development	Mangal Lodha	14 August 2022	14 July 2023	BJP
Woman and Child Development	Aditi Sunil Tatkare	14 July 2023	26 November 2024	NCP
Water Supply	Eknath Shinde; Chief Minister Additional Charge	30 June 2022	14 August 2022	SHS
Water Supply	Gulab Raghunath Patil	14 August 2022	26 November 2024	SS
Sanitation	Eknath Shinde; Chief Minister Additional Charge	30 June 2022	14 August 2022	SHS
Sanitation	Gulab Raghunath Patil	14 August 2022	26 November 2024	SHS
Food, Civil Supplies and Consumer	Eknath Shinde; Chief Minister Additional Charge	30 June 2022	14 August 2022	SHS
Food, Civil Supplies and Consumer	Ravindra Chavan	14 August 2022	14 July 2023	BJP
Food, Civil Supplies and Consumer	Chagan Bhujbal	14 July 2023	26 November 2024	NCP
Tribal Development	Eknath Shinde; Chief Minister Additional Charge	30 June 2022	14 August 2022	SHS
Tribal Development	Vijaykumar Gavit	14 August 2022	26 November 2024	BJP
Environment and Climate Change	Eknath Shinde; Chief Minister Additional Charge	30 June 2022	14 August 2022	SHS
Environment and Climate Change	Eknath Shinde; Chief Minister	14 August 2022	26 November 2024	SHS
Tourism	Eknath Shinde; Chief Minister Additional Charge	30 June 2022	14 August 2022	SHS
Tourism	Mangal Lodha	14 August 2022	14 July 2023	BJP
Tourism	Girish Mahajan	14 July 2023	26 November 2024	BJP
Protocol	Eknath Shinde; Chief Minister Additional Charge	30 June 2022	14 August 2022	SHS
Protocol	Devendra Fadnavis; Deputy Chief Minister	14 August 2022	26 November 2024	BJP
Medical Education	Eknath Shinde; Chief Minister Additional Charge	30 June 2022	14 August 2022	SHS
Medical Education	Girish Mahajan	14 August 2022	14 July 2023	BJP
Medical Education	Hasan Mushrif	14 July 2023	26 November 2024	NCP
Cultural Affairs	Eknath Shinde; Chief Minister Additional Charge	30 June 2022	14 August 2022	SHS
Cultural Affairs	Sudhir Mungantiwar	14 August 2022	26 November 2024	BJP
Higher and Technical Education	Eknath Shinde; Chief Minister Additional Charge	30 June 2022	14 August 2022	SHS
Higher and Technical Education	Chandrakant Patil	14 August 2022	26 November 2024	BJP
Food and Drug Administration	Eknath Shinde; Chief Minister Additional Charge	30 June 2022	14 August 2022	SHS
Food and Drug Administration	Sanjay Rathod	14 August 2022	14 July 2023	SHS
Food and Drug Administration	Dharamraobaba Bhagwantrao Aatram	14 July 2023	26 November 2024	NCP
School Education	Eknath Shinde; Chief Minister Additional Charge	30 June 2022	14 August 2022	SHS
School Education	Deepak Kesarkar	14 August 2022	26 November 2024	SHS
Employment Guarantee	Eknath Shinde; Chief Minister Additional Charge	30 June 2022	14 August 2022	SHS
Employment Guarantee	Sandipanrao Bhumre	14 August 2022	4 June 2024	SHS
Employment Guarantee	Eknath Shinde; Chief Minister Additional Charge	04 June 2024	16 August 2024	SHS
Employment Guarantee	Dadaji Bhuse	16 August 2024	26 November 2024	SHS
Horticulture	Eknath Shinde; Chief Minister Additional Charge	30 June 2022	14 August 2022	SHS
Horticulture	Sandipanrao Bhumre	14 August 2022	4 June 2024	SHS
Horticulture	Eknath Shinde; Chief Minister Additional Charge	04 June 2024	16 August 2024	SHS
Horticulture	Dadaji Bhuse	16 August 2024	26 November 2024	SHS
Co-operation	Eknath Shinde; Chief Minister Additional Charge	30 June 2022	14 August 2022	SHS
Co-operation	Atul Save	14 August 2022	14 July 2023	BJP
Co-operation	Dilip Walse-Patil	14 July 2023	26 November 2024	NCP
Marketing	Eknath Shinde; Chief Minister Additional Charge	30 June 2022	14 August 2022	SHS
Marketing	Eknath Shinde; Chief Minister	14 August 2022	14 July 2023	SHS
Marketing	Abdul Sattar	14 July 2023	Incumbent	SHS
Textiles	Eknath Shinde; Chief Minister Additional Charge	30 June 2022	14 August 2022	SHS
Textiles	Chandrakant Patil	14 August 2022	26 November 2024	BJP
Fisheries Department	Eknath Shinde; Chief Minister Additional Charge	30 June 2022	14 August 2022	SHS
Fisheries Department	Sudhir Mungantiwar	14 August 2022	26 November 2024	BJP
Ports Development	Eknath Shinde; Chief Minister Additional Charge	30 June 2022	14 August 2022	SHS
Ports Development	Dadaji Bhuse	14 August 2022	14 July 2023	SHS
Ports Development	Sanjay Bansode	14 July 2023	26 November 2024	NCP
Public Health and Family Welfare	Eknath Shinde; Chief Minister Additional Charge	30 June 2022	14 August 2022	SHS
Public Health and Family Welfare	Tanaji Sawant	14 August 2022	26 November 2024	SHS
Other Backward Classes	Eknath Shinde; Chief Minister Additional Charge	30 June 2022	14 August 2022	SHS
Other Backward Classes	Atul Save	14 August 2022	26 November 2024	BJP
Agriculture	Eknath Shinde; Chief Minister Additional Charge	30 June 2022	14 August 2022	SHS
Agriculture	Abdul Sattar	14 August 2022	14 July 2023	SHS
Agriculture	Dhananjay Munde	14 July 2023	26 November 2024	NCP
Other Backward Bahujan Welfare	Eknath Shinde; Chief Minister Additional Charge	30 June 2022	14 August 2022	SHS
Other Backward Bahujan Welfare	Atul Save	14 August 2022	26 November 2024	BJP
Ex. Servicemen Welfare	Eknath Shinde; Chief Minister Additional Charge	30 June 2022	14 August 2022	SHS
Ex. Servicemen Welfare	Eknath Shinde; Chief Minister	14 August 2022	26 November 2024	SHS
Socially and Educationally Backward Classes	Eknath Shinde; Chief Minister Additional Charge	30 June 2022	14 August 2022	SHS
Socially and Educationally Backward Classes	Atul Save	14 August 2022	26 November 2024	BJP
Socially and Educationally Backward Classes	Eknath Shinde; Chief Minister	14 July 2023	26 November 2024	SHS
Social Justice	Eknath Shinde; Chief Minister Additional Charge	30 June 2022	14 August 2022	SHS
Social Justice	Eknath Shinde; Chief Minister	14 August 2022	26 November 2024	SHS
Vimukta Jati	Eknath Shinde; Chief Minister Additional Charge	30 June 2022	14 August 2022	SHS
Vimukta Jati	Atul Save	14 August 2022	14 July 2023	BJP
Vimukta Jati	Eknath Shinde; Chief Minister	14 July 2023	26 November 2024	SHS
Special Assistance	Eknath Shinde; Chief Minister Additional Charge	30 June 2022	14 August 2022	SHS
Special Assistance	Eknath Shinde; Chief Minister	14 August 2022	26 November 2024	SHS
Special Assistance	Hasan Mushrif	14 July 2023	26 November 2024	NCP
Nomadic Tribes	Eknath Shinde; Chief Minister Additional Charge	30 June 2022	14 August 2022	SHS
Nomadic Tribes	Atul Save	14 August 2022	14 July 2023	BJP
Nomadic Tribes	Eknath Shinde; Chief Minister	14 July 2023	26 November 2024	SHS
Minority Development and Aukaf	Eknath Shinde; Chief Minister Additional Charge	30 June 2022	14 August 2022	SHS
Minority Development and Aukaf	Eknath Shinde; Chief Minister	14 August 2022	14 July 2023	SS
Minority Development and Aukaf	Abdul Sattar	14 July 2023	26 November 2024	SHS
Special Backward Classes Welfare	Eknath Shinde; Chief Minister Additional Charge	30 June 2022	14 August 2022	SHS
Special Backward Classes Welfare	Atul Save	14 August 2022	14 July 2023	BJP
Special Backward Classes Welfare	Eknath Shinde; Chief Minister	14 July 2023	26 November 2024	SHS
Animal Husbandry	Eknath Shinde; Chief Minister Additional Charge	30 June 2022	14 August 2022	SHS
Animal Husbandry	Radhakrishna Vikhe Patil	14 August 2022	26 November 2024	BJP
Khar Land Development	Eknath Shinde; Chief Minister Additional Charge	30 June 2022	14 August 2022	SHS
Khar Land Development	Eknath Shinde; Chief Minister	14 August 2022	26 November 2024	SHS
Dairy Development	Eknath Shinde; Chief Minister Additional Charge	30 June 2022	14 August 2022	SHS
Dairy Development	Radhakrishna Vikhe Patil	14 August 2022	26 November 2024	BJP
Earthquake Rehabilitation	Eknath Shinde; Chief Minister Additional Charge	30 June 2022	14 August 2022	SHS
Earthquake Rehabilitation	Eknath Shinde; Chief Minister	14 August 2022	26 November 2024	SHS
Sports and Youth Welfare	Eknath Shinde; Chief Minister Additional Charge	30 June 2022	14 August 2022	SHS
Sports and Youth Welfare	Girish Mahajan	14 August 2022	14 July 2023	BJP
Sports and Youth Welfare	Sanjay Bansode	14 July 2023	26 November 2024	NCP
Skill Development and Entrepreneurship	Eknath Shinde; Chief Minister Additional Charge	30 June 2022	14 August 2022	SHS
Skill Development and Entrepreneurship	Mangal Lodha	14 August 2022	26 November 2024	BJP
Disaster Management	Eknath Shinde; Chief Minister Additional Charge	30 June 2022	14 August 2022	SHS
Disaster Management	Eknath Shinde; Chief Minister	14 August 2022	14 July 2023	SHS
Disaster Management	Anil Bhaidas Patil	14 July 2023	26 November 2024	NCP
Relief & Rehabilitation	Eknath Shinde; Chief Minister Additional Charge	30 June 2022	14 August 2022	SHS
Relief & Rehabilitation	Eknath Shinde; Chief Minister	14 August 2022	14 July 2023	SHS
Relief & Rehabilitation	Anil Bhaidas Patil	14 July 2023	26 November 2024	NCP
Majority Welfare Development	Eknath Shinde; Chief Minister Additional Charge	30 June 2022	14 August 2022	SHS
Majority Welfare Development	Eknath Shinde; Chief Minister	14 August 2022	26 November 2024	SHS
Soil and Water Conservation	Eknath Shinde; Chief Minister Additional Charge	30 June 2022	14 August 2022	SHS
Soil and Water Conservation	Eknath Shinde; Chief Minister	14 August 2022	14 July 2023	SHS
Soil and Water Conservation	Sanjay Rathod	14 July 2023	26 November 2024	SS
Rural Development	Eknath Shinde; Chief Minister Additional Charge	30 June 2022	14 August 2022	SHS
Rural Development	Girish Mahajan	14 August 2022	26 November 2024	BJP
Labour	Eknath Shinde; Chief Minister Additional Charge	30 June 2022	14 August 2022	SHS
Labour	Suresh Khade	14 August 2022	26 November 2024	BJP
Disability Welfare	Eknath Shinde; Chief Minister Additional Charge	9 January 2023	26 November 2024	SHS
