= Ministry of Industries (Maharashtra) =

Ministry in Government of Maharashtra

Ministry of Industries Department Government of Maharashtra
- मंत्रालय उद्योग विभाग, महाराष्ट्र शासन
- Seal of the state of Maharashtra

- Building of Administrative Headquarters of Mumbai

Ministry overview
- Jurisdiction: Maharashtra
- Headquarters: Mantralay, Mumbai
- Minister responsible: Uday Samant, Cabinet Minister
- Deputy Minister responsible: Indranil Naik, Minister of State
- Parent department: Government of Maharashtra
- Child ministry: Directorate of Industries
- Website: industry.maharashtra.gov.in/en

The Ministry of industries is a ministry in Government of Maharashtra. Ministry is responsible for promotion of industries in Maharashtra.

The Ministry is headed by a cabinet level minister. Uday Samant is current Minister of Industries since 21 December 2024.

== Head office ==
Minister of Industries मंत्री उद्योग विभाग
- Emblem of India

- Flag of India

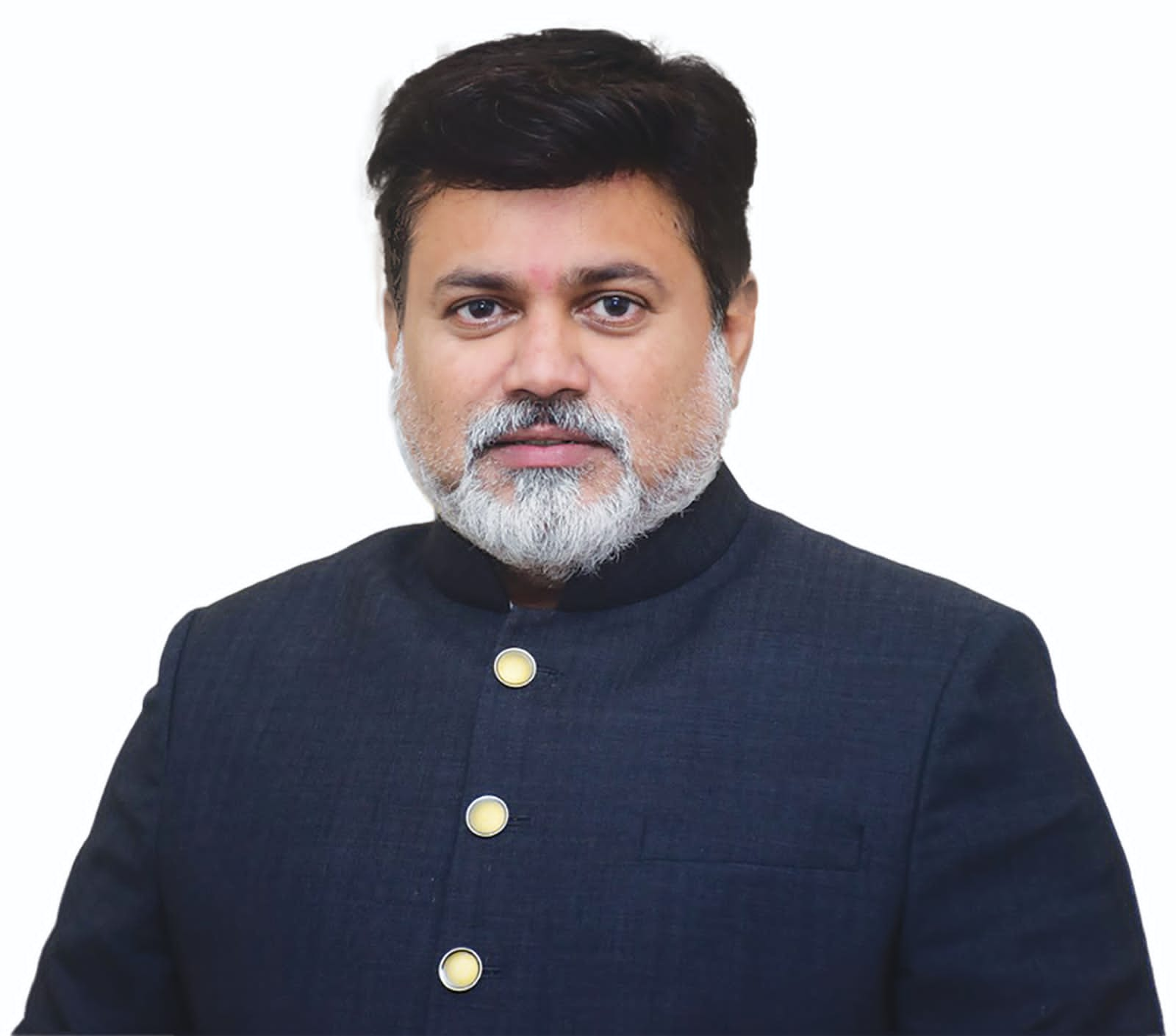
- Incumbent; Uday Samant since 21 December 2024
- Ministry of Industries (Maharashtra)
- Style: The Honourable
- Abbreviation: Cabinet Minister
- Member of: State Cabinet
- Reports to: Chief Minister, Maharashtra Legislature
- Seat: Mantralaya, Mumbai
- Appointer: Governor on the advice of the Chief Minister
- Term length: 5 years
- Precursor: Devendra Fadnavis; (2024–2024)
- Inaugural holder: S. K. Wankhede; (1960–1962)
- Formation: 1 May 1960
- Deputy: Indranil Naik

== Cabinet Ministers ==
No.	Portrait	Minister (Constituency)	Term of office			Political party	Ministry	Chief Minister
No.	Portrait	Minister (Constituency)	From	To	Period	Political party	Ministry	Chief Minister
Minister of Industries
01		Yashwantrao Chavan (MLA for Karad North Constituency No. 259- Satara District) (Legislative Assembly) (Chief Minister)	01 May 1960	07 March 1962	1 year, 310 days	Indian National Congress	Yashwantrao I	Yashwantrao Chavan
02		Sheshrao Krishnarao Wankhede (MLA for Sawargoan Constituency No. 49- Nagpur District) (Legislative Assembly)	08 March 1962	19 November 1962	256 days	Indian National Congress	Yashwantrao II	Yashwantrao Chavan
03		Sheshrao Krishnarao Wankhede (MLA for Sawargoan Constituency No. 49- Nagpur District) (Legislative Assembly)	20 November 1962	24 November 1963	1 year, 4 days	Indian National Congress	Kannamwar l	Marotrao Kannamwar
04		Parashuram Krishnaji Sawant (MLA for Chiplun Constituency No. 265- Ratnagiri District) (Legislative Assembly) (Interim Chief Minister)	25 November 1962	04 December 1963	9 days	Indian National Congress	Sawant	Parashuram Krishnaji Sawant
05		Sadashiv Govind Barve (MLA for Shivajinagar Constituency No. 209- Pune District) (Legislative Assembly)	05 December 1963	01 March 1967	3 years, 86 days	Indian National Congress	Vasantrao I	Vasantrao Naik
06		Shankarrao Chavan (MLA for Bhokar Constituency No. 85- Nanded District) (Legislative Assembly)	01 March 1967	27 October 1969	2 years, 240 days	Indian National Congress	Vasantrao II	Vasantrao Naik
07		Sheshrao Krishnarao Wankhede (MLA for Sawargoan Constituency No. 49- Nagpur District) (Legislative Assembly)	27 October 1969	13 March 1972	2 years, 138 days	Indian National Congress	Vasantrao II	Vasantrao Naik
08		Abdul Rahman Antulay (MLA for Shrivardhan Constituency No. 193- Raigad District) (Legislative Assembly)	13 March 1972	04 April 1973	1 year, 32 days	Indian National Congress	Vasantrao III	Vasantrao Naik
09		Yashwantrao Mohite (MLA for Karad South Constituency No. 260- Satara District) (Legislative Assembly)	04 April 1973	17 Match; 1974	347 days	Indian National Congress	Vasantrao III	Vasantrao Naik
10		Vasantrao Patil (MLC for Elected by MLAs Constituency No. 20 - Sangli District) (Legislative Council)	17 Match; 1974	21 February 1975	341 days	Indian National Congress	Vasantrao III	Vasantrao Naik
11		Narendra Mahipati Tidke (MLA for Savner Constituency No. 49- Nagpur District) (Legislative Assembly)	21 February 1975	16 April 1977	2 years, 54 days	Indian National Congress	Shankarrao I	Shankarrao Chavan
12		Sheshrao Krishnarao Wankhede (MLA for Sawargoan Constituency No. 49- Nagpur District) (Legislative Assembly)	17 April 1977	07 March 1978	1 year, 324 days	Indian National Congress	Vasantdada I	Vasantdada Patil
13		Sharad Pawar (MLA for Baramati Constituency No. 201- Pune District) (Legislative Assembly)	07 March 1978	18 July 1978	133 days	Indian National Congress (Indira)	Vasantdada II	Vasantdada Patil
14		Shankarrao Chavan (MLA for Bhokar Constituency No. 85- Nanded District) (Legislative Assembly)	18 July 1978	19 November 1979	1 year, 124 days	Indian Congress (Socialist)	Pawar I	Sharad Pawar
15		Jawaharlal Darda (MLC for Elected by MLAs Constituency No. 19 - Yavatmal District) (Legislative Council)	09 June 1980	21 January 1982	1 year, 226 days	Indian National Congress	Antulay	Abdul Rahman Antulay
16		Narendra Marutrao Kamble (MLC for Elected by Governor Nominated No. 10 - Mumbai City District) (Legislative Council)	21 January 1982	02 February 1983	1 year, 12 days	Indian National Congress	Bhosale	Babasaheb Bhosale
17		Ramrao Adik (MLC for Elected by MLAs Constituency No. 05 - Ahmednagar District) (Legislative Council) (Deputy Chief Minister)	07 February 1983	05 March 1985	2 years, 26 days	Indian National Congress	Vasantdada III	Vasantdada Patil
18		Sudhakarrao Naik (MLA for Pusad Constituency No. 81- Yavatmal District) (Legislative Assembly)	12 March 1985	03 June 1985	83 days	Indian National Congress	Vasantdada IV	Vasantdada Patil
19		Sudhakarrao Naik (MLA for Pusad Constituency No. 81- Yavatmal District) (Legislative Assembly)	03 June 1985	12 March 1986	282 days	Indian National Congress	Nilangekar	Shivajirao Patil Nilangekar
20		Sushilkumar Shinde (MLA for Solapur City Central Constituency No. 249- Solapur District) (Legislative Assembly)	12 March 1986	23 May 1987	1 year, 34 days	Indian National Congress	Shankarrao II	Shankarrao Chavan
21		Balachandra Bhai Sawant (MLC for Elected by MLAs Constituency No. 09 - Ratnagiri District) (Legislative Council)	23 May 1987	26 June 1988	1 year, 34 days	Indian National Congress	Shankarrao II	Shankarrao Chavan
22		Ramrao Adik (MLC for Elected by MLAs Constituency No. 05 - Ahmednagar District) (Legislative Council)	26 June 1988	03 March 1990	1 year, 250 days	Indian National Congress	Pawar II	Sharad Pawar
23		Bharat Bondre (MLA for Chikhali Constituency No. 23- Buldhana District) (Legislative Assembly)	03 March 1990	25 June 1991	1 year, 114 days	Indian National Congress	Pawar III	Sharad Pawar
24		Vilasrao Deshmukh (MLA for Latur City Constituency No. 235- Latur District) (Legislative Assembly)	25 June 1991	22 February 1993	1 year, 242 days	Indian National Congress	Sudhakarrao	Sudhakarrao Naik
25		Jawaharlal Darda (MLC for Elected by MLAs Constituency No. 19 - Yavatmal District) (Legislative Council)	06 March 1993	18 November 1994	1 year, 257 days	Indian National Congress	Pawar IV	Sharad Pawar
26		Liladhar Dake (MLA for Bhandup Constituency No. 168- Mumbai Suburban District) (Legislative Assembly)	14 March 1995	01 February 1999	3 years, 324 days	Shiv Sena	Joshi	Manohar Joshi
27		Narayan Rane (MLA for Malvan Constituency No. 269- Sindhudurg District) (Legislative Assembly) (Chief Minister)	01 February 1999	11 May 1999	99 days	Shiv Sena	Rane	Narayan Rane
28		Nitin Gadkari (MLC for Nagpur Graduates Constituency No. 03 - Nagpur District) (Legislative Council)	11 May 1999	17 October 1999	159 days	Bharatiya Janata Party	Rane	Narayan Rane
29		Patangrao Kadam (MLA for Palus-Kadegaon Constituency No. 285- Sangli District) (Legislative Assembly)	19 October 1999	16 January 2003	3 years, 89 days	Indian National Congress	Deshmukh I	Vilasrao Deshmukh
30		Ashok Chavan (MLA for Mudkhed Constituency No. 85- Nanded District) (Legislative Assembly)	18 January 2003	01 November 2004	1 year, 295 days	Indian National Congress	Sushilkumar	Sushilkumar Shinde
31		Vilasrao Deshmukh (MLA for Latur City Constituency No. 235- Latur District) (Legislative Assembly) (Chief Minister)	01 November 2004	09 November 2004	8 days	Indian National Congress	Deshmukh II	Vilasrao Deshmukh
32		Ashok Chavan (MLA for Mudkhed Constituency No. 85- Nanded District) (Legislative Assembly)	09 November 2004	01 December 2008	4 years, 22 days	Indian National Congress	Deshmukh II	Vilasrao Deshmukh
33		Ashok Chavan (MLA for Bhokar Constituency No. 85- Nanded District) (Legislative Assembly) (Chief Minister)	08 December 2008	06 November 2009	333 days	Indian National Congress	Ashok I	Ashok Chavan
34		Rajendra Darda (MLA for Aurangabad East Constituency No. 109- Chhatrapati Sambhaji Nagar District Also Previously Known Aurangabad District (Legislative Assembly)	07 November 2009	10 November 2010	1 year, 3 days	Indian National Congress	Ashok II	Ashok Chavan
35		Narayan Rane (MLC for Elected by MLAs Constituency No. 03 - Sindhudurg District) (Legislative Council)	11 November 2010	26 September 2014	3 years, 319 days	Indian National Congress	Prithviraj	Prithviraj Chavan
36		Prakash Mehta (MLA for Ghatkopar East Constituency No. 170- Mumbai Suburban District (Legislative Assembly)	31 October 2014	05 December 2014	35 days	Bharatiya Janata Party	Fadnavis I	Devendra Fadnavis
37		Subhash Desai (MLC for Elected by MLAs Constituency No. 09 - Mumbai Suburban District) (Legislative Council)	05 December 2014	12 November 2019	4 years, 342 days	Shiv Sena	Fadnavis I	Devendra Fadnavis
38		Devendra Fadnavis (MLA for Nagpur South West Constituency No. 52- Nagpur District) (Legislative Assembly) (Chief_Minister); In Charge	23 November 2019	28 November 2019	5 days	Bharatiya Janata Party	Fadnavis II	Devendra Fadnavis
39		Subhash Desai (MLC for Elected by MLAs Constituency No. 09 - Mumbai Suburban District) (Legislative Council)	28 November 2019	30 December 2019	32 days	Shiv Sena	Thackeray	Uddhav Thackeray
40		Subhash Desai (MLC for Elected by MLAs Constituency No. 09 - Mumbai Suburban District) (Legislative Council)	30 December 2019	29 June 2022	2 years, 181 days	Shiv Sena	Thackeray	Uddhav Thackeray
41		Eknath Shinde (MLA for Kopri-Pachpakhadi Constituency No. 147- Thane District) (Legislative Assembly) (Chief Minister); In Charge	30 June 2022	14 August 2022	45 days	Shiv Sena (Shinde Group)	Eknath	Eknath Shinde
42		Uday Samant (MLA for Ratnagiri Constituency No. 266- Ratnagiri District (Legislative Assembly)	14 August 2022	26 November 2024	2 years, 135 days	Shiv Sena (2022–present)	Eknath	Eknath Shinde
43		Devendra Fadnavis (MLA for Nagpur South West Constituency No. 52- Nagpur District) (Legislative Assembly) (Chief_Minister); In Charge	05 December 2024	21 December 2024	16 days	Bharatiya Janata Party	Fadnavis III	Devendra Fadnavis
44		Uday Samant (MLA for Ratnagiri Constituency No. 266- Ratnagiri District (Legislative Assembly)	21 December 2024	Incumbent	1 year, 261 days	Shiv Sena (2022–present)	Fadnavis III	Devendra Fadnavis

== Ministers of State ==
No.	Portrait	Deputy Minister (Constituency)	Term of office			Political party	Ministry	Minister	Chief Minister
No.	Portrait	Deputy Minister (Constituency)	From	To	Period	Political party	Ministry	Minister	Chief Minister
Deputy Minister of Industries
Vacant			23 November 2019	28 November 2019	5 days	NA	Fadnavis II	Devendra Fadnavis	Devendra Fadnavis
01		Aditi Tatkare (MLA for Shrivardhan Constituency No. 193- Raigad District) (Legislative Assembly)	30 December 2019	29 June 2022	2 years, 181 days	Nationalist Congress Party	Thackeray	Subhash Desai	Uddhav Thackeray
Vacant			30 June 2022	26 November 2024	2 years, 149 days	NA	Eknath	Eknath Shinde (2022 - 2022); Uday Samant (2022–2024)	Eknath Shinde
02		Indranil Naik (MLA for Pusad Constituency No. 81- Yavatmal District) (Legislative Assembly)	21 December 2024	Incumbent	1 year, 261 days	Nationalist Congress Party (Ajit Pawar Group)	Fadnavis III	Uday Samant (2024 – Present)	Devendra Fadnavis

== Overview ==
Ministry of Industries is one of the main ministries in the Maharashtra Government. Mumbai is the state capital of Maharashtra. Mumbai is also the financial, commercial, and the entertainment capital of India. It is also one of the world's top ten centres of commerce in terms of global financial flow, generating 6.16% of India's GDP, and accounting for 25% of industrial output, 70% of maritime trade in India (Mumbai Port Trust and JNPT), and 70% of capital transactions to India's economy. The Maharashtra state houses important financial institutions and the corporate headquarters of numerous Indian companies and multinational corporations.

== Departments ==
Directorate of Industries is an executive arm of the Ministry and is responsible for implementation of government policies for development of industries in Maharashtra.
