= Uday Samant =

Indian politician

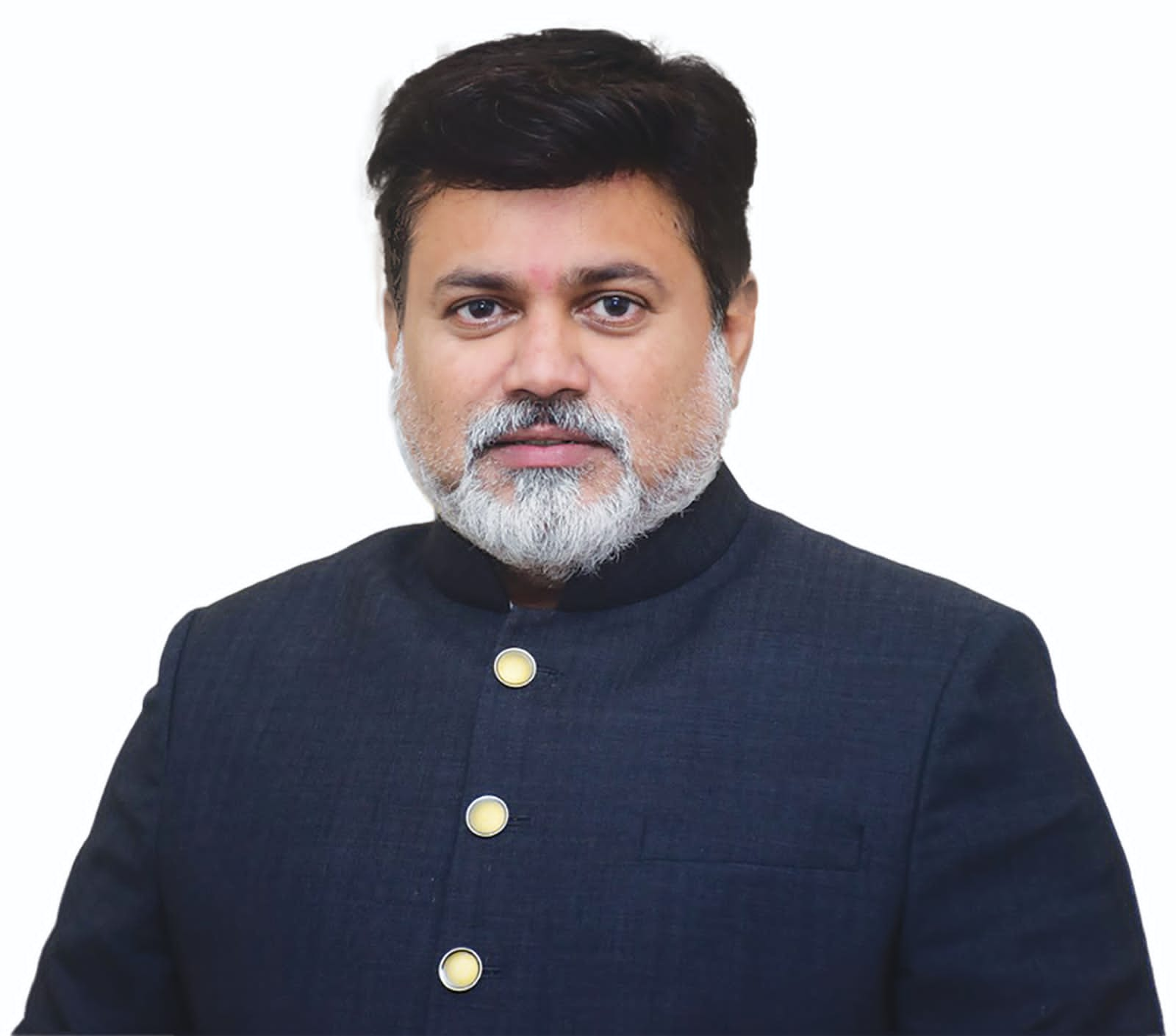

Cabinet Minister Government of Maharashtra
- Incumbent
- Assumed office 15 December 2024
- Minister: Industries; Marathi Language
- Governor: C. P. Radhakrishnan; Acharya Devvrat additional charge
- Cabinet: Third Fadnavis ministry
- Chief Minister: Devendra Fadnavis
- Deputy CM: Eknath Shinde; Ajit Pawar (till his demise in 2026) Sunetra Pawar (from 2026)
- Guardian Minister: Ratnagiri district

Cabinet Minister Government of Maharashtra
- In office 14 August 2022 – 26 November 2024
- Minister: Industries
- Governor: Bhagat Singh Koshyari; Ramesh Bais; C. P. Radhakrishnan
- Chief Minister: Eknath Shinde
- Deputy CM: Devendra Fadnavis
- Guardian Minister: Raigad District; Ratnagiri District
- Preceded by: Subhash Desai (Industries Ministry); Aditi Sunil Tatkare (Raigad District); Anil Parab (Ratnagiri District)

Deputy Leader of the House Maharashtra Legislative Council
- Acting
- In office 17 August 2022 – 26 November 2024
- Governor: Bhagat Singh Koshyari; Ramesh Bais
- Chairman: Neelam Gorhe Acting
- Chief Minister: Eknath Shinde
- Leader of the House: Devendra Fadnavis
- Preceded by: Subhash Desai
- Succeeded by: Pankaja Munde

Cabinet Minister Government of Maharashtra
- In office 30 December 2019 – 27 June 2022
- Minister: Higher and Technical Education Ministry
- Governor: Bhagat Singh Koshyari
- Chief Minister: Uddhav Thackeray
- Deputy CM: Ajit Pawar
- Guardian Minister: Sindhudurg District
- Preceded by: Vinod Tawde (Higher and Technical Education Ministry); Tanaji Sawant (Sindhudurg District)
- Succeeded by: Aaditya Thackeray (Higher and Technical Education Ministry); Anil Parab; Additional Charge (Sindhudurg District)

Chairman of Maharashtra Housing and Area Development Authority (MHADA)
- In office 2018–2020
- Preceded by: Bal Mane

Member of the Maharashtra Legislative Assembly
- Incumbent
- Assumed office (2004-2009), (2009-2014), (2014-2019), (2019-2024), (2024-Present)
- Preceded by: Bal Mane
- Constituency: Ratnagiri

Minister of State for Urban Development of Maharashtra
- In office June 2013 – September 2014

Personal details
- Citizenship: India
- Party: Shiv Sena
- Other political affiliations: Nationalist Congress Party; Balasahebanchi Shiv Sena
- Education: Diploma in Engineering
- Alma mater: Dnyaneshwar University Pune
- Occupation: Politician

Uday Samant is an Indian politician and leader of Shiv Sena from Maharashtra. He is Cabinet Minister of Ministry of Industries (Maharashtra). He is current Member of Legislative Assembly from Ratnagiri. He has been elected to Vidhan Sabha for five consecutive terms in 2004, 2009, 2014, 2019 and 2024.

== Early life ==
Samant was born in Ratnagiri region of Maharashtra.

== Positions held ==
- 2004: Elected to Maharashtra Legislative Assembly (1st term)
- 2009: Re-Elected to Maharashtra Legislative Assembly (2nd term)
- 2013 - 2014: Minister of State for Urban Development in Maharashtra Government
- 2013 - 2014: Guardian Minister of Ratnagiri district
- 2014: Re-Elected to Maharashtra Legislative Assembly (3rd term)
- 2017 : Appointed Samparkh pramukh of Pune City
- 2018 : Appointed Deputy Leader of Shiv Sena Party
- 2018 : Appointed chairman of Maharashtra Housing and Area Development Authority (Mhada)
- 2019: Re-elected to Maharashtra Legislative Assembly (4th term)
- 2019: Appointed minister of Higher and Technical Education
- 2020: Appointed guardian minister of Sindhudurg district
- 2022: Took oath as cabinet minister in Eknath Shinde ministry.
  - 14 August 2022: Appointed Minister for Ministry of Industries (Maharashtra).
- 2024: Re-elected to Maharashtra Legislative Assembly (5th term)
  - 21 December 2024: Appointed Minister for Industries and Marathi language.

== See also ==
- Eknath Shinde ministry
- Uddhav Thackeray ministry
- Ratnagiri–Sindhudurg Lok Sabha constituency
- Raigad Lok Sabha constituency
