= Deepak Vasant Kesarkar =

Indian politician

Deepak Kesarkar

Cabinet Minister Government of Maharashtra
- In office 14 August 2022 – 26 November 2024
- Minister: School Education; Marathi Language
- Governor: Bhagat Singh Koshyari; Ramesh Bais; C. P. Radhakrishnan
- Chief Minister: Eknath Shinde
- Deputy CM: Devendra Fadnavis; Ajit Pawar
- Guardian Minister: Mumbai City District
- Preceded by: Varsha Gaikwad (School Education Ministry); Subhash Desai (Marathi Language Ministry); Satej Patil (Kolhapur District); Aslam Shaikh (Mumbai City District)

Minister of State for Home (Rural), Finance and Planning Government of Maharashtra
- In office 9 July 2016 – 2019

Minister of State for Finance, Rural Development Government of Maharashtra
- In office 5 December 2014 – 9 July 2016

Member of Legislative Assembly of the Maharashtra
- Incumbent
- Assumed office 2009
- Constituency: Sawantwadi

Personal details
- Born: 17 July 1955 (age 71) Sawantwadi
- Party: Shiv Sena (2022-present)
- Education: B.Com., Shree Pancham Khemraj Mahavidyalay, Sawantwadi, Mumbai University, 1975
- Occupation: Politician
- Website: deepakkesarkar.net

Deepak Vasant Kesarkar is a member of the 14th Maharashtra Legislative Assembly. He is a former Cabinet Minister for Ministry of Education and Ministry of Marathi Language. He represents the Sawantwadi Assembly Constituency. He belongs to the Shiv Sena. He was appointed Maharashtra's minister of state for Finance, and Rural Development in December 2014. He was also guardian minister of Sindhudurg district.

== Positions held ==
- 2009: Elected to Maharashtra Legislative Assembly (1st term)
- 2014: Re-Elected to Maharashtra Legislative Assembly (2nd term)
- 2014: Minister of State for Finance, Rural Development in Maharashtra State Government
- 2014: Guardian minister of Sindhudurg district
- 2016: Minister of State for Home (Rural), Finance and Planning in Maharashtra State Government
- 2019: Elected to Maharashtra Legislative Assembly
- 2022: Minister for Ministry of School Education (Maharashtra) and Ministry of Marathi Language.

== See also ==
- Devendra Fadnavis ministry

Political offices
| Preceded by | Minister of State for Home (Rural), Finance and Planning; Maharashtra State; July 2016–present | Incumbent |
| Preceded by | Minister of State for Finance and Rural Development; Maharashtra State; December 2014–July 2016 | Succeeded by Dadaji Bhuse |
| Preceded by | Maharashtra State Guardian Minister for Sindhudurg district December 2014–present | Incumbent |
