= Ministry of Higher and Technical Education (Maharashtra) =

Government ministry in Maharashtra, India

Ministry of Higher and Technical Education, Government of Maharashtra
- मंत्रालय उच्च व तंत्र शिक्षण विभाग, महाराष्ट्र शासन
- Seal of the state of Maharashtra

Ministry overview
- Formed: 1992; 34 years ago
- Jurisdiction: (India) Maharashtra
- Headquarters: Mantralay, Mumbai
- Minister responsible: Chandrakant Patil, Cabinet Minister
- Deputy Minister responsible: Indranil Naik, Minister of State
- Ministry executive: Mr. Vikas Rastogi, IAS)
- Parent department: Government of Maharashtra
- Website: htedu.maharashtra.gov.in

The Ministry of Higher and Technical Education is a ministry of the Government of Maharashtra. It is responsible for designing and implementing higher and technical education related policies in the state Maharashtra

The Ministry is headed by a cabinet level minister. Chandrakant Patil is current Minister of Higher and Technical.

== Cabinet Ministers ==
No.	Portrait	Minister (Constituency)	Term of office			Political party	Ministry	Chief Minister
No.	Portrait	Minister (Constituency)	From	To	Period	Political party	Ministry	Chief Minister
Minister of Higher and Technical Education
01		Balasaheb Desai (MLA for Patan Constituency No. 261- Satara District) (Legislative Assembly)	01 May 1960	07 March 1962	1 year, 310 days	Indian National Congress	Yashwantrao I	Yashwantrao Chavan
02		Madhukar Dhanaji Chaudhari (MLA for Raver Constituency No. 11- Jalgaon District) (Legislative Assembly)	08 March 1962	19 November 1962	256 days	Indian National Congress	Yashwantrao II	Yashwantrao Chavan
03		Balasaheb Desai (MLA for Patan Constituency No. 261- Satara District) (Legislative Assembly)	20 November 1962	24 November 1963	1 year, 4 days	Indian National Congress	Kannamwar l	Marotrao Kannamwar
04		Parashuram Krishnaji Sawant (MLA for Chiplun Constituency No. 265- Ratnagiri District) (Legislative Assembly) (Interim Chief Minister)	25 November 1962	04 December 1963	9 days	Indian National Congress	Sawant	Parashuram Krishnaji Sawant
05		Madhukar Dhanaji Chaudhari (MLA for Raver Constituency No. 11- Jalgaon District) (Legislative Assembly)	05 December 1963	01 March 1967	3 years, 86 days	Indian National Congress	Vasantrao I	Vasantrao Naik
06		D. S. Palaspagar (MLC for Elected by MLAs Constituency No. 19 - Bhandara District) (Legislative Council)	01 March 1967	27 October 1969	2 years, 240 days	Indian National Congress	Vasantrao II	Vasantrao Naik
07		Sheshrao Krishnarao Wankhede (MLA for Sawargoan Constituency No. 49- Nagpur District) (Legislative Assembly)	27 October 1969	13 March 1972	2 years, 138 days	Indian National Congress	Vasantrao II	Vasantrao Naik
08		Pratibha Patil (MLA for Jalgaon City Constituency No. 13- Jalgaon District) (Legislative Assembly)	13 March 1972	04 April 1973	1 year, 32 days	Indian National Congress	Vasantrao III	Vasantrao Naik
09		Abdul Rahman Antulay (MLA for Shrivardhan Constituency No. 193- Raigad District) (Legislative Assembly)	04 April 1973	17 Match; 1974	347 days	Indian National Congress	Vasantrao III	Vasantrao Naik
10		Vasantrao Patil (MLC for Elected by MLAs Constituency No. 20 - Sangli District) (Legislative Council)	17 Match; 1974	21 February 1975	341 days	Indian National Congress	Vasantrao III	Vasantrao Naik
11		Pratibha Patil (MLA for Jalgaon City Constituency No. 13- Jalgaon District) (Legislative Assembly)	21 February 1975	16 April 1977	2 years, 54 days	Indian National Congress	Shankarrao I	Shankarrao Chavan
12		Vasant Hoshing (MLA for Byculla Constituency No. 184- Mumbai City District (Legislative Assembly)	17 April 1977	07 March 1978	1 year, 324 days	Indian National Congress	Vasantdada I	Vasantdada Patil
13		Purushottam Dekate (MLA for Umred Constituency No. 51- Nagpur District (Legislative Assembly)	07 March 1978	18 July 1978	133 days	Indian National Congress (Indira)	Vasantdada II	Vasantdada Patil
14		Nihal Ahmed Maulavi Mohammed Usman (MLA for Malegaon Central Constituency No. 114- Nashik District) (Legislative Assembly)	18 July 1978	18 February 1980	1 year, 215 days	Janata Party	Pawar I	Sharad Pawar
15		Shivajirao Patil Nilangekar (MLA for Nilanga Constituency No. 238- Latur District) (Legislative Assembly)	09 June 1980	21 January 1982	1 year, 226 days	Indian National Congress	Antulay	Abdul Rahman Antulay
16		Sharadchandrika Suresh Patil (Minister of Technical Education) (MLA for Chopda Constituency No. 10- Jalgaon District) (Legislative Assembly)	21 January 1982	02 February 1983	1 year, 12 days	Indian National Congress	Bhosale	Babasaheb Bhosale
17		Baburao Kale (Minister of Higher Education) (MLA for Ghansavangi Jalna Constituency No. 190- Jalna District) (Legislative Assembly)	21 January 1982	02 February 1983	1 year, 12 days	Indian National Congress	Bhosale	Babasaheb Bhosale
18		Sudhakarrao Naik (MLA for Pusad Constituency No. 81- Yavatmal District) (Legislative Assembly)	07 February 1983	05 March 1985	2 years, 26 days	Indian National Congress	Vasantdada III	Vasantdada Patil
19		Balachandra Bhai Sawant (MLC for Elected by MLAs Constituency No. 09 - Ratnagiri District) (Legislative Council)	12 March 1985	03 June 1985	83 days	Indian National Congress	Vasantdada IV	Vasantdada Patil
20		Ram Meghe (MLA for Daryapur Constituency No. 40- Amravati District) (Legislative Assembly)	03 June 1985	12 March 1986	282 days	Indian National Congress	Nilangekar	Shivajirao Patil Nilangekar
21		Ram Meghe (MLA for Daryapur Constituency No. 40- Amravati District) (Legislative Assembly)	12 March 1986	26 June 1988	2 years, 106 days	Indian National Congress	Shankarrao II	Shankarrao Chavan
22		Kamalkishor Kadam (MLA for Nanded Constituency No. 66- Nanded District (Legislative Assembly)	26 June 1988	03 March 1990	1 year, 250 days	Indian National Congress	Pawar II	Sharad Pawar
23		Vilasrao Deshmukh (MLA for Latur City Constituency No. 235- Latur District) (Legislative Assembly)	03 March 1990	25 June 1991	1 year, 114 days	Indian National Congress	Pawar III	Sharad Pawar
24		Anantrao Thopate (MLA for Bhor Constituency No. 203- Pune District (Legislative Assembly)	25 June 1991	22 February 1993	1 year, 242 days	Indian National Congress	Sudhakarrao	Sudhakarrao Naik
25		Prabhakar Dharkar (MLC for Elected by MLAs Constituency No. 16 - Pune District) (Legislative Council)	06 March 1993	18 November 1994	1 year, 257 days	Indian National Congress	Pawar IV	Sharad Pawar
26		Prakash Mehta (MLA for Ghatkopar East Constituency No. 170- Mumbai Suburban District (Legislative Assembly)	14 March 1995	01 February 1999	3 years, 324 days	Bharatiya Janata Party	Joshi	Manohar Joshi
27		Sureshdada Jain (MLA for Jalgaon City Constituency No. 13- Jalgaon District (Legislative Assembly)	01 February 1999	11 May 1999	99 days	Shiv Sena	Rane	Narayan Rane
28		Prakash Mehta (MLA for Ghatkopar East Constituency No. 170- Mumbai Suburban District (Legislative Assembly)	11 May 1999	17 October 1999	159 days	Bharatiya Janata Party	Rane	Narayan Rane
29		Vilasrao Deshmukh (MLA for Latur City Constituency No. 235- Latur District) (Legislative Assembly) (Chief Minister)	19 October 1999	27 October 1999	8 days	Indian National Congress	Deshmukh I	Vilasrao Deshmukh
30		Dilip Walse-Patil (MLA for Ambegaon Constituency No. 196- Pune District) (Legislative Assembly)	27 October 1999	16 January 2003	3 years, 81 days	Nationalist Congress Party	Deshmukh I	Vilasrao Deshmukh
31		Ramkrishna More (MLA for Khed Constituency No. 219- Pune District) (Legislative Assembly)	18 January 2003	01 November 2004	1 year, 295 days	Indian National Congress	Sushilkumar	Sushilkumar Shinde
32		R. R. Patil (MLA for Tasgaon-Kavathe Mahankal Constituency No. 287- Sangli District) (Legislative Assembly) (Deputy Chief Minister)	01 November 2004	09 November 2004	8 days	Nationalist Congress Party	Deshmukh II	Vilasrao Deshmukh
33		Sureshdada Jain (MLA for Jalgaon City Constituency No. 13- Jalgaon District (Legislative Assembly)	09 November 2004	01 December 2008	4 years, 22 days	Nationalist Congress Party	Deshmukh II	Vilasrao Deshmukh
34		Rajesh Tope (MLA for Ghansawangi Constituency No. 100- Jalna District (Legislative Assembly)	08 December 2008	06 November 2009	333 days	Nationalist Congress Party	Ashok I	Ashok Chavan
35		Rajesh Tope (MLA for Ghansawangi Constituency No. 100- Jalna District (Legislative Assembly)	07 November 2009	10 November 2010	1 year, 3 days	Nationalist Congress Party	Ashok II	Ashok Chavan
36		Rajesh Tope (MLA for Ghansawangi Constituency No. 100- Jalna District (Legislative Assembly)	11 November 2010	26 September 2014	3 years, 319 days	Indian National Congress	Prithviraj	Prithviraj Chavan
37		Vinod Tawde (MLA for Borivali Constituency No. 152- Mumbai Suburban District (Legislative Assembly)	31 October 2014	12 November 2019	5 years, 12 days	Bharatiya Janata Party	Fadnavis I	Devendra Fadnavis
38		Devendra Fadnavis (MLA for Nagpur South West Constituency No. 52- Nagpur District) (Legislative Assembly) (Chief_Minister); In Charge	23 November 2019	28 November 2019	5 days	Bharatiya Janata Party	Fadnavis II	Devendra Fadnavis
39		Subhash Desai (MLC for Elected by MLAs Constituency No. 09 - Mumbai Suburban District) (Legislative Council)	28 November 2019	30 December 2019	32 days	Shiv Sena	Thackeray	Uddhav Thackeray
40		Uday Samant (MLA for Ratnagiri Constituency No. 266- Ratnagiri District (Legislative Assembly)	30 December 2019	27 June 2022	2 years, 179 days	Shiv Sena	Thackeray	Uddhav Thackeray
41		Aaditya Thackeray (MLA for Worli Constituency No. 182- Mumbai City District (Legislative Assembly)	27 June 2022	29 June 2022	2 days	Shiv Sena (2022–present)	Thackeray	Uddhav Thackeray
42		Eknath Shinde (MLA for Kopri-Pachpakhadi Constituency No. 147- Thane District) (Legislative Assembly) (Chief Minister); In Charge	30 June 2022	14 August 2022	45 days	Shiv Sena (2022–present)	Eknath	Eknath Shinde
43		Chandrakant Patil (MLA for Kothrud Constituency No. 210- Pune District) (Legislative Assembly)	14 August 2022	26 November 2024	2 years, 135 days	Bharatiya Janata Party	Eknath	Eknath Shinde
44		Devendra Fadnavis (MLA for Nagpur South West Constituency No. 52- Nagpur District) (Legislative Assembly) (Chief_Minister); In Charge	05 December 2024	21 December 2024	16 days	Bharatiya Janata Party	Fadnavis III	Devendra Fadnavis
45		Chandrakant Patil (MLA for Kothrud Constituency No. 210- Pune District) (Legislative Assembly)	21 December 2024	Incumbent	1 year, 294 days	Bharatiya Janata Party	Fadnavis III	Devendra Fadnavis

== Ministers of State ==
No.	Portrait	Deputy Minister (Constituency)	Term of office			Political party	Ministry	Minister	Chief Minister
No.	Portrait	Deputy Minister (Constituency)	From	To	Period	Political party	Ministry	Minister	Chief Minister
Deputy Minister of Higher and Technical Education
The Post of Deputy Minister / Minister of States has been kept Vacant from 23 November 2019 To 28 November 2019			23 November 2019	28 November 2019	5 days	NA	Fadnavis II	Devendra Fadnavis	Devendra Fadnavis
01		Prajakt Tanpure (MLA for Rahuri Constituency No. 223- Ahmednagar District) (Legislative Assembly)	30 December 2019	30 June 2022	2 years, 181 days	Nationalist Congress Party	Thackeray	Uday Samant (2019 - 2022); Aaditya Thackeray (2022 - 2022)	Uddhav Thackeray
The Post of Deputy Minister / Minister of States has been kept Vacant from 30 June 2022			30 June 2022	26 November 2024	2 years, 149 days	NA	Eknath	Eknath Shinde (2022 - 2022); Chandrakant Patil (2022–2024)	Eknath Shinde
02		Indranil Naik (MLA for Pusad Constituency No. 81- Yavatmal District) (Legislative Assembly)	21 December 2024	Incumbent	1 year, 294 days	Nationalist Congress Party (Ajit Pawar Group)	Fadnavis III	Chandrakant Patil (2024–present)	Devendra Fadnavis

== History ==
Education and employment ministries were separated in 1992 and as a result, a separate ministry was established for higher and technical education.

== Departments ==
- Higher Education
- Technical Education
1. Art Education
- University Section
- National Service Scheme

=== Autonomous bodies ===
- Admission Regulating Authority (ARA)
- Maharashtra State Board of Technical Education
- Rashtriy Ucchatar Shiksha Abhiyan
- Fee Regulatory Authority
