= Indranil Naik =

Indian politician

Indranil Manohar Naik

Minister of State Government of Maharashtra
- Incumbent
- Assumed office 15 December 2024
- Governor: C. P. Radhakrishnan; Acharya Devvrat additional charge
- Cabinet: Third Fadnavis ministry
- Chief Minister: Devendra Fadnavis
- Deputy CM: Eknath Shinde; Ajit Pawar (till his demise in 2026) Sunetra Pawar (from 2026)
- Guardian Minister: Tribal Development; Soil and Water Conservation; Tourism; Higher and Technical Education; Industries; Public Works

Member of the Maharashtra Legislative Assembly
- Incumbent
- Assumed office (2019-2024), (2024-Present)
- Preceded by: Manohar Naik
- Constituency: Pusad

Personal details
- Born: 28 January 1982 (age 44) Pusad Dist., Yavatmal District
- Party: Nationalist Congress Party
- Other political affiliations: Nationalist Congress Party
- Spouse: Mohini Naik
- Parents: Manohar Naik (father); Anita Naik (mother)
- Education: Post Graduate & BSL., LLB From Shri Shivaji Law College, Kandhar, in 2017
- Occupation: Politician, Agriculturist and Social Worker

Indranil Manohar Naik (born 28 January 1982) is a leader of Nationalist Congress Party and a member of the Maharashtra Legislative Assembly elected from Pusad Assembly constituency. He is nephew of former chief minister of Maharashtra Sudhakarrao Naik and he is grandson of former chief minister of Maharashtra Vasantrao Naik.

== Career ==
Naik became an MLA for the first time winning the 2019 Maharashtra Legislative Assembly election. He retained the seat in the 2024 Maharashtra Legislative Assembly election.

He is also the president of the Yavatmal District Football Association.
