= Third Fadnavis ministry =

32nd ministry of Maharashtra

- 32nd ministry of the State of Maharashtra
- Incumbent
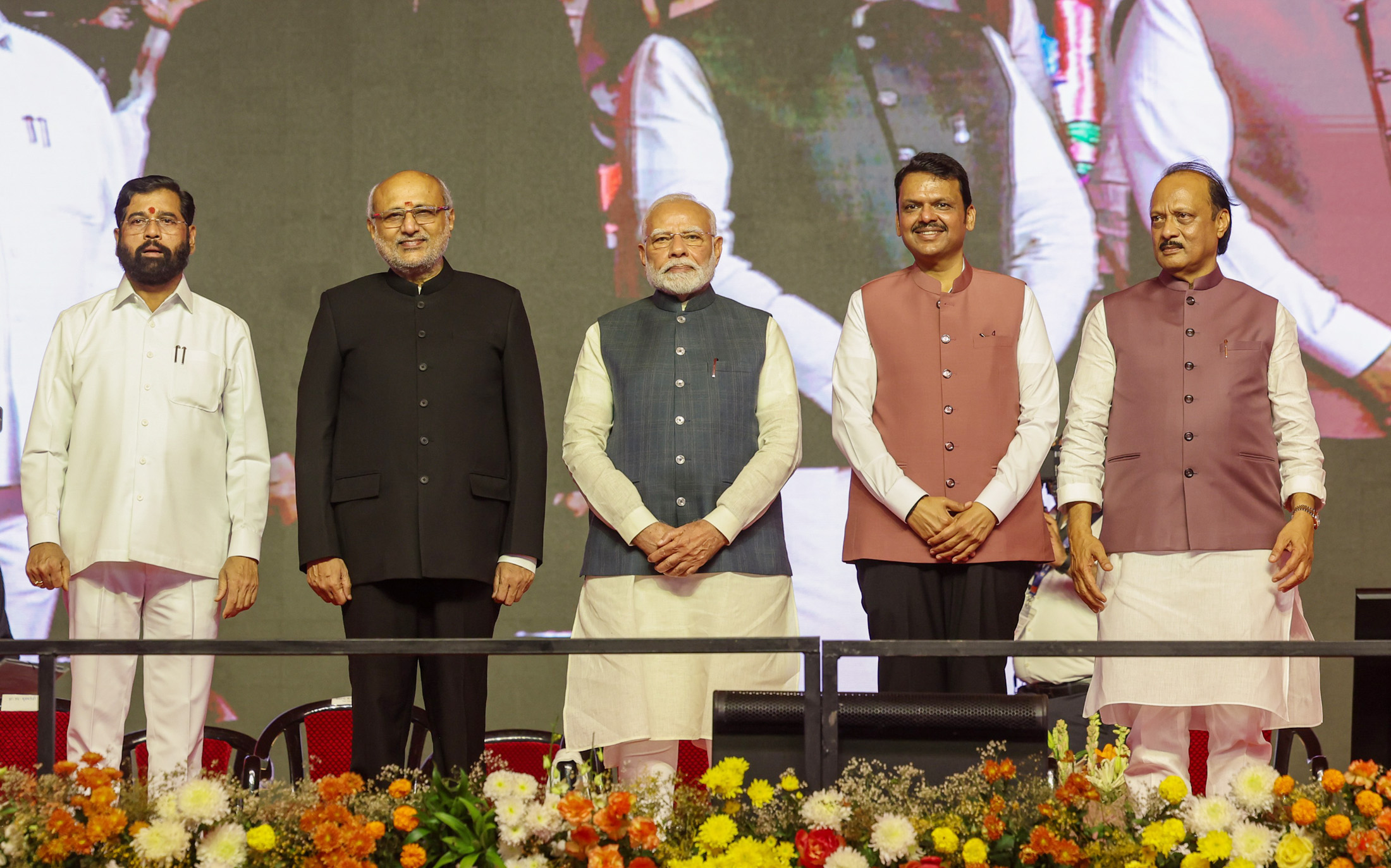
- (From left to right) Shinde, Governor Radhakrishnan, Prime Minister Modi, Fadnavis and Pawar at Azad Maidan, Mumbai during the swearing-in ceremony on 5 December 2024.
- Date formed: 5 December 2024 (20 months ago)

People and organisations
- Head of state: C. P. Radhakrishnan; Acharya Devvrat (additional charge); Jishnu Dev Varma
- Head of government: Devendra Fadnavis
- Deputy CMs: Eknath Shinde; Ajit Pawar (until 28 January 2026); Sunetra Pawar (from 31 January 2026)
- No. of ministers: 43
- Member parties: Maha Yuti: BJP; SHS; NCP
- Status in legislature: Majority government (coalition)
- Opposition parties: SS(UBT) (Note: As the largest opposition party in the assembly and council.) (Note: No party has obtained 10% or more for the recognition of official opposition in the Assembly and Council. Others include INC and NCP(SP).)
- Opposition leaders: Vacant (in Council and Assembly)

History
- Election: 2024
- Legislature term: 15th Assembly (2024-present)
- Predecessor: Eknath Shinde ministry

The Third Fadnavis ministry was formed on 5 December 2024 as the 32nd Government of Maharashtra. The ministry would likely consist of maximum 43 members. The then-governor, C. P. Radhakrishnan administered the oath of office and secrecy to the Chief Minister, Devendra Fadnavis and Deputy Chief Ministers, Eknath Shinde and Ajit Pawar, respectively at Azad Maidan, Mumbai. Pawar unexpectedly died in the 2026 Baramati Learjet 45 crash.

== Background ==
Assembly elections were held in November 2024. Maha Yuti (state alliance of the NDA) won 234 out of 288 seats contested, whereas Bharatiya Janata Party (BJP) got 132 seats, Shiv Sena (SHS) 57 seats and Nationalist Congress Party 41 seats. Other small parties and independents under the alliance got total of 4 seats. Later 2 independents lawmakers and Ravi Rana supported the Maha Yuti, making a total of 237 seats.

=== Motion of confidence ===
Fadnavis was elected as the leader of BJP Legislature Party in Maharashtra, thus resulting him to become chief minister for the third time.

== Council of Ministers ==
The cabinet expansion took place at Raj Bhavan in Nagpur on 15 December 2024. Maharashtra Cabinet can consist of a maximum of 43 ministers. 33 were inducted as cabinet ministers, 6 were sworn in as ministers of state. 19 ministers from the BJP, 11 from the Shiv Sena and 9 from the NCP took oath as cabinet ministers.

Cabinet ministers portfolios where allocated on 21 December 2024.

=== Cabinet Ministers ===
Portfolio	Minister	Took office	Left office	Party
Chief Minister: Minister of General Administration; Minister of Home Affairs; Minister of Law & Judiciary; Minister of Information & Public Relations; Minister of Energy (excluding Non-Conventional Energy); Other departments not allocated to any Minister.: Minister of Command Area Development; Earthquake Rehabilitation; Minister of Socially and Educationally Backward Classes; Minister of Vimukta Jati; Minister of Nomadic Tribes; Minister of Special Backward Classes Welfare; Minister of Majority Welfare Development	Devendra Fadnavis	5 December 2024	Incumbent	BJP
Deputy Chief Minister: Minister of Urban Development; Minister of Housing; Minister of Public Works (Including Public Undertakings)	Eknath Shinde	5 December 2024	Incumbent	SHS
Deputy Chief Minister	Ajit Pawar	5 December 2024	28 January 2026	NCP
Deputy Chief Minister	Sunetra Pawar	31 January 2026	Incumbent	NCP
Cabinet Minister: Minister of Finance; Minister of Planning	Ajit Pawar (Dy Chief Minister)	5 December 2024	28 January 2026	NCP
Cabinet Minister: Minister of Finance; Minister of Planning	Devendra Fadnavis (Chief Minister	28 January 2026	Incumbent	BJP
Cabinet Minister: Minister for State Excise	Ajit Pawar (Dy Chief Minister)	5 December 2024	28 January 2026	NCP
Cabinet Minister: Minister for State Excise	Devendra Fadnavis (Chief Minister; additional charge)	28 January 2026	31 January 2026	BJP
Cabinet Minister: Minister for State Excise	Sunetra Pawar (Dy Chief Minister)	31 January 2026	Incumbent	NCP
Cabinet Minister: Minister of Sports & Youth Welfare; Minister of Minority Development & Aukaf	Dattatray Bharne	15 December 2024	31 July 2025	NCP
Cabinet Minister: Minister of Sports & Youth Welfare; Minister of Minority Development & Aukaf	Manikrao Kokate	31 July 2025	17 December 2025	NCP
Cabinet Minister: Minister of Sports & Youth Welfare; Minister of Minority Development & Aukaf	Ajit Pawar (Dy Chief Minister)	17 December 2025	28 January 2026	NCP
Cabinet Minister: Minister of Sports & Youth Welfare; Minister of Minority Development & Aukaf	Devendra Fadnavis (Chief Minister; additional charge)	28 January 2026	31 January 2026	BJP
Cabinet Minister: Minister of Sports & Youth Welfare; Minister of Minority Development & Aukaf	Sunetra Pawar (Dy Chief Minister)	31 January 2026	Incumbent	NCP
Cabinet Minister: Minister of Water Resources (Godavari & Krishna Valley)	Radhakrishna Vikhe Patil	15 December 2024	Incumbent	BJP
Cabinet Minister: Minister of Revenue	Chandrashekhar Bawankule	15 December 2024	Incumbent	BJP
Cabinet Minister: Minister of Medical Education	Hasan Mushrif	15 December 2024	Incumbent	NCP
Cabinet Minister: Minister of Higher & Technical Education; Minister of Parliamentary Affairs	Chandrakant Patil	15 December 2024	Incumbent	BJP
Cabinet Minister: Minister of Water Resources (Vidharbha, Tapi, Konkan); Minister of Disaster Management	Girish Mahajan	15 December 2024	Incumbent	BJP
Cabinet Minister: Minister of Water Supply; Sanitation	Gulab Raghunath Patil	15 December 2024	Incumbent	SHS
Cabinet Minister: Minister of Forest	Ganesh Naik	15 December 2024	Incumbent	BJP
Cabinet Minister: Minister of School Education	Dadaji Bhuse	15 December 2024	Incumbent	SHS
Cabinet Minister: Minister of Soil & Water Conservation	Sanjay Rathod	15 December 2024	Incumbent	SHS
Cabinet Minister: Minister of Food and Civil Supplies; Minister of Consumer Affairs	Dhananjay Munde	15 December 2024	4 March 2025	NCP
Cabinet Minister: Minister of Food and Civil Supplies; Minister of Consumer Affairs	Ajit Pawar	4 March 2025	20 May 2025	NCP
Cabinet Minister: Minister of Food and Civil Supplies; Minister of Consumer Affairs	Chhagan Bhujbal	20 May 2025	Incumbent	NCP
Cabinet Minister: Minister of Skill Development & Entrepreneurship	Mangal Prabhat Lodha	15 December 2024	Incumbent	BJP
Cabinet Minister: Minister of Industries; Minister of Marathi Language	Uday Samant	15 December 2024	Incumbent	SHS
Cabinet Minister: Minister of Marketing; Minister of Protocol	Jayakumar Rawal	15 December 2024	Incumbent	BJP
Cabinet Minister: Minister of Environment & Climate Change; Minister of Animal Husbandry	Pankaja Munde	15 December 2024	Incumbent	BJP
Cabinet Minister: Minister of Other Backward Classes; Minister of Other Backward Bahujan Welfare; Minister of Dairy Development; Minister of New and Renewable Energy	Atul Save	15 December 2024	Incumbent	BJP
Cabinet Minister: Minister of Tribal Development	Ashok Uike	15 December 2024	Incumbent	BJP
Cabinet Minister: Minister of Tourism; Minister of Mining; Minister of Ex-Servicemen Welfare	Shambhuraj Desai	15 December 2024	Incumbent	SHS
Cabinet Minister: Minister of Information Technology; Minister of Cultural Affairs	Ashish Shelar	15 December 2024	Incumbent	BJP
Cabinet Minister: Minister of Women & Child Development	Aditi Tatkare	15 December 2024	Incumbent	NCP
Cabinet Minister: Minister of Public Works (excluding Public Undertakings)	Shivendra Raje Bhosale	15 December 2024	Incumbent	BJP
Cabinet Minister: Minister of Agriculture	Manikrao Kokate	15 December 2024	31 July 2025	NCP
Cabinet Minister: Minister of Agriculture	Dattatray Bharne	31 July 2025	Incumbent	NCP
Cabinet Minister: Minister of Rural Development; Minister of Panchayat Raj	Jaykumar Gore	15 December 2024	Incumbent	BJP
Cabinet Minister: Minister of Food & Drug Administration; Minister of Special Assistance	Narhari Zirwal	15 December 2024	Incumbent	NCP
Cabinet Minister: Minister of Textiles	Sanjay Savkare	15 December 2024	Incumbent	BJP
Cabinet Minister: Minister of Social Justice	Sanjay Shirsat	15 December 2024	Incumbent	SHS
Cabinet Minister: Minister of Transport	Pratap Sarnaik	15 December 2024	Incumbent	SHS
Cabinet Minister: Minister of Horticulture; Minister of Employment Guarantee; Minister of Khar Land Development	Bharatshet Gogawale	15 December 2024	Incumbent	SHS
Cabinet Minister: Minister of Relief & Rehabilitation	Makrand Jadhav - Patil	15 December 2024	Incumbent	NCP
Cabinet Minister: Minister of Fisheries; Minister of Ports Development	Nitesh Rane	15 December 2024	Incumbent	BJP
Cabinet Minister: Minister of Labour	Akash Fundkar	15 December 2024	Incumbent	BJP
Cabinet Minister: Minister of Co-operation	Babasaheb Patil	15 December 2024	Incumbent	NCP
Cabinet Minister: Minister of Public Health and Family Welfare	Prakashrao Abitkar	15 December 2024	Incumbent	SHS
Cabinet Minister: Minister of Disability Welfare	Devendra Fadnavis (Chief Minister; additional charge)	15 December 2024	15 December 2024	BJP
Cabinet Minister: Minister of Disability Welfare	Atul Save	15 December 2024	Incumbent	BJP
Minister of State (Independent Charge) for Border Defence	Devendra Fadnavis (Chief Minister; additional charge)	15 December 2024	13 February 2025	BJP
Minister of State (Independent Charge) for Border Defence	Chandrakant Patil (First)	13 February 2025	Incumbent	BJP
Minister of State (Independent Charge) for Border Defence	Shambhuraj Desai (Second)	13 February 2025	Incumbent	SS

=== Ministers of State ===
Portfolio	Minister	Took office	Left office	Party
Minister of State: Urban Development; Transport; Social Justice; Medical Education; Minority Development and Aukaf	Madhuri Misal	15 December 2024	Incumbent	BJP
Minister of State: Finance; Planning; Agriculture; Relief and Rehabilitation; Law and Judiciary; Labour	Ashish Jaiswal	15 December 2024	Incumbent	SHS
Minister of State: Home Affairs (Rural); Housing; School Education; Co-operation; Mining	Pankaj Bhoyar	15 December 2024	Incumbent	BJP
Minister of State: Water Supply; Sanitation; Public Health and Family Welfare; Energy; New and Renewable Energy; Woman and Child Development; Public Works (Including Public Undertakings)	Meghana Bordikar	15 December 2024	Incumbent	BJP
Minister of State: Industries; Public Works (excluding Public Undertakings); Higher Education and Technical Education; Tribal Development; Tourism; Soil and Water Conservation	Indranil Naik	15 December 2024	Incumbent	NCP
Minister of State: Home Affairs (Urban); Revenue; Rural Development; Panchayat Raj; Food and Civil Supplies; Consumer Affairs; Food and Drug Administration	Yogesh Kadam	15 December 2024	Incumbent	SHS
Minister of State: General Administration; Information Technology; Information and Public Relations; Environment and climate change; Ex. Servicemen Welfare; Majority Welfare Development; Earthquake Rehabilitation; Khar land Development; Disability Welfare; Socially and Educationally Backward Classes; Vimukta Jati; Nomadic Tribes; Special Backward Classes Welfare; Water Resources; Command Area Development; Protocol; Animal Husbandry; Dairy Development; Forests Department; Cultural Affairs; Fisheries Department; Textiles; Parliamentary Affairs; Employment Guarantee; Horticulture; Marketing; Marathi Language; Other Backward Classes; Other Backward Bahujan Welfare; State Excise; State Border Defence; Skill Development And Entrepreneurship; Special Assistance; Sports and Youth Welfare; Ports Development; Disaster Management	Departments have not been assigned to any Minister of State	15 December 2024	Incumbent	Independent

== Guardian Ministers ==
District	Minister	Took office	Left office	Party
Ahilya Nagar	Radhakrishna Vikhe Patil	18 January 2025	Incumbent	BJP
Akola	Akash Fundkar	18 January 2025	Incumbent	BJP
Amravati	Chandrashekhar Bawankule	18 January 2025	Incumbent	BJP
Beed	Ajit Pawar (Dy Chief Minister)	18 January 2025	28 January 2026	NCP
Beed	Devendra Fadnavis (Chief Minister; additional charge)	28 January 2026	3 February 2026	BJP
Beed	Sunetra Ajit Pawar (Dy Chief Minister)	3 February 2026	Incumbent	NCP
Bhandara	Sanjay Savkare	18 January 2025	Incumbent	BJP
Buldhana	Makrand Jadhav	18 January 2025	Incumbent	NCP
Chandrapur	Ashok Uike	18 January 2025	Incumbent	BJP
Chhatrapati Sambhaji Nagar	Sanjay Shirsat	18 January 2025	Incumbent	SHS
Dharashiv	Pratap Sarnaik	18 January 2025	Incumbent	SHS
Dhule	Jayakumar Rawal	18 January 2025	Incumbent	BJP
Gadchiroli	Devendra Fadnavis (Chief Minister)	18 January 2025	Incumbent	BJP
Gadchiroli	Ashish Jaiswal (co-in-charge)	18 January 2025	Incumbent	SHS
Gondia	Indranil Naik	18 January 2025	Incumbent	NCP
Hingoli	Narhari Zirwal	18 January 2025	Incumbent	NCP
Jalgaon	Gulabrao Patil	18 January 2025	Incumbent	SHS
Jalna	Pankaja Munde	18 January 2025	Incumbent	BJP
Kolhapur	Prakashrao Abitkar	18 January 2025	Incumbent	SHS
Kolhapur	Madhuri Misal (co-in-charge)	18 January 2025	Incumbent	BJP
Latur	Shivendra Raje Bhosale	18 January 2025	Incumbent	BJP
Mumbai City	Eknath Shinde (Dy Chief Minister)	18 January 2025	Incumbent	SHS
Mumbai Suburban	Ashish Shelar	18 January 2025	Incumbent	BJP
Mumbai Suburban	Mangal Prabhat Lodha (co-in-charge)	18 January 2025	Incumbent	BJP
Nagpur	Chandrashekhar Bawankule	18 January 2025	Incumbent	BJP
Nanded	Atul Save	18 January 2025	Incumbent	BJP
Nandurbar	Manikrao Kokate	18 January 2025	18 December 2025	NCP
Nandurbar	Ajit Pawar (Dy Chief Minister; additional charge)	18 December 2025	28 January 2026	NCP
Nandurbar	Devendra Fadnavis (Chief Minister; additional charge)	28 January 2026	Incumbent	BJP
Nashik	Girish Mahajan	18 January 2025	29 January 2025	BJP
Nashik	Devendra Fadnavis (Chief Minister; additional charge)	29 January 2025	Incumbent	BJP
Palghar	Ganesh Naik	18 January 2025	Incumbent	BJP
Parbhani	Meghana Bordikar	18 January 2025	Incumbent	BJP
Pune	Ajit Pawar (Dy Chief Minister)	18 January 2025	28 January 2026	NCP
Pune	Devendra Fadnavis (Chief Minister; additional charge)	28 January 2026	3 February 2026	BJP
Pune	Sunetra Ajit Pawar (Dy Chief Minister)	3 February 2026	Incumbent	NCP
Raigad	Aditi Tatkare	18 January 2025	29 January 2025	NCP
Raigad	Ajit Pawar (Dy Chief Minister; additional charge)	29 January 2025	28 January 2026	NCP
Raigad	Devendra Fadnavis (Chief Minister; additional charge)	28 January 2026	Incumbent	BJP
Ratnagiri	Uday Samant	18 January 2025	Incumbent	SHS
Sangli	Chandrakant Patil	18 January 2025	Incumbent	BJP
Satara	Shambhuraj Desai	18 January 2025	Incumbent	SHS
Sindhudurg	Nitesh Rane	18 January 2025	Incumbent	BJP
Solapur	Jaykumar Gore	18 January 2025	Incumbent	BJP
Thane	Eknath Shinde (Dy Chief Minister)	18 January 2025	Incumbent	SHS
Wardha	Pankaj Bhoyar	18 January 2025	Incumbent	BJP
Washim	Hasan Mushrif	18 January 2025	Incumbent	NCP
Yavatmal	Sanjay Rathod	18 January 2025	Incumbent	SHS

== Former Ministers ==
=== Former Deputy Chief Minister ===
Portfolio	Minister	Took office	Left office	Party
Department: Minister of Finance; Minister of Planning; Minister for State Excise; Minister of Sports & Youth Welfare (17 December 2025 - 28 January 2026 additional charge); Minister of Minority Development & Aukaf (17 December 2025 - 28 January 2026 additional charge); Guardian Minister: Beed District; Pune District; Raigad District (additional charge); Nandurbar District (additional charge)	Ajit Pawar (Dy Chief Minister)	5 December 2024	28 January 2026 (died)	NCP

=== Former Cabinet Ministers ===
Portfolio	Minister	Took office	Left office	Party
Department: Minister of Food and Civil Supplies; Minister of Consumer Affairs	Dhananjay Munde (Cabinet Minister)	15 December 2024	4 March 2025 (resigned)	NCP
Department: Minister of Agriculture (15 December 2024 - 31 July 2025); Minister of Sports & Youth Welfare (31 July 2025 - 17 December 2025); Minister of Minority Development & Aukaf (31 July 2025 - 17 December 2025); Guardian Minister: Nandurbar District	Manikrao Kokate (Cabinet Minister)	15 December 2024	17 December 2025 (resigned)	NCP

== Demographics of the Council of Ministers ==
District	No. of Ministers	Ministers
Ahilya Nagar	1	Radhakrishna Vikhe Patil
Akola		
Amravati		
Beed	1	Pankaja Munde
Bhandara		
Buldhana	1	Akash Fundkar
Chandrapur		
Chhatrapati Sambhaji Nagar	2	Atul Save; Sanjay Shirsat
Dharashiv		
Dhule	1	Jayakumar Rawal
Gadchiroli		
Gondia		
Hingoli		
Jalgaon	3	Girish Mahajan; Gulabrao Patil; Sanjay Savkare
Jalna		
Kolhapur	2	Hasan Mushrif; Prakashrao Abitkar
Latur	1	Babasaheb Patil
Mumbai City	1	Mangal Prabhat Lodha
Mumbai Suburban	1	Ashish Shelar
Nagpur	3	Devendra Fadnavis (Chief Minister); Chandrashekhar Bawankule; Ashish Jaiswal
Nanded		
Nandurbar		
Nashik	4	Dadaji Bhuse; Manikrao Kokate; Narhari Zirwal Chhagan Bhujbal
Palghar		
Parbhani	1	Meghana Bordikar
Pune	4	Sunetra Pawar; Chandrakant Patil; Dattatray Bharne; Madhuri Misal
Raigad	2	Aditi Tatkare; Bharatshet Gogawale
Ratnagiri	2	Uday Samant; Yogesh Kadam
Sangli		
Satara	4	Shambhuraj Desai; Shivendra Raje Bhosale; Jaykumar Gore; Makrand Jadhav - Patil
Sindhudurg	1	Nitesh Rane
Solapur		
Thane	3	Eknath Shinde; Ganesh Naik; Pratap Sarnaik
Wardha	1	Pankaj Bhoyar
Washim		
Yavatmal	3	Sanjay Rathod; Ashok Uike; Indranil Naik
Total	42	
