= Ministry of Marathi Language =

Ministry of Marathi Language, Government of Maharashtra
- मंत्रालय मराठी भाषा विभाग, महाराष्ट्र शासन

- Building of Administrative Headquarters of Mumbai

Ministry overview
- Jurisdiction: Republic of India
- Headquarters: Mantralay, Mumbai
- Minister responsible: Uday Samant, Cabinet Minister
- Deputy Minister responsible: since 29 June 2022
- Ministry executive: Tukaram Mundhe, IAS
- Parent department: Government of Maharashtra
- Child agencies: Rajya Marathi Vikas Sanstha; Bhasha Sanchnalay
- Website: marathi.gov.in

== Office ==
Minister of Marathi Language; मंत्री मराठी भाषा विभाग
- Seal of Maharashtra

- Flag of India

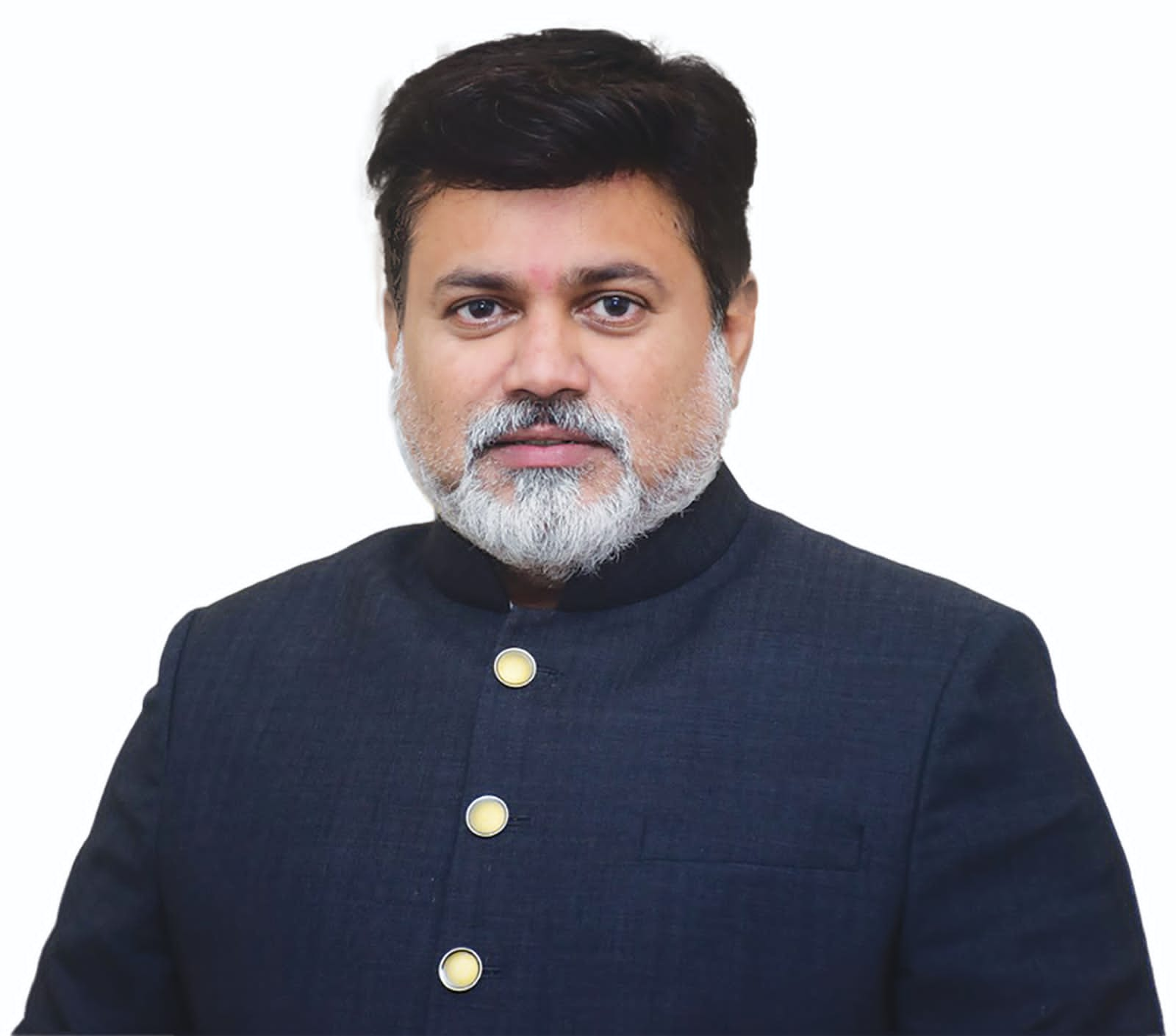
- Incumbent; Uday Samant since 21 December 2024
- Ministry of Marathi Language (Maharashtra)
- Style: The Honourable
- Member of: State Cabinet
- Reports to: Chief Minister; Maharashtra Legislature
- Seat: Mantralaya, Mumbai
- Appointer: Governor on the advice of the Chief Minister
- Term length: 5 years
- Precursor: Devendra Fadnavis; (2024-2024)
- Inaugural holder: Niramala Raje Bhosale; (1960-1962)
- Formation: 1 May 1960
- Deputy: Vacant since 29 June 2022

The Ministry of Marathi Language is a ministry in government of Maharashtra. Ministry is responsible for the promotion of Marathi language in India as well as abroad. Deepak Kesarkar is current Minister for Marathi Language. Language department offers free Marathi classes to non-Marathi speakers living in Maharashtra.

== Departments ==
Ministry of Marathi Language has one key department - Marathi Bhasha Vibhag (Marathi language department). Separate administrative department was established in 2010.

=== Child agencies ===
- Rajya Marathi Vikas Sanstha (State Institute for Marathi Development)
- Maharashtra Rajy Vishawakosh Nirmiti Mandal
- Maharashtra Rajya Sahitya aani Sankriti Mandal
- Bhasha Sanchanalay (Language Directorate)

== Marathi language ==
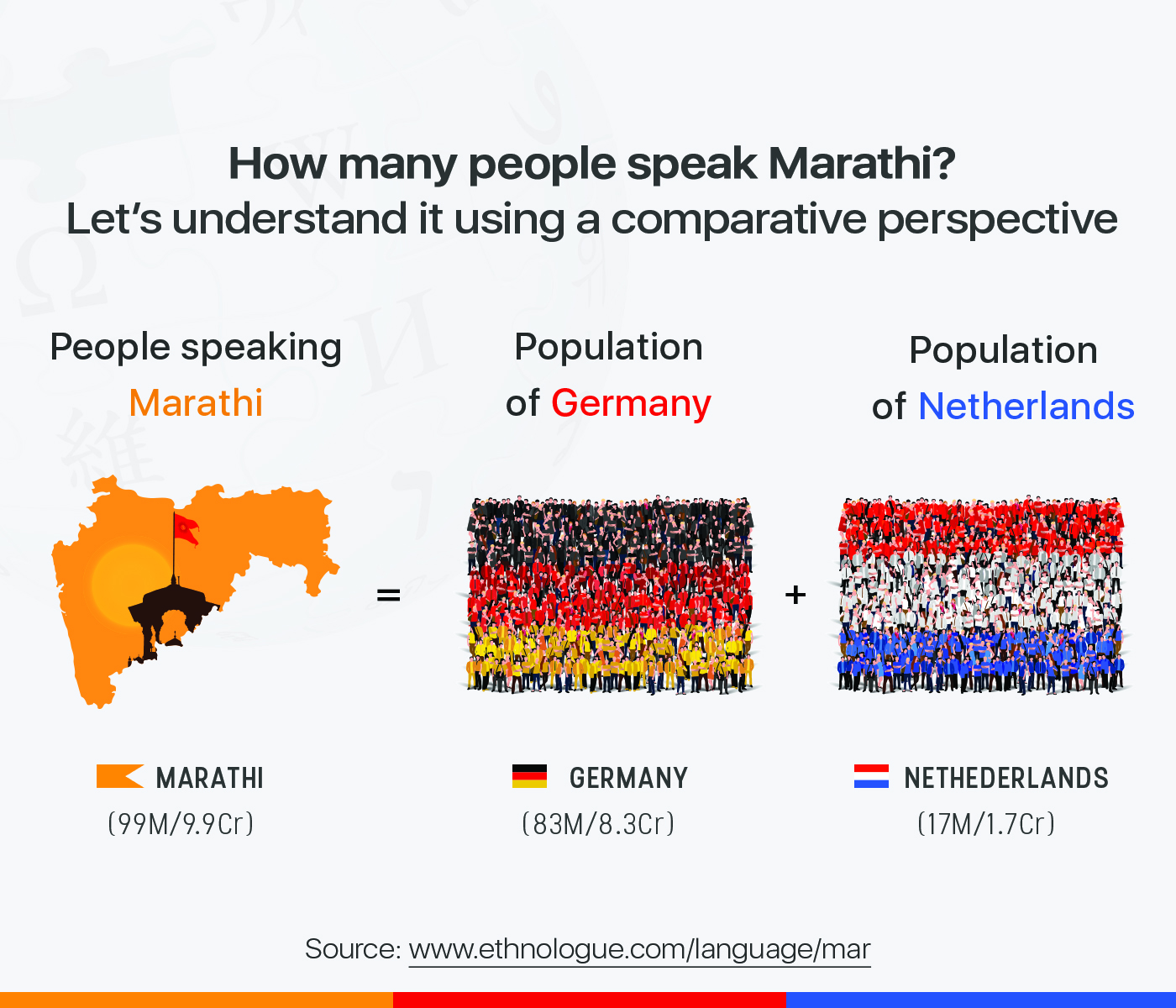
Marathi is one of the biggest language in the world.

Marathi is an Indo-Aryan language spoken predominantly by around 83 million Marathi people of Maharashtra, India. It is the official language and co-official language in the Maharashtra and Goa states of Western India, respectively and is one of the 22 scheduled languages of India. With 83 million speakers as 2011, Marathi ranks 10th in the list of languages with most native speakers in the world. Marathi has the third largest number of native speakers in India, after Hindi and Bengali. The language has some of the oldest literature of all modern Indian languages, dating from around 600 AD. The major dialects of Marathi are Standard Marathi and the Varhadi dialect. The Koli languages (Kachi Koli, Parkari Koli and Wadiyara Koli), Agri and Malvani Konkani have been heavily influenced by Marathi varieties.

=== Achieving classical language status ===
In 2004, the Government of India declared that languages that met certain requirements could be accorded the status of a "Classical Language" of India. The Marathi ministry has submitted an application to the Government of India to grant classical language status to Marathi. The Government of India is considering the request.

== Initiatives and activities ==
=== Awards ===
Various awards are given to exceptional people in the field of Marathi language.

- Yashwantrao Chavan Award
- Vi. Da. Karandikar Lifetime Achievement Award : Trophy and cash prize of ₹5,00,000
- P. Bhagawat Award : Trophy and cash prize of ₹3,00,000
- Bhasha Sanvardhan (Language Promotion) : Two cash prize awards of ₹1,00,000

=== Marathi language day ===
Marathi Language Day (मराठी दिन/मराठी दिवस transl. Marathi Dina/Marathi Diwasa) is celebrated on 27 February every year across the Indian states of Maharashtra and Goa. This day is regulated by the Ministry of Marathi language. It is celebrated on the Birthday of eminent Marathi Poet Vi. Va. Shirwadkar, popularly known as Kusumagraj.

Essay competitions and seminars are arranged in schools and colleges, and government officials are asked to conduct various events.

=== Use of Marathi in government offices ===
Ministry made it compulsory to use Marathi language in all Government of Maharashtra offices.

=== Marathi in schools ===
The Maharashtra Compulsory Teaching and Learning of Marathi Language in Schools Bill, 2020 was proposed by the Marathi ministry and passed by the Government of Maharashtra unanimously. Marathi language classes are mandatory in all schools of Maharashtra.

=== International collaboration ===
Internationalization efforts started in 2021 to engage international Marathi diaspora. Department launched various initiatives to popularize Marathi language outside India. US Consul General was felicitated for promoting US based organizations working in Marathi language.

== Cabinet Ministers ==
No.	Portrait	Minister (Constituency)	Term of office			Political party	Ministry	Chief Minister
No.	Portrait	Minister (Constituency)	From	To	Period	Political party	Ministry	Chief Minister
Minister of Marathi Language
01		Vasantrao Naik (MLA for Pusad Constituency No. 81- Yavatmal District) (Legislative Assembly)	01 May 1960	07 March 1962	1 year, 310 days	Indian National Congress	Yashwantrao I	Yashwantrao Chavan
02		Nirmala Raje Bhosale (MLA for Satara Constituency No. 268- Satara District) (Legislative Assembly)	08 March 1962	19 November 1962	256 days	Indian National Congress	Yashwantrao II	Yashwantrao Chavan
03		Madhukar Dhanaji Chaudhari (MLA for Raver Constituency No. 11- Jalgaon District) (Legislative Assembly)	20 November 1962	24 November 1963	1 year, 4 days	Indian National Congress	Kannamwar l	Marotrao Kannamwar
04		Parashuram Krishnaji Sawant (MLA for Chiplun Constituency No. 265- Ratnagiri District) (Legislative Assembly) (Interim Chief Minister)	25 November 1962	04 December 1963	9 days	Indian National Congress	Sawant	Parashuram Krishnaji Sawant
05		Sadashiv Govind Barve (MLA for Shivajinagar Constituency No. 209- Pune District) (Legislative Assembly)	05 December 1963	01 March 1967	3 years, 86 days	Indian National Congress	Vasantrao I	Vasantrao Naik
06		Balasaheb Desai (MLA for Patan Constituency No. 261- Satara District) (Legislative Assembly)	01 March 1967	27 October 1969	2 years, 240 days	Indian National Congress	Vasantrao II	Vasantrao Naik
07		Pratibha Patil (MLA for Jalgaon City Constituency No. 13- Jalgaon District) (Legislative Assembly)	27 October 1969	13 March 1972	2 years, 138 days	Indian National Congress	Vasantrao II	Vasantrao Naik
08		Vasantrao Patil (MLC for Elected by MLAs Constituency No. 20 - Sangli District) (Legislative Council)	13 March 1972	04 April 1973	1 year, 32 days	Indian National Congress	Vasantrao III	Vasantrao Naik
09		Narendra Mahipati Tidke (MLA for Savner Constituency No. 49- Nagpur District) (Legislative Assembly)	04 April 1973	17 Match; 1974	347 days	Indian National Congress	Vasantrao III	Vasantrao Naik
10		Hari Govindrao Vartak (MLA for Bassein-Vasai Constituency No. 180- Palghar District (Legislative Assembly)	17 Match; 1974	21 February 1975	341 days	Indian National Congress	Vasantrao III	Vasantrao Naik
11		Shankarrao Chavan (MLA for Bhokar Constituency No. 85- Nanded District) (Legislative Assembly) (Chief Minister)	21 February 1975	16 April 1977	2 years, 54 days	Indian National Congress	Shankarrao I	Shankarrao Chavan
12		Nashikrao Tirpude (MLA for Bhandara Constituency No. 61- Bhandara District) (Legislative Assembly)	17 April 1977	07 March 1978	1 year, 324 days	Indian National Congress	Vasantdada I	Vasantdada Patil
13		Prabha Rau (MLA for Pulgaon Constituency No. 41- Wardha District) (Legislative Assembly)	07 March 1978	18 July 1978	133 days	Indian National Congress (Indira)	Vasantdada II	Vasantdada Patil
14		Ganpatrao Deshmukh (MLA for Sangola Constituency No. 235- Solapur District (Legislative Assembly)	18 July 1978	19 November 1979	1 year, 124 days	Peasants and Workers Party of India	Pawar I	Sharad Pawar
15		Babasaheb Bhosale (MLA for Nehrunagar Constituency No. 172- Mumbai Suburban District) (Legislative Assembly)	09 June 1980	21 January 1982	1 year, 226 days	Indian National Congress	Antulay	Abdul Rahman Antulay
16		Shivajirao Patil Nilangekar (MLA for Nilanga Constituency No. 238- Latur District) (Legislative Assembly)	21 January 1982	02 February 1983	1 year, 12 days	Indian National Congress	Bhosale	Babasaheb Bhosale
17		Prataprao Baburao Bhosale (MLA for Wai Constituency No. 256- Satara District) (Legislative Assembly)	07 February 1983	05 March 1985	2 years, 26 days	Indian National Congress	Vasantdada III	Vasantdada Patil
18		Sudhakarrao Naik (MLA for Pusad Constituency No. 81- Yavatmal District) (Legislative Assembly)	12 March 1985	03 June 1985	83 days	Indian National Congress	Vasantdada IV	Vasantdada Patil
19		Jawaharlal Darda (MLC for Elected by MLAs Constituency No. 19 - Yavatmal District) (Legislative Council)	03 June 1985	12 March 1986	282 days	Indian National Congress	Nilangekar	Shivajirao Patil Nilangekar
20		Sushilkumar Shinde (MLA for Solapur City Central Constituency No. 249- Solapur District) (Legislative Assembly)	12 March 1986	26 June 1988	2 years, 106 days	Indian National Congress	Shankarrao II	Shankarrao Chavan
21		Narendra Marutrao Kamble (MLC for Elected by Governor Nominated No. 10 - Mumbai City District) (Legislative Council)	26 June 1988	03 March 1990	1 year, 250 days	Indian National Congress	Pawar II	Sharad Pawar
22		Surupsingh Hirya Naik (MLA for Navapur Constituency No. 04- Nandurbar District) (Legislative Assembly)	03 March 1990	25 June 1991	1 year, 114 days	Indian National Congress	Pawar III	Sharad Pawar
23		Shivajirao Deshmukh (MLC for Elected by MLAs Constituency No. 18 - Sangli District) (Legislative Council)	25 June 1991	22 February 1993	1 year, 242 days	Indian National Congress	Sudhakarrao	Sudhakarrao Naik
24		Vilasrao Deshmukh (MLA for Latur City Constituency No. 235- Latur District) (Legislative Assembly)	06 March 1993	18 November 1994	1 year, 257 days	Indian National Congress	Pawar IV	Sharad Pawar
25		Babanrao Gholap (MLA for Deolali Constituency No. 126- Pune District) (Legislative Assembly)	14 March 1995	01 February 1999	3 years, 324 days	Shiv Sena	Joshi	Manohar Joshi
26		Pramod Navalkar (MLC for Mumbai Graduates Constituency No. 06 - Mumbai City District) (Legislative Council)	01 February 1999	11 May 1999	99 days	Shiv Sena	Rane	Narayan Rane
27		Sureshdada Jain (MLA for Jalgaon City Constituency No. 13- Jalgaon District (Legislative Assembly)	11 May 1999	17 October 1999	159 days	Shiv Sena	Rane	Narayan Rane
28		Vilasrao Deshmukh (MLA for Latur City Constituency No. 235- Latur District) (Legislative Assembly) (Chief Minister)	19 October 1999	27 October 1999	8 days	Indian National Congress	Deshmukh I	Vilasrao Deshmukh
29		Ramkrishna More (MLA for Khed Constituency No. 219- Pune District) (Legislative Assembly)	27 October 1999	16 January 2003	3 years, 81 days	Indian National Congress	Deshmukh I	Vilasrao Deshmukh
30		Ashok Chavan (MLA for Mudkhed Constituency No. 85- Nanded District) (Legislative Assembly)	18 January 2003	01 November 2004	1 year, 295 days	Indian National Congress	Sushilkumar	Sushilkumar Shinde
31		Vilasrao Deshmukh (MLA for Latur City Constituency No. 235- Latur District) (Legislative Assembly) (Chief Minister)	01 November 2004	09 November 2004	8 days	Indian National Congress	Deshmukh II	Vilasrao Deshmukh
32		Ashok Chavan (MLA for Mudkhed Constituency No. 85- Nanded District) (Legislative Assembly)	09 November 2004	01 December 2008	4 years, 22 days	Indian National Congress	Deshmukh II	Vilasrao Deshmukh
33		Vijaykumar Krishnarao Gavit (MLA for Nandurbar Constituency No. 03- Nandurbar District) (Legislative Assembly)	08 December 2008	06 November 2009	333 days	Nationalist Congress Party	Ashok I	Ashok Chavan
34		Balasaheb Thorat (MLA for Sangamner Constituency No. 217- Ahmednagar District) (Legislative Assembly)	07 November 2009	10 November 2010	1 year, 3 days	Indian National Congress	Ashok II	Ashok Chavan
35		Radhakrishna Vikhe Patil (MLA for Shirdi Constituency No. 218- Ahmednagar District) (Legislative Assembly)	11 November 2010	26 September 2014	3 years, 319 days	Indian National Congress	Prithviraj	Prithviraj Chavan
36		Vinod Tawde (MLA for Borivali Constituency No. 152- Mumbai Suburban District (Legislative Assembly)	31 October 2014	12 November 2019	5 years, 12 days	Bharatiya Janata Party	Fadnavis I	Devendra Fadnavis
37		Devendra Fadnavis (MLA for Nagpur South West Constituency No. 52- Nagpur District) (Legislative Assembly) (Chief_Minister); In Charge	23 November 2019	28 November 2019	5 days	Bharatiya Janata Party	Fadnavis II	Devendra Fadnavis
38		Subhash Desai (MLC for Elected by MLAs Constituency No. 09 - Mumbai Suburban District) (Legislative Council)	28 November 2019	30 December 2019	32 days	Shiv Sena	Thackeray	Uddhav Thackeray
39		Subhash Desai (MLC for Elected by MLAs Constituency No. 09 - Mumbai Suburban District) (Legislative Council)	30 December 2019	29 June 2022	2 years, 181 days	Shiv Sena	Thackeray	Uddhav Thackeray
40		Eknath Shinde (MLA for Kopri-Pachpakhadi Constituency No. 147- Thane District) (Legislative Assembly) (Chief Minister); In Charge	30 June 2022	14 August 2022	45 days	Shiv Sena (2022–present)	Eknath	Eknath Shinde
41		Deepak Vasant Kesarkar (MLA for Sawantwadi Constituency No. 270- Sindhudurg District) (Legislative Assembly)	14 August 2022	26 November 2024	2 years, 135 days	Shiv Sena (2022–present)	Eknath	Eknath Shinde
42		Devendra Fadnavis (MLA for Nagpur South West Constituency No. 52- Nagpur District) (Legislative Assembly) (Chief_Minister); In Charge	05 December 2024	21 December 2024	16 days	Bharatiya Janata Party	Fadnavis III	Devendra Fadnavis
43		Uday Samant (MLA for Ratnagiri Constituency No. 266- Ratnagiri District (Legislative Assembly)	21 December 2024	Incumbent	1 year, 310 days	Shiv Sena (Shinde Group)	Fadnavis III	Devendra Fadnavis

== Ministers of State ==
No.	Portrait	Deputy Minister (Constituency)	Term of office			Political party	Ministry	Minister	Chief Minister
No.	Portrait	Deputy Minister (Constituency)	From	To	Period	Political party	Ministry	Minister	Chief Minister
Deputy Minister of Marathi Language
Vacant			23 November 2019	28 November 2019	5 days	NA	Fadnavis II	Devendra Fadnavis	Devendra Fadnavis
01		Vishwajeet Kadam (MLA for Palus-Kadegaon Constituency No. 285- Sangli District) (Legislative Assembly)	30 December 2019	29 June 2022	2 years, 181 days	Indian National Congress	Thackeray	Subhash Desai	Uddhav Thackeray
Vacant			30 June 2022	26 November 2024	2 years, 149 days	NA	Eknath	Eknath Shinde (2022 - 2022); Deepak Vasant Kesarkar (2022 – 2024)	Eknath Shinde
Vacant			21 December 2024	incumbent	1 year, 310 days	NA	Fadnavis III	Uday Samant (2024 – Present)	Devendra Fadnavis

== See also ==
- Marathi language
- Local government in Maharashtra
