= Narayan Rane ministry =

Government of Maharashtra, India in 1999

- Ministry of Maharashtra
- Narayan Rane, Former Chief Minister of Maharashtra
- Date formed: 1 February 1999
- Date dissolved: 17 October 1999

People and organisations
- Head of state: Governor P. C. Alexander
- Head of government: Narayan Rane
- Member parties: Shiv Sena; BJP
- Status in legislature: Coalition
- Opposition party: Indian National Congress
- Opposition leader: Madhukarrao Pichad (Congress) (Assembly); Chhagan Bhujbal (Congress) (until 10 June 1999), (NCP) (from 10 June 1999) (Council)

History
- Election: 1995
- Legislature term: 5 years
- Predecessor: Manohar Joshi ministry
- Successor: First Deshmukh ministry

Narayan Rane was sworn in as Chief Minister of Maharashtra state of India on 1 February 1999 as the leader of Shiv Sena- Bharatiya Janata Party alliance. He was elected as leader of the alliance following resignation of Manohar Joshi. There were 24 cabinet ministers (excluding himself) – 12 each from Shiv Sena and Bharatiya Janata Party.

== Cabinet rank ministers ==
From Shiv Sena

- Narayan Rane (Chief Minister)
- Radhakrishna Vikhe Patil (Cabinet Minister)
- Sudhir Joshi (Cabinet Minister)
- Pramod Navalkar (Cabinet Minister)
- Leeladhar Dake (Cabinet Minister)
- Sabir Shaikh (Cabinet Minister)
- Dr Jaiprakash Mundada (Cabinet Minister)
- Babanrao Gholap (Cabinet Minister)
- Chandrakant Khaire (Cabinet Minister)
- Sureshdada Jain (Cabinet Minister)
- Diwakar Raote (Cabinet Minister)
- Gajanan Kirtikar (Cabinet Minister)

From Bharatiya Janata Party

- Gopinath Munde' (Deputy Chief Minister)
- Nitin Gadkari (Cabinet Minister)
- Anna Dange (Cabinet Minister)
- Mahadeorao Sukaji Shivankar (Cabinet Minister)
- Shobha Phadanvis (Cabinet Minister)
- Dr Daulatrao Aher (Cabinet Minister)
- Haribhau Bagade (Cabinet Minister)
- Eknath Khadse (Cabinet Minister)
- Dattatraya Rane (Cabinet Minister)
- Prakash Mehta (Cabinet Minister)
- Sudhir Mungantiwar (Cabinet Minister)
- Vishnu Savara (Cabinet Minister)

== Ministers of State ==
=== From Shiv Sena ===
- Prabhakar More – Minister of state for Home
- Ravindra Mane – Minister of State for Urban Development
- Ramdas Kadam
- Arjun Khotkar
- Prataprao Ganpatrao Jadhav
- Kalidas Kolambkar
- Uttamprakash Khandare
- Manisha Nimkar

=== From Bharatiya Janata Party ===
- Raj Purohit
- Vinod Gudadhe Patil
- Vinayak Korde
- Vijay Girkar
- Pratapsinh Mohite-Patil
- Udayanraje Bhosale

=== Independents ===
- Harshavardhan Patil
- Anil Deshmukh
- Shivajirao Naik
- Babasaheb Dhabekar
- Vijaykumar Gavit
- Dilip Sopal
- Badamrao Pandit
- Dr Ramesh Gajbe
- Bharmuanna Patil

== Ministry ==
Portfolio	Minister	Took office	Left office	Party
Chief Minister.: General Administration; Information and Publicity; Information Technology; Departments or portfolios not allocated to any minister.	Narayan Rane	1 February 1999	17 October 1999	SS
Deputy Chief Minister: Home Affairs; State Border Defence (First)	Gopinath Munde	1 February 1999	17 October 1999	BJP
Cabinet Minister: State Excise	Narayan Rane (CM)	1 February 1999	11 May 1999	SS
Cabinet Minister: State Excise	Anna Dange	11 May 1999	17 October 1999	BJP
Cabinet Minister: Food and Drug Administration	Narayan Rane (CM)	1 February 1999	11 May 1999	SS
Cabinet Minister: Food and Drug Administration	Pramod Navalkar	11 May 1999	17 October 1999	SS
Cabinet Minister: Mining Department	Narayan Rane (CM)	1 February 1999	11 May 1999	SS
Cabinet Minister: Mining Department	Leeladhar Dake	11 May 1999	17 October 1999	SS
Cabinet Minister: Industries	Narayan Rane (CM)	1 February 1999	11 May 1999	SS
Cabinet Minister: Industries	Nitin Gadkari	11 May 1999	17 October 1999	BJP
Cabinet Minister: Protocol	Narayan Rane (CM)	1 February 1999	11 May 1999	SS
Cabinet Minister: Protocol	Gopinath Munde (DCM)	11 May 1999	17 October 1999	BJP
Cabinet Minister: Ex-Servicemen Welfare	Narayan Rane (CM)	1 February 1999	11 May 1999	SS
Cabinet Minister: Ex-Servicemen Welfare	Gopinath Munde (DCM)	11 May 1999	17 October 1999	BJP
Cabinet Minister: Fisheries	Narayan Rane (CM)	1 February 1999	11 May 1999	SS
Cabinet Minister: Fisheries	Eknath Khadse	1 February 1999	11 May 1999	BJP
Cabinet Minister: Disaster Management	Gopinath Munde (DCM)	1 February 1999	11 May 1999	BJP
Cabinet Minister: Disaster Management	Narayan Rane (CM)	11 May 1999	17 October 1999	SS
Cabinet Minister: Forests	Gopinath Munde (DCM)	1 February 1999	11 May 1999	BJP
Cabinet Minister: Forests	Sudhir Joshi	11 May 1999	17 October 1999	SS
Cabinet Minister: Command Area Development	Gopinath Munde (DCM)	1 February 1999	11 May 1999	BJP
Cabinet Minister: Command Area Development	Narayan Rane (CM)	11 May 1999	17 October 1999	SS
Cabinet Minister: Public Works (Excluding Public Undertakings); Public Works (Including Public Undertakings)	Nitin Gadkari	1 February 1999	17 October 1999	BJP
Cabinet Minister: Agriculture	Radhakrishna Vikhe Patil	1 February 1999	17 October 1999	SS
Cabinet Minister: State Border Defence (Second)	Sudhir Joshi	1 February 1999	17 October 1999	SS
Cabinet Minister: Legislative Affairs/ Parliamently Affairs; Law and Judiciary	Leeladhar Dake	1 February 1999	17 October 1999	SS
Cabinet Minister: Minority Development and Aukab	Sabir Shaikh	1 February 1999	17 October 1999	SS
Cabinet Minister: Cooperation	Jaiprakash Mundada	1 February 1999	17 October 1999	SS
Cabinet Minister: Social Welfare	Babanrao Gholap	1 February 1999	17 October 1999	SS
Cabinet Minister: Medical Education	Daulatrao Aher	1 February 1999	17 October 1999	BJP
Cabinet Minister: Sports and Youth Welfare	Sudhir Mungantiwar	1 February 1999	17 October 1999	BJP
Cabinet Minister: Finance; Planning	Eknath Khadse	1 February 1999	11 May 1999	BJP
Cabinet Minister: Finance; Planning	Mahadeorao Sukaji Shivankar	11 May 1999	17 October 1999	SS
Cabinet Minister: Irrigation (Krishna Valley Development); Irrigation (Konkan Valley Development)	Eknath Khadse	1 February 1999	11 May 1999	BJP
Cabinet Minister: Irrigation (Krishna Valley Development); Irrigation (Konkan Valley Development)	Narayan Rane (CM)	11 May 1999	17 October 1999	SS
Cabinet Minister: Dairy Development; Animal Husbandry	Radhakrishna Vikhe Patil	1 February 1999	11 May 1999	SS
Cabinet Minister: Dairy Development; Animal Husbandry	Narayan Rane (CM)	11 May 1999	17 October 1999	SS
Cabinet Minister: Environment and Climate Change	Radhakrishna Vikhe Patil	1 February 1999	11 May 1999	SS
Cabinet Minister: Environment and Climate Change	Chandrakant Khaire	11 May 1999	17 October 1999	SS
Cabinet Minister: Textiles	Nitin Gadkari	1 February 1999	11 May 1999	BJP
Cabinet Minister: Textiles	Jaiprakash Mundada	11 May 1999	17 October 1999	SS
Cabinet Minister: Irrigation	Nitin Gadkari	1 February 1999	11 May 1999	BJP
Cabinet Minister: Irrigation	Eknath Khadse	11 May 1999	17 October 1999	BJP
Cabinet Minister: Revenue	Sudhir Joshi	1 February 1999	11 May 1999	SS
Cabinet Minister: Revenue	Narayan Rane (CM)	11 May 1999	17 October 1999	SS
Cabinet Minister: Rural Development; Panchayat Raj	Sudhir Joshi	1 February 1999	11 May 1999	SS
Cabinet Minister: Rural Development; Panchayat Raj	Gopinath Munde (DCM)	11 May 1999	17 October 1999	BJP
Cabinet Minister: Housing	Anna Dange	1 February 1999	11 May 1999	BJP
Cabinet Minister: Housing	Sabir Shaikh	11 May 1999	17 October 1999	SS
Cabinet Minister: Slum Improvement	Anna Dange	1 February 1999	11 May 1999	BJP
Cabinet Minister: Slum Improvement	Sabir Shaikh	11 May 1999	17 October 1999	SS
Cabinet Minister: Horticulture	Anna Dange	1 February 1999	11 May 1999	BJP
Cabinet Minister: Horticulture	Sureshdada Jain	11 May 1999	17 October 1999	SS
Cabinet Minister: Tourism	Pramod Navalkar	1 February 1999	11 May 1999	SS
Cabinet Minister: Tourism	Eknath Khadse	11 May 1999	17 October 1999	BJP
Cabinet Minister: House Repairs and Reconstruction	Pramod Navalkar	1 February 1999	11 May 1999	SS
Cabinet Minister: House Repairs and Reconstruction	Vishnu Savara	11 May 1999	17 October 1999	BJP
Cabinet Minister: Marketing	Mahadeorao Sukaji Shivankar	1 February 1999	11 May 1999	BJP
Cabinet Minister: Marketing	Anna Dange	11 May 1999	17 October 1999	BJP
Cabinet Minister: Majority Welfare Development	Leeladhar Dake	1 February 1999	11 May 1999	SS
Cabinet Minister: Majority Welfare Development	Pramod Navalkar	11 May 1999	17 October 1999	SS
Cabinet Minister: Food & Civil Supply, Consumer Affairs	Shobha Phadanvis	1 February 1999	11 May 1999	BJP
Cabinet Minister: Food & Civil Supply, Consumer Affairs	Mahadeorao Sukaji Shivankar	11 May 1999	17 October 1999	BJP
Cabinet Minister: Relief & Rehabilitation	Sabir Shaikh	1 February 1999	11 May 1999	SS
Cabinet Minister: Relief & Rehabilitation	Prakash Mehta	11 May 1999	17 October 1999	BJP
Cabinet Minister: Labour	Sabir Shaikh	1 February 1999	11 May 1999	SS
Cabinet Minister: Labour	Babanrao Gholap	11 May 1999	17 October 1999	SS
Cabinet Minister: Tribal Development	Daulatrao Aher	1 February 1999	11 May 1999	BJP
Cabinet Minister: Tribal Development	Vishnu Savara	11 May 1999	17 October 1999	BJP
Cabinet Minister: Water Supply; Sanitation	Jaiprakash Mundada	1 February 1999	11 May 1999	SS
Cabinet Minister: Water Supply; Sanitation	Radhakrishna Vikhe Patil	11 May 1999	17 October 1999	SS
Cabinet Minister: Socially and Educationally Backward Classes	Haribhau Bagade	1 February 1999	11 May 1999	BJP
Cabinet Minister: Socially and Educationally Backward Classes	Daulatrao Aher	11 May 1999	17 October 1999	BJP
Cabinet Minister: Employment Guarantee	Haribhau Bagade	1 February 1999	11 May 1999	BJP
Cabinet Minister: Employment Guarantee	Radhakrishna Vikhe Patil	11 May 1999	17 October 1999	SS
Cabinet Minister: Special Backward Classes Welfare	Babanrao Gholap	1 February 1999	11 May 1999	SS
Cabinet Minister: Special Backward Classes Welfare	Gopinath Munde (DCM)	11 May 1999	17 October 1999	BJP
Cabinet Minister: Urban Development	Dattatraya Rane	1 February 1999	11 May 1999	BJP
Cabinet Minister: Urban Development	Sudhir Joshi	11 May 1999	17 October 1999	SS
Cabinet Minister: Public Health and Family Welfare	Babanrao Gholap	1 February 1999	11 May 1999	SS
Cabinet Minister: Public Health and Family Welfare	Daulatrao Aher	11 May 1999	17 October 1999	BJP
Cabinet Minister: Other Backward Classes	Babanrao Gholap	1 February 1999	11 May 1999	SS
Cabinet Minister: Other Backward Classes	Gopinath Munde (DCM)	11 May 1999	17 October 1999	BJP
Cabinet Minister: Skill Development and Entrepreneurship	Prakash Mehta	1 February 1999	11 May 1999	BJP
Cabinet Minister: Skill Development and Entrepreneurship	Haribhau Bagade	11 May 1999	17 October 1999	BJP
Cabinet Minister: School Education	Prakash Mehta	1 February 1999	11 May 1999	BJP
Cabinet Minister: School Education	Shobha Phadanvis	11 May 1999	17 October 1999	BJP
Cabinet Minister: Soil and Water Conservation	Chandrakant Khaire	1 February 1999	11 May 1999	SS
Cabinet Minister: Soil and Water Conservation	Sureshdada Jain	11 May 1999	17 October 1999	SS
Cabinet Minister: Energy	Chandrakant Khaire	1 February 1999	11 May 1999	SS
Cabinet Minister: Energy	Nitin Gadkari	11 May 1999	17 October 1999	BJP
Cabinet Minister: Woman and Child Development	Chandrakant Khaire	1 February 1999	11 May 1999	SS
Cabinet Minister: Woman and Child Development	Shobha Phadanvis	11 May 1999	17 October 1999	BJP
Cabinet Minister: Nomadic Tribesl Department	Vishnu Savara	1 February 1999	11 May 1999	BJP
Cabinet Minister: Nomadic Tribesl Department	Gajanan Kirtikar	11 May 1999	17 October 1999	SS
Cabinet Minister: Vimukta Jati	Vishnu Savara	1 February 1999	11 May 1999	BJP
Cabinet Minister: Vimukta Jati	Dattatraya Rane	11 May 1999	17 October 1999	BJP
Cabinet Minister: Higher and Technical Education	Sureshdada Jain	1 February 1999	11 May 1999	SS
Cabinet Minister: Higher and Technical Education	Prakash Mehta	11 May 1999	17 October 1999	BJP
Cabinet Minister: Special Assistance	Sureshdada Jain	1 February 1999	11 May 1999	SS
Cabinet Minister: Special Assistance	Haribhau Bagade	11 May 1999	17 October 1999	BJP
Cabinet Minister: Marathi Language	Sureshdada Jain	1 February 1999	11 May 1999	SS
Cabinet Minister: Marathi Language	Pramod Navalkar	11 May 1999	17 October 1999	SS
Cabinet Minister: Culture Affairs	Diwakar Raote	1 February 1999	11 May 1999	SS
Cabinet Minister: Culture Affairs	Dattatraya Rane	11 May 1999	17 October 1999	BJP
Cabinet Minister: Ports Development	Diwakar Raote	1 February 1999	11 May 1999	SS
Cabinet Minister: Ports Development	Narayan Rane (CM)	11 May 1999	17 October 1999	SS
Cabinet Minister: Employment	Diwakar Raote	1 February 1999	11 May 1999	SS
Cabinet Minister: Employment	Gajanan Kirtikar	11 May 1999	17 October 1999	SS
Cabinet Minister: Transport	Gajanan Kirtikar	1 February 1999	11 May 1999	SS
Cabinet Minister: Transport	Diwakar Raote	11 May 1999	17 October 1999	SS
Cabinet Minister: Earthquake Rehabilitation	Gajanan Kirtikar	1 February 1999	11 May 1999	SS
Cabinet Minister: Earthquake Rehabilitation	Chandrakant Khaire	11 May 1999	17 October 1999	SS
Cabinet Minister: Khar Land Development	Sudhir Joshi	1 February 1999	11 May 1999	SS
Cabinet Minister: Khar Land Development	Gopinath Munde (DCM)	11 May 1999	17 October 1999	SS
Cabinet Minister	[[]]	1 February 1999	11 May 1999	SS
Cabinet Minister	[[]]	11 May 1999	17 October 1999	SS

== See also ==
- Manohar Joshi ministry
