= Manohar Joshi ministry =

1995–1999 Indian state government

- Ministry of the State of Maharashtra
- Date formed: 14 March 1995
- Date dissolved: 31 January 1999

People and organisations
- Head of state: Dr. P. C. Alexander (Governor)
- Head of government: Manohar Joshi (Shiv Sena)
- Deputy head of government: Gopinath Munde (BJP)
- Member parties: SS (14); BJP (14)
- Status in legislature: Coalition
- Opposition party: INC

History
- Election: 1995
- Predecessor: Fourth Pawar ministry
- Successor: Narayan Rane ministry

Manohar Joshi was Chief Minister of Maharashtra from 14 March 1995 – 31 January 1999. His cabinet ministers were:

== Chief Minister and Cabinet ministers ==
Portfolio	Minister	Took office	Left office	Party
Chief Minister: General Administration; Information and Public Relations; Information Technology; House Repairs and Reconstruction; Slum Improvement; Departments or portfolios not allocated to any minister.	Manohar Joshi	14 March 1995	31 January 1999	SS
Deputy Chief Minister: Home Affairs; Other Backward Classes; Special Backward Classes Welfare	Gopinath Munde	14 March 1995	31 January 1999	BJP
Cabinet Minister: Finance; Planning	Hashu Advani	14 March 1995	18 September 1995	BJP
Cabinet Minister: Finance; Planning	Eknath Khadse	18 September 1995	10 June 1997	BJP
Cabinet Minister: Finance; Planning	Mahadeorao Sukaji Shivankar	10 June 1997	31 January 1999	BJP
Cabinet Minister: Public Works (Excluding Public Undertakings); Public Works (Including Public Undertakings); Marketing; State Border Defence (First)	Nitin Gadkari	14 March 1995	31 January 1999	BJP
Cabinet Minister: Revenue; Khar Land Development; Relief and Rehabilitation; School Education	Sudhir Joshi	14 March 1995	31 January 1999	SS
Cabinet Minister: Transport	Pramod Navalkar	14 March 1995	31 January 1999	SS
Cabinet Minister: Agriculture; Horticulture; Soil and Water Conservation	Shashikant Sutar	14 March 1995	31 January 1999	SS
Cabinet Minister: Dairy Development; Animal Husbandry; Fisheries	Narayan Rane	14 March 1995	31 January 1999	SS
Cabinet Minister: Public Health and Family Welfare; Medical Education and Drugs; Socially And Educationally Backward Classes; Other Backward Bahujan Welfare	Daulatrao Aher	14 March 1995	31 January 1999	BJP
Cabinet Minister: Higher and Technical Education	Prakash Mehta	14 March 1995	31 January 1999	BJP
Cabinet Minister: Irrigation; Command Area Development; Vimukta Jati	Mahadeorao Sukaji Shivankar	14 March 1995	10 June 1997	BJP
Cabinet Minister: Irrigation; Command Area Development; Vimukta Jati	Eknath Khadse	10 June 1997	31 January 1999	BJP
Cabinet Minister: Labour; Employment; Minority Development and Aukab	Sabir Shaikh	14 March 1995	31 January 1999	SS
Cabinet Minister: Industries; Mining Department; Law and Judiciary; Parliamentary Affairs	Liladhar Dake	14 March 1995	31 January 1999	SS
Cabinet Minister: Employment Guarantee	Haribhau Bagade	14 March 1995	31 January 1999	BJP
Cabinet Minister: Food & Civil Supply; Consumer Affairs; Woman and Child Development	Shobha Fadnavis	14 March 1995	31 January 1999	BJP
Cabinet Minister: Forest; Environment; Ports Development	Ganesh Naik	14 March 1995	31 January 1999	SS
Cabinet Minister: Cooperation; Textiles	Jaiprakash Mundada	14 March 1995	31 January 1999	SS
Cabinet Minister: Housing; State Border Defence (Second)	Chandrakant Khaire	14 March 1995	31 January 1999	SS
Cabinet Minister: Tourism; Excise	Jagannath Patil	14 March 1995	31 January 1999	BJP
Cabinet Minister: Rural Development; Panchayat Raj; Water Supply; Sanitation; Ex-Servicemen Welfare	Anna Dange	14 March 1995	31 January 1999	BJP
Cabinet Minister: Irrigation Irrigation (Krishna Valley Development); Irrigation (Konkan Valley Development); Cultural Affairs	Eknath Khadse	14 March 1995	31 January 1999	BJP
Cabinet Minister: Skill Development; Entrepreneurship; Earthquake Rehabilitation	Radhakrishna Vikhe Patil	14 March 1995	31 January 1999	SS
Cabinet Minister: Food and Drug Administration(FDA)	Diwakar Raote	14 March 1995	31 January 1999	SS
Cabinet Minister: Social Welfare; Marathi Language; Sports and Youth Welfare; Majority Welfare Development	Babanrao Gholap	14 March 1995	31 January 1999	SS
Cabinet Minister: Energy; New and Renewable Energy	Sureshdada Jain	14 March 1995	31 January 1999	SS
Cabinet Minister: Urban Development; Nomadic Tribes; Tribal Development	Datta Rane	14 March 1995	31 January 1999	BJP
Cabinet Minister: Protocol; Disaster Management	Dinkar Patil	14 March 1995	31 January 1999	BJP

== Ministers of State ==
Ministers of State
Prabhakar More	Home; Industries; General Information	SHS
Ravindra Mane	Finance; Urban Development	SHS
Sudhir Mungantiwar	Tourism	BJP
Raj K. Purohit		BJP
Ramdas Kadam	Food; Civil Supplies; Ports	SHS
Vinod Gudadhe Patil		BJP
Arjun Khotkar	Textile; Industry; Tourism	SHS
Prataprao Ganpatrao Jadhav	Sports; Youth Welfare; Irrigation	SHS
Vinayak Korde		BJP
Kalidas Kolambkar		SHS
Uttamprakash Khandare		SHS
Harshvardhan Patil		IND
Manisha Nimkar		SHS
Shivajirao Naik		IND
Vijay Girkar		BJP
Pratapsinh Mohite-Patil		BJP
Anil Deshmukh	Education	IND
Udayanraje Bhosale		BJP
Babasaheb Dhabekar		IND
Vijaykumar Gavit		IND
Dilip Sopal		IND
Badamrao Pandit		IND
Dr. Ramesh Gajbe		IND
Bharmuanna Patil		IND

=== From Bharatiya Janata Party ===
- Sudhir Mungantiwar: Tourism

== Ministers by Party ==
Representation of cabinet ministers by party
1. Shiv Sena (51.0%)
2. Bharatiya Janata Party (42.0%)
3. Independent (7.00%)

Party	Cabinet Ministers	Ministers of State	Total Ministers
SHS	13	9	22
BJP	13	7	20
IND	-	9	9

== See also ==
Narayan Rane ministry
