= Chandrakant Nawghare =

Indian politician

Chandrakant alias Rajubhaiya Navghare

Personal details
- Born: 8 October 1981 (age 44) Babhulgaon, Maharashtra, India
- Party: Nationalist Congress Party
- Occupation: Politician

Chandrakant Ramakant Navghare commonly known as Rajubhaiya Navghare, is a member of the 13th Maharashtra Legislative Assembly. He represents Basmath (Vidhan Sabha constituency). He got elected in 2019 Maharashtra Legislative Assembly election & 2024. Navghare is from Nationalist Congress Party. Rajubhaiya Navghare was first elected as a Member of the gram panchayat, then he was sarpanch from Babhulgaon. Rajubhaiya was also elected two times as agriculture produce market Committee Chairman, Director Rokdeshwar Cooperative Textile mill and Director of Purna cooperative Sugar factory.

== See also ==
- Panditrao Ramrao Deshmukh
- Manohar Joshi ministry
- Narayan Rane

.
