= Mahad Assembly constituency =

Constituency of the Maharashtra legislative assembly in India

Coordinates: 18°04′38.66″N 73°25′23.61″E

Mahad
- Constituency No. 194 for the Maharashtra Legislative Assembly

Constituency details
- Country: India
- Region: Western India
- State: Maharashtra
- District: Raigad
- Lok Sabha constituency: Raigad
- Established: 1952
- Total electors: 296,832
- Reservation: None

Member of Legislative Assembly
- 15th Maharashtra Legislative Assembly
- Incumbent Bharatshet Gogawale
- Party: SHS
- Alliance: NDA
- Elected year: 2019

Mahad Assembly constituency is one of the 288 Vidhan Sabha (legislative assembly) constituencies in Maharashtra state in western India. This constituency is located in the Raigad district. It is a part of Raigad Lok Sabha constituency along with five other Vidhan Sabha constituencies namely, Dapoli and Guhagar (Ratnagiri district) and Pen, Alibag, Shrivardhan (Raigad district).

== Members of the Legislative Assembly ==
Year	Member	Party
From 1952 - 1957 see: Poladpur Mahad
1952	Purohit Digambar Vinayak Nanasaheb	Socialist Party
1957	Purohit Digambar Vinayak Nanasaheb	Praja Socialist Party
1962	Shankar Sawant	Indian National Congress
1967	Shankar Sawant	Indian National Congress
1972	Purohit Digambar Vinayak Nanasaheb	Samyukta Socialist Party
1978	Purohit Digambar Vinayak Nanasaheb	Janata Party
1980	Chandrakant Deshmukh	Indian National Congress (I)
1985	Shantaram Philse	Janata Party
1990	Prabhakar More	Shiv Sena
1995	Prabhakar More	Shiv Sena
1999	Prabhakar More	Shiv Sena
2004	Manikrao Jagtap	Nationalist Congress Party
2009	Bharatshet Gogawale	Shiv Sena
2014	Bharatshet Gogawale	Shiv Sena
2019	Bharatshet Gogawale	Shiv Sena
2024	Bharatshet Gogawale	Shiv Sena

== Election results ==
=== Assembly Election 2024 ===
2024 Maharashtra Legislative Assembly election : Mahad
Party	Candidate	Votes	%	±%
SS	Bharatshet Gogawale	117,442	55.28%	▲1.12
SS(UBT)	Snehal Manikrao Jagtap-Kamat	91,232	42.95%	New
VBA	Anandraj Ravindra Ghadge	1,510	0.71%	▲0.07
NOTA	None of the Above	889	0.42%	▼0.68
Margin of victory		26,210	12.34%	▲0.91
Turnout		213,325	71.87%	▲5.28
Total valid votes		212,436		
Registered electors		296,832		▲4.21
SS hold		Swing	▲1.12	

=== Assembly Election 2019 ===
2019 Maharashtra Legislative Assembly election : Mahad
Party	Candidate	Votes	%	±%
SS	Bharatshet Gogawale	102,273	54.16%	▲1.66
INC	Manikrao Motiram Jagtap	80,698	42.74%	▲2.06
MNS	Devendra Pandurang Gaikwad	2,238	1.19%	▼0.23
NOTA	None of the Above	2,082	1.10%	▲0.38
VBA	Ghag Sanjay Arjun	1,212	0.64%	New
Independent	Chandrakant Sharad Dhondge	1,201	0.64%	New
Margin of victory		21,575	11.43%	▼0.39
Turnout		191,000	67.05%	▼0.50
Total valid votes		188,818		
Registered electors		284,842		▲5.80
SS hold		Swing	▲1.66	

=== Assembly Election 2014 ===
2014 Maharashtra Legislative Assembly election : Mahad
Party	Candidate	Votes	%	±%
SS	Bharatshet Gogawale	94,408	52.50%	▲0.89
INC	Manikrao Motiram Jagtap	73,152	40.68%	New
NCP	Uday Anant Ambonkar	3,258	1.81%	▼41.33
BJP	Sudhir Parshuram Mahadik	3,066	1.71%	New
MNS	Surendra Kashiram Chavan	2,538	1.41%	▼0.12
BSP	Pranay Baliram Sawant	1,307	0.73%	▼0.08
NOTA	None of the Above	1,292	0.72%	New
Margin of victory		21,256	11.82%	▲3.35
Turnout		181,133	67.28%	▼2.16
Total valid votes		179,820		
Registered electors		269,226		▲11.86
SS hold		Swing	▲0.89	

=== Assembly Election 2009 ===
2009 Maharashtra Legislative Assembly election : Mahad
Party	Candidate	Votes	%	±%
SS	Bharatshet Gogawale	85,650	51.61%	▲6.87
NCP	Manikrao Motiram Jagtap	71,600	43.14%	▼4.77
MNS	Kishor Narayan Jadhav	2,540	1.53%	New
Independent	Sondkar Rajendra Ganpat	2,314	1.39%	New
Independent	Mangesh Sudam Tambe	1,334	0.80%	New
BSP	Madhukar Gangaram Gaikwad	1,332	0.80%	▼0.58
Margin of victory		14,050	8.47%	▲5.29
Turnout		165,984	68.97%	▼7.48
Total valid votes		165,959		
Registered electors		240,674		▲54.73
SS gain from NCP		Swing	▲3.69	

=== Assembly Election 2004 ===
2004 Maharashtra Legislative Assembly election : Mahad
Party	Candidate	Votes	%	±%
NCP	Manikrao Motiram Jagtap	56,972	47.92%	▲2.14
SS	Prabhakar Sundarrao More	53,193	44.74%	▼4.50
Independent	Kundan Keru Hate	2,517	2.12%	New
PWPI	Chalke Sopan Namdeo	2,478	2.08%	New
BSP	Deshmukh Prakash Krushnarao	1,644	1.38%	New
Peoples Republican Party	Kasare Santosh Balaram	1,555	1.31%	New
Margin of victory		3,779	3.18%	▼0.28
Turnout		118,980	76.49%	▲10.32
Total valid votes		118,897		
Registered electors		155,545		▲9.58
NCP gain from SS		Swing	▼1.32	

=== Assembly Election 1999 ===
1999 Maharashtra Legislative Assembly election : Mahad
Party	Candidate	Votes	%	±%
SS	Prabhakar Sundarrao More	46,212	49.23%	▲8.00
NCP	Manikrao Motiram Jagtap	42,965	45.77%	New
INC	Jadhav Suresh Dhondiram	4,142	4.41%	▼16.47
Margin of victory		3,247	3.46%	▼16.89
Turnout		97,182	68.46%	▼11.74
Total valid votes		93,862		
Registered electors		141,950		▲9.27
SS hold		Swing	▲8.00	

=== Assembly Election 1995 ===
1995 Maharashtra Legislative Assembly election : Mahad
Party	Candidate	Votes	%	±%
SS	Prabhakar Sundarrao More	41,705	41.23%	▲4.39
INC	Arun Deshmukh	21,123	20.88%	▼12.40
Independent	Adv. Sudhakar Alias Anna Sawant	19,094	18.88%	New
PWPI	Babaji Pawar	8,483	8.39%	New
Independent	Bhosale Baburao Laxumanrao	4,090	4.04%	New
Independent	Lale Subhash Parshuram	1,751	1.73%	New
JD	Dr. Belose Rajaram Govind	1,291	1.28%	▼27.23
Margin of victory		20,582	20.35%	▲16.79
Turnout		104,316	80.30%	▲10.60
Total valid votes		101,153		
Registered electors		129,904		▼0.09
SS hold		Swing	▲4.39	

=== Assembly Election 1990 ===
1990 Maharashtra Legislative Assembly election : Mahad
Party	Candidate	Votes	%	±%
SS	Prabhakar Sundarrao More	32,220	36.84%	New
INC	Adv. Sudhakar Alias Anna Sawant	29,110	33.28%	▼10.30
JD	Philse Shantaram Shivaram	24,937	28.51%	New
Independent	Desai Ratanrao Kahsinathrao	799	0.91%	New
Margin of victory		3,110	3.56%	▲2.65
Turnout		90,099	69.29%	▲0.41
Total valid votes		87,469		
Registered electors		130,027		▲20.69
SS gain from JP		Swing	▼7.64	

=== Assembly Election 1985 ===
1985 Maharashtra Legislative Assembly election : Mahad
Party	Candidate	Votes	%	±%
JP	Shantaram Philse	32,040	44.48%	▲20.04
INC	Adv. Sudhakar Alias Anna Sawant	31,391	43.58%	New
Independent	Arun Deshmukh	3,788	5.26%	New
Independent	Madhukar Gangaram Gaikwad	2,645	3.67%	New
Independent	Sheth Shyamsundar Tikam	1,247	1.73%	New
Independent	Yadav Sirjan Namkuber	921	1.28%	New
Margin of victory		649	0.90%	▼14.50
Turnout		74,469	69.12%	▲9.28
Total valid votes		72,032		
Registered electors		107,736		▲8.01
JP gain from INC(I)		Swing	▲4.64	

=== Assembly Election 1980 ===
1980 Maharashtra Legislative Assembly election : Mahad
Party	Candidate	Votes	%	±%
INC(I)	Chandrakant Khanderao Deshmukh	22,879	39.84%	New
JP	Kishor Pawar	14,035	24.44%	▼35.59
Independent	Shantaram Shivaram Philse	11,658	20.30%	New
INC(U)	Arun Yeshwant Deshmukh	5,742	10.00%	New
Independent	Madhukar Gangaram Gaikwad	3,116	5.43%	New
Margin of victory		8,844	15.40%	▼9.26
Turnout		59,616	59.77%	▼9.10
Total valid votes		57,430		
Registered electors		99,745		▲6.71
INC(I) gain from JP		Swing	▼20.19	

=== Assembly Election 1978 ===
1978 Maharashtra Legislative Assembly election : Mahad
Party	Candidate	Votes	%	±%
JP	Digambar Vinayak	37,413	60.03%	New
INC	Shankar Babaji Alias Dadasaheb Sawant	22,046	35.37%	▼9.31
Independent	Ghatge Pandurang Gangaram	2,867	4.60%	New
Margin of victory		15,367	24.66%	▲14.01
Turnout		65,256	69.81%	▲8.68
Total valid votes		62,326		
Registered electors		93,471		▲8.12
JP gain from SSP		Swing	▲4.71	

=== Assembly Election 1972 ===
1972 Maharashtra Legislative Assembly election : Mahad
Party	Candidate	Votes	%	±%
SSP	Digambar Vinayak	27,737	55.32%	New
INC	Kamal Vichare	22,401	44.68%	▼1.7
Margin of victory		5,336	10.64%	▲7.55
Turnout		52,949	61.25%	▼5.71
Total valid votes		50,138		
Registered electors		86,448		▲10.00
SSP gain from INC		Swing	▲8.94	

=== Assembly Election 1967 ===
1967 Maharashtra Legislative Assembly election : Mahad
Party	Candidate	Votes	%	±%
INC	Shankar Babaji Sawant	23,221	46.38%	▲9.14
PSP	K. R. Pawar	21,672	43.28%	▲6.05
RPI	R. B. More	2,079	4.15%	▼1.87
ABJS	D. B. Parte	1,728	3.45%	▲0.43
Independent	K. S. Salve	1,370	2.74%	New
Margin of victory		1,549	3.09%	▲3.09
Turnout		54,214	68.98%	▲5.23
Total valid votes		50,070		
Registered electors		78,590		▲35.12
INC gain from PSP		Swing	▲9.14	

=== Assembly Election 1962 ===
1962 Maharashtra Legislative Assembly election : Mahad
Party	Candidate	Votes	%	±%
PSP	Sakharam Vithoba Salunke	12,664	37.23%	▼33.17
INC	Shankar Babaji Sawant	12,664	37.23%	▲7.64
Independent	Balaram Govind More	5,608	16.49%	New
RPI	Raghunath Babaji More	2,050	6.03%	New
ABJS	Laxman Babu Malusare	1,027	3.02%	New
Margin of victory				▼40.80
Turnout		36,311	62.43%	▲7.97
Total valid votes		34,013		
Registered electors		58,162		▲8.34
PSP hold		Swing	▼33.17	

=== Assembly Election 1957 ===
1957 Bombay State Legislative Assembly election : Mahad
Party	Candidate	Votes	%	±%
PSP	Purohit Digambar Vinayak	19,091	70.40%	New
INC	Karmarkar Ganesh Anant	8,026	29.60%	New
Margin of victory		11,065	40.80%	
Turnout		27,117	50.51%	
Total valid votes		27,117		
Registered electors		53,684		
PSP win (new seat)				
