= Panditrao =

Panditrao can be a masculine given name or a middle name. Notable people with the name include:

== Given name ==
- Panditrao Agashe (1936–1986), Indian industrialist
- Panditrao Ramrao Deshmukh, Indian politician

== Middle name ==
- Rajesh Panditrao Ekade, Indian politician
- Arjun Panditrao Khotkar (born 1962), Indian politician
- Sudhakar Panditrao Kurdukar (born 1935), Indian judge
