= Jaiprakash Shankarlal Mundada =

Indian politician

DrJaiprakash Mundada

Member of Legislative Assembly of Maharashtra
- In office 2014–2019
- Constituency: Basmath

Minister of Cooperation and Textiles of Maharashtra
- In office 1995–1999

Personal details
- Party: Shiv Sena

Dr. Jaiprakash Shankarlal Mundada is a member of the 13th Maharashtra Legislative Assembly. He represents the Basmath Assembly Constituency in Marathwada, Maharashtra. He belongs to the Shiv Sena (SS).

== Career ==
Mundada is a Medical Doctor MBBS. He was Basmath taluka chief of Shiv Sena in 1987. He was elected to the state assembly from Basmath in 1990. He was textile minister, rehabilitation and minister of cooperatives in the Shiv Sena lead government (1995–99).

== Controversy ==
An inmate of a hostel whose president was Mumdada died of hunger in October, 2008.

== Positions held ==
- 1990: Elected to Maharashtra Legislative Assembly (1st term)
- 1995: Re-elected to Maharashtra Legislative Assembly (2nd term)
- 1995-99: Cabinet Minister of Co-operation and Textiles in Government Of Maharashtra
- 1999: Re-elected to Maharashtra Legislative Assembly (3rd term)
- 2014: Re-elected to Maharashtra Legislative Assembly (4th term)

== See also ==
- Panditrao Ramrao Deshmukh
- Manohar Joshi ministry
- Narayan Rane
