= Prabhakar More =

Prabhakar More may refer to:

- Prabhakar More (politician), Indian politician
- Prabhakar More (actor), Indian actor and comedian
