= Fourth Pawar ministry =

- Ministry of Maharashtra
- Date formed: 6 March 1993
- Date dissolved: 14 March 1995

People and organisations
- Governor: P. C. Alexander
- Chief Minister: Sharad Pawar
- Total no. of members: 19; Congress (17); RPI(A) (1); Independents (1)
- Member parties: Congress; RPI(A); Independents
- Status in legislature: Majority government
- Opposition party: BJP; Shiv Sena
- Opposition leader: Legislative Assembly: Gopinath Munde (BJP); Legislative Council: Anna Dange (BJP) (1993, 1994-95) Sudhir Joshi (Shiv Sena) (1993-94)

History
- Election: 1990
- Legislature term: 5 years
- Predecessor: S. Naik
- Successor: Joshi

Sharad Pawar was sworn in as Chief Minister of Maharashtra for the fourth time on 6 March 1993. On appointment, Pawar formed a 18-member cabinet. The cabinet continued until the 1995 legislative elections, and was replaced by the Manohar Joshi ministry.

== Government formation ==
Soon after the 1990 legislative elections, Pawar, then the incumbent Chief Minister, was sworn in once again. However, after 1991 Indian general election, Pawar resigned and was appointed Defence Minister by P. V. Narasimha Rao. He served as the Member of Parliament for Baramati at the same time. On his resignation, Sudhakarrao Naik was appointed the Chief Minister. However, in 1993, Pawar resigned as the nation's defence minister, and returned as the head of Maharashtra government.

== List of ministers ==
The initial ministry consisted of:

Sr No	Minister	Portfolio	Party
Chief Minister
1	Sharad Pawar	Other Departments not allocated to a minister: Law and Judiciary; Home Affairs; Jails; Planning; General Administration; Information and Public Relations; Information Technology; Command Area Development; State Excise	Congress
Cabinet ministers
2	Ramrao Adik	Finance; Special Assistance; State Border Defence (First)	Congress
3	Shivajirao Deshmukh	Public Works (Excluding Public Undertakings); Parliamentary Affairs; Relief & Rehabilitation; Nomadic Tribes; Majority Welfare Development	Congress
4	Padamsinh Bajirao Patil	Irrigation; Energy; Protocol; Socially And Educationally Backward Classes	Congress
5	Vilasrao Deshmukh	Revenue; Environment and Climate Change; Tourism (18 November 1994 – 14 March 1995); Medical Education; Cultural Affairs; Marathi Language; Earthquake Rehabilitation; State Border Defence (Second)	Congress
6	Surupsingh Hirya Naik	Forest Department; Public Works (Including Public Undertakings); Other Backward Bahujan Welfare	Congress
7	Abhaysinh Raje Bhosale	Cooperation; Disaster Management	Congress
8	Jawaharlal Darda	Industries; Mining Department; Marketing	Congress
9	Chhagan Bhujbal	Housing; Slum Improvement; House Repairs and Reconstruction; Other Backward Classes; Special Backward Classes Welfare	Congress
10	Salim Zakaria	School Education; Fisheries	Congress
11	Pushpatai Hirey	Public Health and Family Welfare; Woman and Child Development	Congress
12	Prabhakar Dharkar	Higher and Technical Education; Employment; Horticulture; Tourism (6 March 1993 – 18 November 1994); Ports; Khar Land Development; Vimukta Jati	Congress
13	Madhukar Pichad	Travel Development; Animal Husbandry and Fisheries; Dairy Development; Tribal Development	Congress
14	Ranjeet Deshmukh	Rural Development; Panchayat Raj; Employment Guarantee Scheme; Ex-Servicemen Welfare	Congress
15	Arun Gujarathi	Urban Development; Skill Development and Entrepreneurship; Food and Drug Administration	Congress
16	Sarawan Parate	Labour; Food and Civil Supplies; Textiles; Minority Development and Aukaf	Congress
17	Ramdas Athawale	Social Welfare; Prohibition Propaganda; Transport; Sports and Youth Welfare	RPI(A)
18	Harshvardhan Deshmukh	Agriculture; Soil and Water Conservation; Water Resources (Krishna Valley Development) and (Konkan Valley Development); Water supply; Sanitation	Independent

=== Ministers of state ===
The junior ministers in the cabinet included:

- Marzban Patrawala, Finance and General Administration
- Ashok Chavan, Public Works, Urban Development, and Parliamentary Affairs
- Avinash Naik, Industries, Tourism, and Environment
- Arun Divekar, Youth Welfare and Sports
- Sadashivrao Dadoba Mandlik, Education, Employment Guarantee Scheme, Rehabilitation
- Eknath Gaikwad, Housing and Slum Development, Labour, and Social Welfare
- Manikrao Thakre, Home Affairs, Agriculture, and Rural Development
- Madhavrao Bhujangrao Kinhalkar, Revenue and Cooperation
