= Yogesh Gholap =

Indian politician

Member of Legislative Assembly of Maharashtra
- In office 2014–2019
- Preceded by: Babanrao Gholap
- Succeeded by: Saroj Ahire
- Constituency: Deolali

Personal details
- Party: Shiv Sena
- Relations: Babanrao Gholap (Father)

Yogesh Gholap is an Indian politician from Nashik district. He is a member of the 13th Maharashtra Legislative Assembly from Deolali Vidhan Sabha constituency from Shiv Sena. He is son of ex minister of Maharashtra and Shiv Sena Deputy Leader Babanrao Gholap.

== Positions held ==
- 2014: Elected to Maharashtra Legislative Assembly

== See also ==
- Nashik Lok Sabha constituency
