= Sudhakarrao Naik ministry =

- Ministry of Maharashtra
- Date formed: 25 June 1991
- Date dissolved: 22 February 1993

People and organisations
- Governor: Chidambaram Subramaniam (1991-93); P. C. Alexander (1993)
- Chief Minister: Sudhakarrao Naik
- Total no. of members: 16 Cabinet ministers (Incl. Chief Minister); 21 Ministers of state
- Member parties: Congress; RPI(A); Independents
- Status in legislature: Majority government
- Opposition party: BJP; Shiv Sena; RPI(G)
- Opposition leader: Legislative Assembly: Gopinath Munde (BJP); Legislative Council: R. S. Gavai (RPI(G)) (1991) Pramod Navalkar (Shiv Sena) (1991-92) Anna Dange (BJP) (1992-93)

History
- Election: 1990
- Legislature term: 5 years
- Predecessor: Pawar III
- Successor: Pawar IV

Sudhakarrao Naik was sworn in as Chief Minister of Maharashtra on 25 June 1991, on resignation of his predecessor Sharad Pawar. The ministry served until February 1993, when Naik resigned due to his inability to handle the 1993 Bombay riots, and was replaced by Pawar.

== List of ministers ==
The ministry initially contained Naik and 7 Cabinet ministers. On 28 June 1991, 8 more cabinet ministers and 21 ministers of state were included in the cabinet. The ministry contained:

Portfolio	Minister	Took office	Left office	Party
Chief Minister: General Administration; Information Technology; Home; Water Resources (Krishna Valley Development) and (Konkan Valley Development); Water supply; sanitation; Protocol Departments; or portfolios not allocated to any minister.	Sudhakarrao Naik	25 June 1991	22 February 1993	INC
Cabinet Minister: Information and Public Relations	Sudhakarrao Naik	25 June 1991	30 December 1991	INC
Cabinet Minister: Information and Public Relations	Shivajirao Deshmukh	30 December 1991	3 September 1992	INC
Cabinet Minister: Information and Public Relations	Ramrao Adik	3 September 1992	22 February 1993	INC
Cabinet Minister: Tourism; Earthquake Rehabilitation; Ports Development	Sudhakarrao Naik	25 June 1991	30 December 1991	INC
Cabinet Minister: Tourism; Earthquake Rehabilitation; Ports Development	Vijaysinh Mohite-Patil	30 December 1991	22 February 1993	INC
Cabinet Minister: Urban Land Ceiling; Mining Department; Public Works; (Including Public Undertakings)	Sudhakarrao Naik	25 June 1991	30 December 1991	INC
Cabinet Minister: Urban Land Ceiling; Mining Department; Public Works; (Including Public Undertakings)	Shankarrao Kolhe	30 December 1991	22 February 1993	INC
Cabinet Minister: Finance; Planning; Food and Drug Administration; Other Backward Classes; Vimukta Jati; Other Backward Bahujan Welfare; Panchayat Raj	Ramrao Adik	25 June 1991	22 February 1993	INC
Cabinet Minister: Irrigation; Energy; Command Area Development; Minority Development and Aukaf	Padamsinh Bajirao Patil	25 June 1991	22 February 1993	INC
Cabinet Minister: Urban Development; Law and Judiciary; Special Assistance; Sports and Youth Welfare; Special Backward Classes Welfare	Sushilkumar Shinde	25 June 1991	22 February 1993	INC
Cabinet Minister: Industries; Rural Development; Marketing	Vilasrao Deshmukh	25 June 1991	22 February 1993	INC
Cabinet Minister: Cooperation; Ex-Servicemen's Welfare; Marathi Language; Socially And Educationally Backward Classes	Shivajirao Deshmukh	25 June 1991	22 February 1993	INC
Cabinet Minister: Parliamentary Affairs	Shivajirao Deshmukh	25 June 1991	22 February 1993	INC
Cabinet Minister: Parliamentary Affairs	Vijaysinh Mohite-Patil	7 September 1992	22 February 1993	INC
Cabinet Minister: Transport	Shivajirao Deshmukh	25 June 1991	26 December 1991	INC
Cabinet Minister: Transport	Shankarrao Kolhe	26 December 1991	22 February 1993	INC
Cabinet Minister: Public Works; (Excluding Public Undertakings)	Vijaysinh Mohite-Patil	25 June 1991	22 February 1993	INC
Cabinet Minister: Excise	Vijaysinh Mohite-Patil	25 June 1991	26 December 1991	INC
Cabinet Minister: Excise	Shankarrao Kolhe	26 December 1991	22 February 1993	INC
Cabinet Minister: Cultural Affairs	Sushilkumar Shinde	25 June 1991	26 December 1991	INC
Cabinet Minister: Cultural Affairs	Vijaysinh Mohite-Patil	26 December 1991	22 February 1993	INC
Cabinet Minister: Social Welfare; Prohibition Propaganda; Employment Guarantee Scheme	Ramdas Athawale	25 June 1991	22 February 1993	RPI(A)
Cabinet Minister: Food and Civil Supplies; Textiles; Environment	Jawaharlal Darda	28 June 1991	22 February 1993	INC
Cabinet Minister: School Education; Higher and Technical Education; Relief & Rehabilitation	Anantrao Thopate	28 June 1991	22 February 1993	INC
Cabinet Minister: Housing; Slum Improvement; House Repairs and Reconstruction	Javed Iqbal Khan	28 June 1991	22 February 1993	INC
Cabinet Minister: Heath and Family Welfare; Medical Education and Drugs; Woman and Child Development	Pushpatai Hirey	28 June 1991	22 February 1993	INC
Cabinet Minister: Revenue; Khar Land Development; Majority Welfare Development	Shankarrao Kolhe	28 June 1991	26 December 1991	INC
Cabinet Minister: Revenue; Khar Land Development; Majority Welfare Development	Chhagan Bhujbal	26 December 1991	22 February 1993	INC
Cabinet Minister: Agriculture; Horticulture; Labour; Employment; Skill Development and Entrepreneurship	Rohidas Patil	28 June 1991	22 February 1993	INC
Cabinet Minister: Forests; Social Forestry	Madhukarrao Pichad	28 June 1991	2 November 1992	INC
Cabinet Minister: Forests; Social Forestry	Shankarrao Kolhe	2 November 1992	22 February 1993	INC
Cabinet Minister: Tribal Development; Nomadic Tribes	Madhukarrao Pichad	28 June 1991	2 November 1992	INC
Cabinet Minister: Tribal Development; Nomadic Tribes	Sudhakarrao Naik	2 November 1992	22 February 1993	INC
Cabinet Minister: Animal Husbandry; Dairy Development; Fisheries	Vilarsao Patil	28 June 1991	22 February 1993	INC
Cabinet Minister: Jails; Disaster Management; Soil and Water Conservation	Sudhakarrao Naik	25 June 1991	30 December 1991	INC
Cabinet Minister: Jails; Disaster Management; Soil and Water Conservation	Arun Mehta	30 December 1991	22 February 1993	INC
