= Deolali Assembly constituency =

Constituency of the Maharashtra legislative assembly in India

Coordinates: 19.90°N 73.83°E

Deolali
- Constituency No. 126 for the Maharashtra Legislative Assembly

Constituency details
- Country: India
- Region: Western India
- State: Maharashtra
- District: Nashik
- Lok Sabha constituency: Nashik
- Established: 1967
- Total electors: 288,816
- Reservation: SC

Member of Legislative Assembly
- 15th Maharashtra Legislative Assembly
- Incumbent Saroj Babulal Ahire
- Party: NCP
- Alliance: NDA
- Elected year: 2024

Deolali Assembly constituency (formerly Devlali) is one of the 288 constituencies of the Vidhan Sabha (Assembly) of Maharashtra state in Western India. It is located in the Nashik district, and is one of the six assembly segments under Nashik (Lok Sabha constituency).

== Members of Assembly ==
| Year | Member | Party |
|---|---|---|
| 1967 | Shankarrao Deshmukh | Indian National Congress |
| 1972 | Nivruttirao Gaidhani | Independent |
| 1978 | Babulal Ahire | Independent |
| 1980 | Babulal Ahire | Indian National Congress (U) |
| 1985 | Bhikchand Donde | Bharatiya Janata Party |
| 1990 | Babanrao Gholap | Shiv Sena |
| 1995 | Babanrao Gholap | Shiv Sena |
| 1999 | Babanrao Gholap | Shiv Sena |
| 2004 | Babanrao Gholap | Shiv Sena |
| 2009 | Babanrao Gholap | Shiv Sena |
| 2014 | Yogesh Gholap | Shiv Sena |
| 2019 | Saroj Ahire | Nationalist Congress Party |
| 2024 | Saroj Ahire | Nationalist Congress Party |

== Election results ==
=== Assembly Election 2024 ===
2024 Maharashtra Legislative Assembly election : Deolali
| Party | Candidate | Votes | % | ±% |
|---|---|---|---|---|
| NCP | Saroj Babulal Ahire | 81,683 | 44.83 | New |
| SHS | Dr. Ahirrao Rajashri Tahasildartai | 41,004 | 22.50 | ▼7.11 |
| SS(UBT) | Yogesh Gholap | 39,027 | 21.42 | New |
| VBA | Dr. Avinash Niranjan Shinde | 11,831 | 6.49 | ▲0.08 |
| MNS | Jadhav Mohini Gokul | 3,931 | 2.16 | ▼0.06 |
| NOTA | None of the Above | 1,406 | 0.77 | ▼0.09 |
| Margin of victory | | 40,679 | 22.32 | ▼6.65 |
| Turnout | | 183,627 | 63.58 | ▲8.76 |
| Total valid votes | | 182,221 | | |
| Registered electors | | 288,816 | | ▲9.04 |
| NCP hold | | Swing | ▼13.76 | |

=== Assembly Election 2019 ===
2019 Maharashtra Legislative Assembly election : Deolali
| Party | Candidate | Votes | % | ±% |
|---|---|---|---|---|
| NCP | Saroj Babulal Ahire | 84,326 | 58.59 | ▲44.58 |
| SS | Yogesh Gholap | 42,624 | 29.62 | ▼8.26 |
| VBA | Gautam Sukdeo Wagh | 9,223 | 6.41 | New |
| MNS | Siddhant Laxman Mandale | 3,198 | 2.22 | ▼9.20 |
| BSP | Amol Changdeo Pathade | 1,476 | 1.03 | ▼0.96 |
| NOTA | None of the Above | 1,241 | 0.86 | ▼0.12 |
| Margin of victory | | 41,702 | 28.98 | ▲7.53 |
| Turnout | | 145,270 | 54.85 | ▲0.52 |
| Total valid votes | | 143,924 | | |
| Registered electors | | 264,873 | | ▲8.53 |
| NCP gain from SS | | Swing | ▲20.71 | |

=== Assembly Election 2014 ===
2014 Maharashtra Legislative Assembly election : Deolali
| Party | Candidate | Votes | % | ±% |
|---|---|---|---|---|
| SS | Yogesh Gholap | 49,751 | 37.88 | ▼0.85 |
| BJP | Sadaphule Ramdas Dayaram (Baba) | 21,580 | 16.43 | New |
| NCP | Nitin Nivrutti Mohite | 18,402 | 14.01 | ▼16.15 |
| MNS | Mehrolia Pratap Rohtash | 15,001 | 11.42 | ▼7.86 |
| INC | Unavane Ganesh Sukdeo | 9,115 | 6.94 | New |
| Independent | Londhe Prakash Mogal | 8,589 | 6.54 | New |
| BSP | Dhiware Jaipal Pralhad | 2,609 | 1.99 | ▲0.71 |
| NOTA | None of the Above | 1,288 | 0.98 | New |
| Margin of victory | | 28,171 | 21.45 | ▲12.88 |
| Turnout | | 132,668 | 54.36 | ▲0.56 |
| Total valid votes | | 131,348 | | |
| Registered electors | | 244,051 | | ▲10.00 |
| SS hold | | Swing | ▼0.85 | |

=== Assembly Election 2009 ===
2009 Maharashtra Legislative Assembly election : Deolali
| Party | Candidate | Votes | % | ±% |
|---|---|---|---|---|
| SS | Babanrao Gholap | 45,761 | 38.73 | ▼10.21 |
| NCP | Nanasaheb Sampatrao Sonawane | 35,641 | 30.16 | ▼15.56 |
| MNS | Vairagar Raju Laxman | 22,783 | 19.28 | New |
| BBM | Dr. Jadhav Sanjay Damu | 5,511 | 4.66 | New |
| Independent | Bhalerao Nanasaheb Baburao | 2,338 | 1.98 | New |
| RPI(A) | Sunil Sampat Kambale | 2,248 | 1.90 | New |
| BSP | Rokade Manojkumar Nana | 1,512 | 1.28 | ▼2.11 |
| Margin of victory | | 10,120 | 8.56 | ▲5.35 |
| Turnout | | 118,160 | 53.26 | ▲7.82 |
| Total valid votes | | 118,159 | | |
| Registered electors | | 221,855 | | ▼42.16 |
| SS hold | | Swing | ▼10.21 | |

=== Assembly Election 2004 ===
2004 Maharashtra Legislative Assembly election : Deolali
| Party | Candidate | Votes | % | ±% |
|---|---|---|---|---|
| SS | Babanrao Gholap | 85,297 | 48.94 | New |
| NCP | Sadaphule Ramdas Dayaram (Baba) | 79,695 | 45.72 | ▲1.68 |
| BSP | Mohite Kiran Baburao | 5,907 | 3.39 | New |
| IJP | Tayade (Madam) Manaswi Milind | 1,490 | 0.85 | New |
| LJP | Ghule Tukaram Sarjerao | 1,221 | 0.70 | New |
| Margin of victory | | 5,602 | 3.21 | ▲0.24 |
| Turnout | | 174,321 | 45.44 | ▲1.25 |
| Total valid votes | | 174,303 | | |
| Registered electors | | 383,594 | | ▲35.87 |
| SS gain from Independent | | Swing | ▲1.92 | |

=== Assembly Election 1999 ===
1999 Maharashtra Legislative Assembly election : Deolali
| Party | Candidate | Votes | % | ±% |
|---|---|---|---|---|
| Independent | Babanrao Gholap | 58,657 | 47.01 | New |
| NCP | Sadaphule Ramdas Dayaram (Baba) | 54,949 | 44.04 | New |
| BBM | Pawar Vilas Sitaram | 7,016 | 5.62 | New |
| Independent | Adv. Arvind Haribhau Pathade | 1,370 | 1.10 | New |
| Independent | Bhagwat Laxman Kanade | 885 | 0.71 | New |
| Margin of victory | | 3,708 | 2.97 | ▼19.40 |
| Turnout | | 133,020 | 47.11 | ▼15.86 |
| Total valid votes | | 124,765 | | |
| Registered electors | | 282,334 | | ▲2.76 |
| Independent gain from SS | | Swing | ▼0.47 | |

=== Assembly Election 1995 ===
1995 Maharashtra Legislative Assembly election : Deolali
| Party | Candidate | Votes | % | ±% |
|---|---|---|---|---|
| SS | Babanrao Gholap | 78,339 | 47.48 | ▼9.35 |
| INC | Kale Vishawanath Madhavrao | 41,420 | 25.10 | New |
| Independent | Sadaphule Ramdas Dayaram (Baba) | 30,205 | 18.31 | New |
| JD | Katare Annasheb Namdeo | 3,670 | 2.22 | ▼0.57 |
| Independent | Karade Kamlesh Ramnath | 3,509 | 2.13 | New |
| RPI | Dangle Arjun Thamaji | 2,218 | 1.34 | New |
| Independent | Salunke Nandkumar Trimbak | 1,577 | 0.96 | New |
| Margin of victory | | 36,919 | 22.38 | ▼11.94 |
| Turnout | | 169,713 | 61.77 | ▲12.52 |
| Total valid votes | | 164,988 | | |
| Registered electors | | 274,760 | | ▲38.97 |
| SS hold | | Swing | ▼9.35 | |

=== Assembly Election 1990 ===
1990 Maharashtra Legislative Assembly election : Deolali
| Party | Candidate | Votes | % | ±% |
|---|---|---|---|---|
| SS | Babanrao Gholap | 53,400 | 56.83 | New |
| Independent | Sadaphule Ramdas Dayaram (Baba) | 21,153 | 22.51 | New |
| Independent | Nikam Dadubhau Nanaji | 8,913 | 9.49 | New |
| JD | Bhalerao Chandrakant Waman | 2,629 | 2.80 | New |
| Independent | Donde Shankuntala Bhikchand | 1,418 | 1.51 | New |
| Independent | Dive Ashok Namdeo | 1,202 | 1.28 | New |
| INS(SCS) | Tank Charansinha Ratanlal | 1,171 | 1.25 | New |
| Margin of victory | | 32,247 | 34.32 | ▲27.86 |
| Turnout | | 95,098 | 48.10 | ▲1.70 |
| Total valid votes | | 93,968 | | |
| Registered electors | | 197,710 | | ▲37.72 |
| SS gain from BJP | | Swing | ▲21.51 | |

=== Assembly Election 1985 ===
1985 Maharashtra Legislative Assembly election : Deolali
| Party | Candidate | Votes | % | ±% |
|---|---|---|---|---|
| BJP | Donde Bhikchand Haribhau | 23,235 | 35.32 | New |
| INC | Sathe Ranchandra Ganpat | 18,986 | 28.86 | New |
| Independent | Ahire Babulal Soma | 8,696 | 13.22 | New |
| Independent | Gangurde Shailendra Damodar | 4,985 | 7.58 | New |
| Independent | Jagtap Madhukar Bhagwat | 3,034 | 4.61 | New |
| Independent | Gholap Baban Shankar | 2,774 | 4.22 | New |
| RPI(K) | Barve Bhaskar Shivram | 2,411 | 3.66 | New |
| Margin of victory | | 4,249 | 6.46 | ▼11.80 |
| Turnout | | 66,731 | 46.48 | ▲1.46 |
| Total valid votes | | 65,790 | | |
| Registered electors | | 143,560 | | ▲15.20 |
| BJP gain from INC(U) | | Swing | ▼16.90 | |

=== Assembly Election 1980 ===
1980 Maharashtra Legislative Assembly election : Deolali
| Party | Candidate | Votes | % | ±% |
|---|---|---|---|---|
| INC(U) | Ahire Babulal Soma | 28,876 | 52.22 | New |
| INC(I) | Mohekar Hiraman Chataru | 18,778 | 33.96 | New |
| Independent | Khobragade Kisan Raybhan | 3,856 | 6.97 | New |
| Independent | Reporte Baburao Bhagaji | 1,419 | 2.57 | New |
| Independent | Divekar Chandan Nanaji | 917 | 1.66 | New |
| PWPI | Kanade Bhagwant Laxman | 355 | 0.64 | New |
| Margin of victory | | 10,098 | 18.26 | ▼18.77 |
| Turnout | | 56,210 | 45.10 | ▼13.56 |
| Total valid votes | | 55,296 | | |
| Registered electors | | 124,621 | | ▲15.57 |
| INC(U) gain from Independent | | Swing | ▼8.32 | |

=== Assembly Election 1978 ===
1978 Maharashtra Legislative Assembly election : Deolali
| Party | Candidate | Votes | % | ±% |
|---|---|---|---|---|
| Independent | Ahire Babulal Soma | 37,821 | 60.54 | New |
| RPI | Reporte Baburao Bhagaji | 14,688 | 23.51 | ▲3.91 |
| Independent | Ohol Sadashiv Gopal | 5,207 | 8.34 | New |
| Independent | Mohekar Hiraman Chatru | 1,720 | 2.75 | New |
| Independent | Narayane Bhagwan Keshao | 660 | 1.06 | New |
| Independent | Sathe Ramchandra Gampat | 552 | 0.88 | New |
| Independent | Sansane Pandit Baburao | 398 | 0.64 | New |
| Margin of victory | | 23,133 | 37.03 | ▲31.22 |
| Turnout | | 64,163 | 59.50 | ▼1.97 |
| Total valid votes | | 62,468 | | |
| Registered electors | | 107,831 | | ▲50.09 |
| Independent hold | | Swing | ▲18.20 | |

=== Assembly Election 1972 ===
1972 Maharashtra Legislative Assembly election : Deolali
| Party | Candidate | Votes | % | ±% |
|---|---|---|---|---|
| Independent | Nivruttirao B. Gaidhani | 18,224 | 42.35 | New |
| INC | Shankarrao N. Deshmukh | 15,723 | 36.54 | ▼7.04 |
| RPI | Gitabai B. Gaikwad | 8,437 | 19.61 | ▼4.98 |
| Margin of victory | | 2,501 | 5.81 | ▼10.04 |
| Turnout | | 44,201 | 61.52 | ▼4.53 |
| Total valid votes | | 43,033 | | |
| Registered electors | | 71,845 | | ▲15.97 |
| Independent gain from INC | | Swing | ▼1.23 | |

=== Assembly Election 1967 ===
1967 Maharashtra Legislative Assembly election : Deolali
| Party | Candidate | Votes | % | ±% |
|---|---|---|---|---|
| INC | S. N. Deshmukh | 17,394 | 43.58 | New |
| Independent | V. T. Aringale | 11,066 | 27.72 | New |
| RPI | S. D. Dani | 9,814 | 24.59 | New |
| Independent | M. R. Joshi | 1,640 | 4.11 | New |
| Margin of victory | | 6,328 | 15.85 | |
| Turnout | | 43,016 | 69.44 | |
| Total valid votes | | 39,914 | | |
| Registered electors | | 61,951 | | |
| INC win (new seat) | | | | |
