= Basmath Assembly constituency =

Constituency of the Maharashtra legislative assembly in India

Coordinates: 19°20′0.59″N 77°9′25.65″E

Basmath
- Constituency No. 92 for the Maharashtra Legislative Assembly

Constituency details
- Country: India
- Region: Western India
- State: Maharashtra
- District: Hingoli
- Lok Sabha constituency: Hingoli
- Established: 1952
- Total electors: 321,014
- Reservation: None

Member of Legislative Assembly
- 15th Maharashtra Legislative Assembly
- Incumbent Chandrakant Nawghare
- Party: NCP
- Alliance: NDA
- Elected year: 2024

Basmath Assembly constituency is one of the 288 constituencies of the Maharashtra Legislative Assembly, in Maharashtra, India.

== Overview ==
Basmath (constituency number 92) is one of the three Vidhan Sabha constituencies located in Hingoli district. It covers the entire Basmath tehsil and part of Aundha tehsil of this district.

Basmath is part of the Hingoli Lok Sabha constituency along with five other Vidhan Sabha segments, namely Kalamnuri and Hingoli in Hingoli district and Umarkhed in Yavatmal district, Kinwat and Hadgaon in Nanded district.

== Members of the Legislative Assembly ==
Election	Member	Party
1952	Bhagwan Rao	Peasants and Workers Party of India
1952	Sham Rao	Scheduled Castes Federation
1957	Vishwanathrao S/o Madhaorao	Indian National Congress
1962	Rangrao Parashram	Indian National Congress
1967	W. R. Nayak	Indian National Congress
1972	S. Iqbal Hussain	Indian National Congress
1978	Panditrao Ramrao Deshmukh	Janata Party
1980	Ganeshrao Dudhgaonkar	Indian National Congress (I)
1985	Jadhav Munjajirao Narayanrao	Indian National Congress
1990	Dr. Jaiprakash Shankarlal Mundada	Shiv Sena
1995	Dr. Jaiprakash Shankarlal Mundada	Shiv Sena
1999	Dr. Jaiprakash Shankarlal Mundada	Shiv Sena
2004	Jayprakash R. Salunke Dandegaonkar	Nationalist Congress Party
2009	Jayprakash R. Salunke Dandegaonkar	Nationalist Congress Party
2014	Dr. Jaiprakash Shankarlal Mundada	Shiv Sena
2019	Chandrakant Nawghare	Nationalist Congress Party
2024	Chandrakant Nawghare	Nationalist Congress Party

== Election results ==
=== Assembly Election 2024 ===
2024 Maharashtra Legislative Assembly election : Basmath
Party	Candidate	Votes	%	±%
NCP	Chandrakant Nawghare	107,655	44.67%	New
NCP-SP	Jayprakash Raosaheb Salunke Dandegaonkar	78,067	32.39%	New
JSS	Gurupadeshwar Shivacharya Maharaj (Bapu)	35,219	14.61%	New
VBA	Jaiswal Priti Manoj	14,027	5.82%	▼5.95
Independent	Jagannath Limbaji Adkine	2,764	1.15%	New
NOTA	None of the above	1,423	0.59%	▼0.32
Margin of victory		29,588	12.28%	▲8.46
Turnout		242,420	75.52%	▲1.00
Total valid votes		240,997		
Registered electors		321,014		▲9.82
Nationalist Congress Party (post–2023) gain from NCP		Swing	▲9.76	

=== Assembly Election 2019 ===
2019 Maharashtra Legislative Assembly election : Basmath
Party	Candidate	Votes	%	±%
NCP	Chandrakant Nawghare	75,321	34.91%	▲5.72
Independent	Adv. Shivaji Munjajirao Jadhav	67,070	31.08%	New
SS	Jaiprakash Shankarlal Mundada	41,557	19.26%	▼12.72
VBA	Shaikh Farid Alias Munir Isak Patel	25,397	11.77%	New
NOTA	None of the above	1,957	0.91%	▲0.43
Margin of victory		8,251	3.82%	▲1.04
Turnout		217,819	74.52%	▼1.67
Total valid votes		215,776		
Registered electors		292,304		▲10.97
NCP gain from SS		Swing	▲2.93	

=== Assembly Election 2014 ===
2014 Maharashtra Legislative Assembly election : Basmath
Party	Candidate	Votes	%	±%
SS	Jaiprakash Shankarlal Mundada	63,851	31.98%	▼12.05
NCP	Jayprakash R. Salunke Dandegaonkar	58,295	29.19%	▼16.43
BJP	Adv. Jadhav Shivajirao Munjajirao	51,197	25.64%	New
INC	Abdul Hafiz Abdul Raheman	13,325	6.67%	New
BBM	Adv. Iptekhar M. Jabbar Shaikh	3,956	1.98%	▲1.28
Independent	Jadhav Shivaji Laxmanrao	2,501	1.25%	New
BMP	Gite Minakshi Gangadhar	1,797	0.90%	New
BSP	Khaja Jahangir Shaikh	1,670	0.84%	▼0.83
NOTA	None of the above	962	0.48%	New
Margin of victory		5,556	2.78%	▲1.19
Turnout		200,692	76.19%	▲0.99
Total valid votes		199,687		
Registered electors		263,398		▲11.08
SS gain from NCP		Swing	▼13.64	

=== Assembly Election 2009 ===
2009 Maharashtra Legislative Assembly election : Basmath
Party	Candidate	Votes	%	±%
NCP	Jayprakash R. Salunke Dandegaonkar	81,357	45.62%	▼0.85
SS	Jaiprakash Shankarlal Mundada	78,513	44.03%	▼2.26
Independent	Tambhale Ujjwalatai Vijayprakash	9,059	5.08%	New
BSP	Shaikh Shakir Mujahade Ismail	2,983	1.67%	▼0.96
Independent	Krantisinha Adv. Subhashrao Shinde (Patil)	1,538	0.86%	New
SBP	Deviprasad Munjaji Dhobale	1,527	0.86%	New
BBM	Adv. Sadawarte Deepak Kishanrao	1,250	0.70%	New
Margin of victory		2,844	1.59%	▲1.41
Turnout		178,326	75.20%	▼3.31
Total valid votes		178,323		
Registered electors		237,126		▲6.85
NCP hold		Swing	▼0.85	

=== Assembly Election 2004 ===
2004 Maharashtra Legislative Assembly election : Basmath
Party	Candidate	Votes	%	±%
NCP	Jayprakash R. Salunke Dandegaonkar	80,935	46.47%	▲14.61
SS	Dr. Jaiprakash Shankarlal Mundada	80,627	46.29%	▼4.79
BSP	Prof. Lute Vilas Vithalrao	4,583	2.63%	New
Independent	Adv. Sadawarte Deepak Kishanrao	2,618	1.50%	New
Independent	D. G. Naikwade	1,474	0.85%	New
Independent	Shelke Dyaneshwar Topaji	1,175	0.67%	New
Margin of victory		308	0.18%	▼19.04
Turnout		174,235	78.51%	▲4.14
Total valid votes		174,177		
Registered electors		221,918		▲15.39
NCP gain from SS		Swing	▼4.61	

=== Assembly Election 1999 ===
1999 Maharashtra Legislative Assembly election : Basmath
Party	Candidate	Votes	%	±%
SS	Dr. Jaiprakash Shankarlal Mundada	69,481	51.08%	▲14.56
NCP	Salunke Jayprakash Dandegaonkar	43,331	31.86%	New
Independent	Nadre Sopanrao Begaji	19,399	14.26%	New
Independent	Pisal Maroti Narayanrao	3,651	2.68%	New
Margin of victory		26,150	19.22%	▲0.07
Turnout		143,021	74.37%	▼8.23
Total valid votes		136,023		
Registered electors		192,317		▲5.53
SS hold		Swing	▲14.56	

=== Assembly Election 1995 ===
1995 Maharashtra Legislative Assembly election : Basmath
Party	Candidate	Votes	%	±%
SS	Dr. Jaiprakash Shankarlal Mundada	53,518	36.52%	▼13.25
Independent	Dr. Chavan Prabhakar Eknath	25,453	17.37%	New
BBM	Pisal Maroti Narayanrao	25,212	17.20%	New
JD	S. Karamat Husain Urf Javed Vilayat Hussain	14,883	10.16%	▼19.03
Independent	Dandegaonkar Jayprakash Raosaheb Salunke	14,261	9.73%	New
INC	Bagal Sakharam Begaji (Pardikar)	9,431	6.43%	▼11.80
Margin of victory		28,065	19.15%	▼1.43
Turnout		150,535	82.60%	▲16.30
Total valid votes		146,558		
Registered electors		182,235		▲8.06
SS hold		Swing	▼13.25	

=== Assembly Election 1990 ===
1990 Maharashtra Legislative Assembly election : Basmath
Party	Candidate	Votes	%	±%
SS	Dr. Jaiprakash Shankarlal Mundada	54,498	49.77%	New
JD	Bagal Ramchandra Khobraji	31,959	29.19%	New
INC	Jadhav Munjajirao Narayanrao	19,963	18.23%	▼29.41
Independent	Jadhav Kamalabai Bhagwanrao	1,337	1.22%	New
Margin of victory		22,539	20.58%	▲6.91
Turnout		111,810	66.30%	▲17.00
Total valid votes		109,498		
Registered electors		168,635		▲29.85
SS gain from INC		Swing	▲2.13	

=== Assembly Election 1985 ===
1985 Maharashtra Legislative Assembly election : Basmath
Party	Candidate	Votes	%	±%
INC	Jadhav Munjajirao Narayanrao	29,698	47.64%	New
JP	Panditrao Ramrao Deshmukh	21,176	33.97%	New
Independent	Dudhmal Megnath Narayan	9,157	14.69%	New
CPI	Lolage Sudarshanrao Namdeorao	1,760	2.82%	New
Independent	Manjaramkar Madhukar Dashrathrao	543	0.87%	New
Margin of victory		8,522	13.67%	▲10.66
Turnout		64,021	49.30%	▼3.04
Total valid votes		62,334		
Registered electors		129,868		▲8.13
INC gain from INC(I)		Swing	▲12.55	

=== Assembly Election 1980 ===
1980 Maharashtra Legislative Assembly election : Basmath
Party	Candidate	Votes	%	±%
INC(I)	Ganeshrao Dudhgaonkar	21,548	35.09%	▲23.05
JP	Panditrao Ramrao Deshmukh	19,697	32.08%	New
RPI(K)	Telgote Randhir Sharawan	10,263	16.71%	New
BJP	Deshmukh Laxumanrao Nagorao	5,108	8.32%	New
INC(U)	Gaikwad Balasaheb Venkatrao	4,456	7.26%	New
Margin of victory		1,851	3.01%	▼12.25
Turnout		62,864	52.34%	▼5.40
Total valid votes		61,408		
Registered electors		120,102		▲8.49
INC(I) gain from JP		Swing	▼6.23	

=== Assembly Election 1978 ===
1978 Maharashtra Legislative Assembly election : Basmath
Party	Candidate	Votes	%	±%
JP	Panditrao Ramrao Deshmukh	25,583	41.32%	New
INC	Kusale Narayanrao Girjaji	16,135	26.06%	▼33.13
INC(I)	Rathod Ramrao Bhojaji	7,454	12.04%	New
PWPI	Amrat Bharti Shankar Bharti	4,850	7.83%	▼30.77
Independent	Shelke Laxman Gangaram	3,149	5.09%	New
Independent	Engade Jairam Pundlikrao	3,053	4.93%	New
Independent	Deshai Tikaram Narayan	746	1.20%	New
Independent	Waijwade Yamunbai Vishwanthrao	535	0.86%	New
Margin of victory		9,448	15.26%	▲4.13
Turnout		63,921	57.74%	▲20.25
Total valid votes		61,911		
Registered electors		110,699		▲9.42
JP gain from INC		Swing	▼8.40	

=== Assembly Election 1972 ===
1972 Maharashtra Legislative Assembly election : Basmath
Party	Candidate	Votes	%	±%
INC	S. Iqbal Hussain	18,308	49.72%	▲3.10
PWPI	V. Katneshwarkar	14,211	38.60%	▲23.08
INC	Engne Jairam	3,487	9.47%	▼37.15
RPI(K)	Gajabhar Janardhan	454	1.23%	New
Independent	Parkar Laxman	291	0.79%	New
Margin of victory		4,097	11.13%	▼12.86
Turnout		37,927	37.49%	▼2.84
Total valid votes		36,820		
Registered electors		101,172		▲14.08
INC hold		Swing	▲3.10	

=== Assembly Election 1967 ===
1967 Maharashtra Legislative Assembly election : Basmath
Party	Candidate	Votes	%	±%
INC	W. R. Nayak	15,541	46.62%	▼16.56
Independent	V. M. Katneshwar	7,542	22.62%	New
PWPI	S. S. Ahir	5,173	15.52%	▼5.90
Independent	M. D. Nirlikir	1,898	5.69%	New
Independent	S. S. Telgote	1,471	4.41%	New
ABJS	H. L. Muley	914	2.74%	New
Independent	D. T. Dalvi	431	1.29%	New
Margin of victory		7,999	23.99%	▼17.77
Turnout		35,770	40.33%	▲2.78
Total valid votes		33,339		
Registered electors		88,689		▲33.58
INC hold		Swing	▼16.56	

=== Assembly Election 1962 ===
1962 Maharashtra Legislative Assembly election : Basmath
Party	Candidate	Votes	%	±%
INC	Rangrao Parashram	14,847	63.18%	▲11.04
PWPI	Kamaji Jalbaji	5,034	21.42%	▼26.44
Independent	Madhavrao Deoba	1,895	8.06%	New
Independent	Abdul Razzak Shaik Daut	1,005	4.28%	New
Independent	Anantrao Nagorao	720	3.06%	New
Margin of victory		9,813	41.76%	▲37.49
Turnout		24,934	37.55%	▲0.03
Total valid votes		23,501		
Registered electors		66,395		▲12.35
INC hold		Swing	▲11.04	

=== Assembly Election 1957 ===
1957 Bombay State Legislative Assembly election : Basmath
Party	Candidate	Votes	%	±%
INC	Vishwanathrao S/o Madhaorao	11,561	52.14%	▲25.02
PWPI	Rangrao S/o Parasram	10,614	47.86%	▲19.48
Margin of victory		947	4.27%	▼9.99
Turnout		22,175	37.52%	▼27.43
Total valid votes		22,175		
Registered electors		59,094		▼36.75
INC gain from PWPI		Swing	▲23.76	

=== Assembly Election 1952 ===
1952 Hyderabad State Legislative Assembly election : Basmath
Party	Candidate	Votes	%	±%
PWPI	Bhagwan Rao	17,218	28.38%	New
SCF	Sham Rao	11,096	18.29%	New
INC	Tukaram	8,565	14.12%	New
PDF	Dattopant	8,271	13.63%	New
INC	Vishwanath Rao	7,893	13.01%	New
Socialist	Raja Ram Etarajaloo	2,705	4.46%	New
RRP	Narhar Rao	2,464	4.06%	New
Hyderabad State Depressed Classes Association	Chokhoba	2,463	4.06%	New
Margin of victory		8,653	14.26%	
Turnout		60,675	32.84%	
Total valid votes		60,675		
Registered electors		93,422		
PWPI win (new seat)				

== See also ==
- Basmath
- List of constituencies of Maharashtra Vidhan Sabha
