= Anna Dange =

Indian politician

Minister of Rural Development Government of Maharashtra
- In office 14 March 1995 – 18 October 1999
- Chief Minister: Manohar Joshi; Narayan Rane
- Preceded by: Ranjeet Deshmukh
- Succeeded by: R. R. Patil

Leader of the Opposition Maharashtra Legislative Council
- In office 30 July 1994 – 18 March 1995
- Chief Minister: Sharad Pawar
- Preceded by: Sudhir Joshi
- Succeeded by: Sharad Pawar
- In office 2 July 1992 – 30 July 1993
- Chief Minister: Sudhakarrao Naik; Sharad Pawar
- Preceded by: Pramod Navalkar
- Succeeded by: Sudhir Joshi

Member of Maharashtra Legislative Council
- In office 25 April 1984 – 24 April 2002
- Constituency: elected by Members of Legislative Assembly

Personal details
- Party: Bharatiya Janata Party (2025 - present) (till 2002); Nationalist Congress Party (2006-2025); Lok Rajya Party (2002-06)
- Profession: Politician

Ramchandra Dange alias Anna Dange was an Indian politician and member of the Nationalist Congress Party. Dange is a member of the Bharatiya Janata Party and also minister of Rural Development, Water supply, Retired Servicemen welfare in Manohar Joshi's ministry from 1995 to 1999 as well as minister in Narayan Rane's ministry

He quit the Bharatiya Janata Party in 2002 after he was repeatedly sidelined and ill treated by his fellow party members. He floated his new party called Lokrajya Party in 2006

In 2006, he joined Nationalist Congress Party and was named Vice-President of the Maharashtra State NCP in June 2011.
