= Poladpur Mahad Assembly constituency =

Constituency of the Maharashtra legislative assembly in India

Poladpur Mahad
- Former constituency for the Maharashtra Legislative Assembly

Constituency details
- Country: India
- Region: Western India
- State: Maharashtra
- Established: 1951
- Abolished: 1955
- Total electors: 43,892
- Reservation: None

Poladpur Mahad Assembly constituency was an assembly constituency in the India state of Maharashtra.

== Members of the Legislative Assembly ==
Election	Member	Party
1952	Purohit Digambar Vinayak Nanasaheb	Socialist Party

== Election results ==
=== Assembly Election 1952 ===
1952 Bombay State Legislative Assembly election : Poladpur Mahad
Party	Candidate	Votes	%	±%
Socialist	Purohit Digambar Vinayak	13,597	68.63%	New
INC	Deshmukh Pandurang Khashaba	6,214	31.37%	New
Margin of victory		7,383	37.27%	
Turnout		19,811	45.14%	
Total valid votes		19,811		
Registered electors		43,892		
Socialist win (new seat)				
