= Bharatshet Gogawale =

Indian politician

Bharatsheth Gogawale
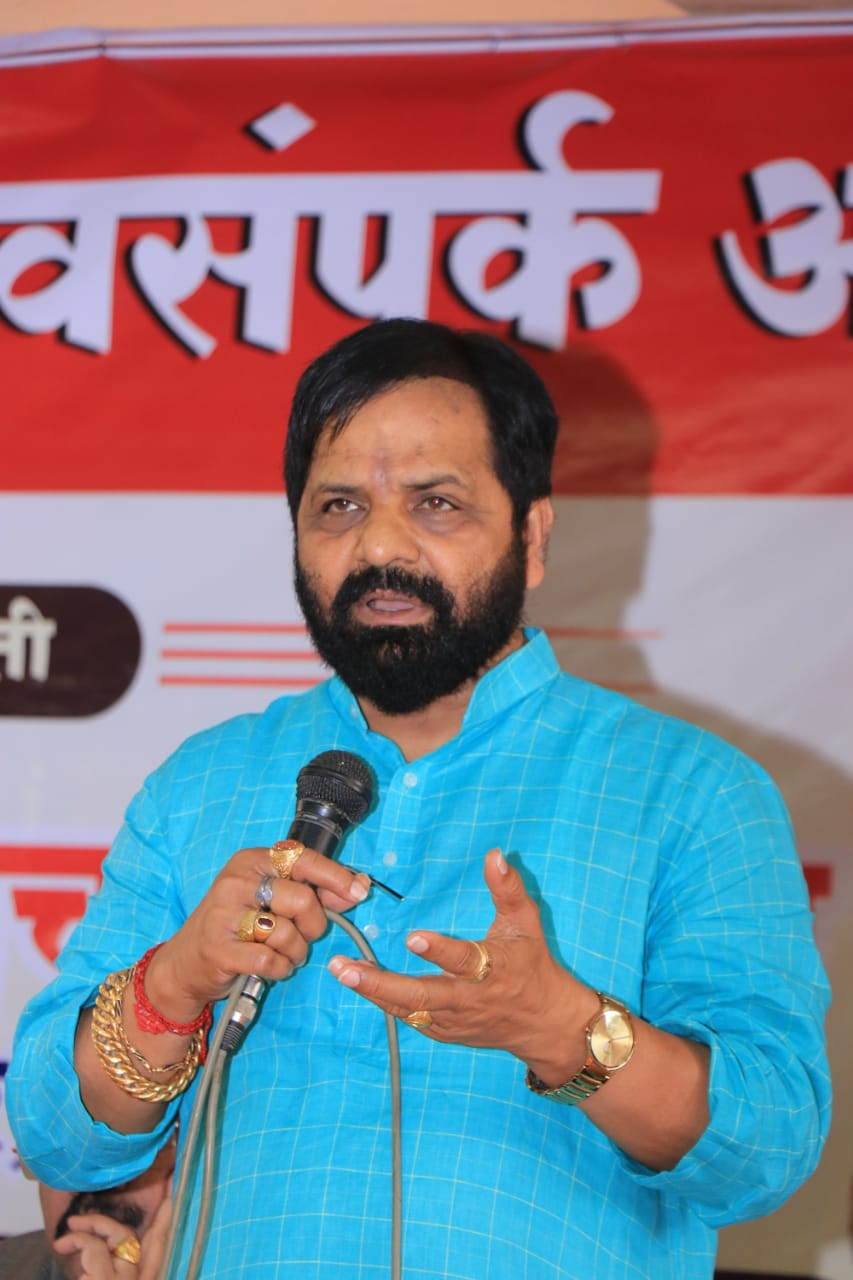

Cabinet Minister Government of Maharashtra
- Incumbent
- Assumed office 15 December 2024
- Minister: Horticulture; Employment Guarantee; Khar Land Development
- Governor: C. P. Radhakrishnan; Acharya Devvrat additional charge
- Cabinet: Third Fadnavis ministry
- Chief Minister: Devendra Fadnavis
- Deputy CM: Eknath Shinde; Ajit Pawar (till his demise in 2026) Sunetra Pawar (from 2026)
- Guardian Minister: Raigad

Member of the Maharashtra Legislative Assembly
- Incumbent
- Assumed office 2009
- Preceded by: Manikrao Jagtap
- Constituency: Mahad

Personal details
- Party: Shiv Sena

Bharatsheth Maruti Gogawale (born 1963) is an Indian politician from Maharashtra. He is a four time MLA from Mahad Assembly constituency in Raigad District. He has been elected for four consecutive terms in the Maharashtra Legislative Assembly winning in 2009, 2014, 2019 and 2024.

== Early life and education ==
Bharatshet is from Mahad, Raigad District, Maharashtra. He is the son of Gogawale Maruti Krishnaji. He passed Class 8 in 1978 at Shivaji Educational Institute, Multipurpose Technical High School.

== Career ==
Bharatshet won from Mahad Assembly constituency representing the Shiv Sena Party in the 2024 Maharashtra Legislative Assembly election. He polled 117,442 votes and defeated his nearest rival, Snehal Manik Jagtap of the Shiv Sena (UBT), by a huge margin of 26,210 votes.

He became an MLA for the first time winning the 2009 Maharashtra Legislative Assembly election. He retained the seat in the 2014 Maharashtra Legislative Assembly election and won for a third time in the 2019 Assembly election. He won the 2024 Maharashtra Legislative Assembly election representing the Shiv Sena for this fourth consecutive term.
