= Babanrao Gholap =

Indian politician

Member of Legislative Assembly of Maharashtra
- In office 1990–2014
- Preceded by: Bhikchand Donde
- Succeeded by: Yogesh Gholap
- Constituency: Deolali

Cabinet Minister of Social Welfare of Maharashtra
- In office 1995–1999

Personal details
- Party: Shiv Sena

Babanrao Shankar Gholap alias Nana is an Indian politician, from Nashik district. He was a member of the Maharashtra Legislative Assembly from Deolali Vidhan Sabha constituency as member of Shiv Sena. He had been elected to Vidhan Sabha for five consecutive terms from 1990-2009. He was the cabinet minister of Social Welfare in the Maharashtra Government.

== Positions held ==
- 1990: Elected to Maharashtra Legislative Assembly (1st term)
- 1995: Re-elected to Maharashtra Legislative Assembly (2nd term)
- 1995-99: Cabinet Minister of Social Welfare of Maharashtra
- 1999: Re-elected to Maharashtra Legislative Assembly (3rd term)
- 2004: Re-elected to Maharashtra Legislative Assembly (4th term)
- 2009: Re-elected to Maharashtra Legislative Assembly (5th term)
- 2010 Onwards: Deputy Leader, Shiv Sena

== See also ==
- Manohar Joshi Ministry
- Nashik Lok Sabha constituency
