= Saoli Assembly constituency =

Constituency of the Maharashtra legislative assembly in India

Coordinates: 20.08°N 79.78°E

Saoli
- Former constituency for the Maharashtra Legislative Assembly

Constituency details
- Country: India
- Region: Western India
- State: Maharashtra
- Lok Sabha constituency: Chandrapur
- Established: 1952
- Abolished: 2008

Saoli Assembly constituency was one of the 288 assembly constituencies of Maharashtra, a western state of India. Saoli was also part of Chandrapur Lok Sabha constituency.

== Member of Legislative Assembly ==
Year	Member	Party
1952	Marotrao Kannamwar	Indian National Congress
1957	Marotrao Kannamwar	Indian National Congress
1962	Marotrao Kannamwar	Indian National Congress
1963^	Wamanrao Gaddamwar	Indian National Congress
1967	Wamanrao Gaddamwar	Indian National Congress
1972	Yashodhara B. Bajaj	Indian National Congress
1978	Deorao Bhandekar	Indian National Congress (I)
1980	Mahadeo Tajane	Indian National Congress (I)
1985	Wamanrao Gaddamwar	Indian National Congress
1990	Shobha Fadnavis	Bharatiya Janata Party
1995	Shobha Fadnavis	Bharatiya Janata Party
1999	Shobha Fadnavis	Bharatiya Janata Party
2004	Shobha Fadnavis	Bharatiya Janata Party
2008 onwards : Constituency defunct

== Election results ==
=== Assembly Election 2004 ===
2004 Maharashtra Legislative Assembly election : Saoli
Party	Candidate	Votes	%	±%
BJP	Shobha Fadnavis	48,004	31.99%	▼14.35
INC	Deorao Bhayyaji Bhandekar	43,094	28.72%	New
BSP	Munghate Rameshchandra Jeewan	23,587	15.72%	▲14.53
Independent	Ahirkar Vinod Gajanan	15,611	10.40%	New
Independent	Pendam Diwakar Gulab	5,601	3.73%	New
GGP	Bapuji Ganpat Madavi	4,965	3.31%	▼0.40
BBM	Charandas Sambhaji Nikhade	3,559	2.37%	New
Margin of victory		4,910	3.27%	▼19.65
Turnout		1,50,057	66.43%	▼4.29
Total valid votes		1,50,039		
Registered electors		2,25,887		▲13.61
BJP hold		Swing	▼14.35	

=== Assembly Election 1999 ===
1999 Maharashtra Legislative Assembly election : Saoli
Party	Candidate	Votes	%	±%
BJP	Shobha Fadnavis	62,773	46.34%	▲0.77
RPI	Khobragade Mrunalini Girish	31,718	23.41%	New
NCP	Mahadore Rambhau Asaram	30,268	22.34%	New
GGP	Madavi Vijay Surajsingh	5,024	3.71%	New
CPI	Amrutkar Ganpat Govindrao	2,862	2.11%	New
BSP	Meshram Mukunda Alias Mukkadar Dewaji	1,612	1.19%	▼6.75
Margin of victory		31,055	22.93%	▲6.53
Turnout		1,40,612	70.72%	▼10.12
Total valid votes		1,35,462		
Registered electors		1,98,819		▲2.68
BJP hold		Swing	▲0.77	

=== Assembly Election 1995 ===
1995 Maharashtra Legislative Assembly election : Saoli
Party	Candidate	Votes	%	±%
BJP	Shobha Fadnavis	71,343	45.57%	▲2.63
INC	Gaddamwar Waman Vistari	45,677	29.18%	▼2.33
BSP	Nagpure Sakharam Kolhuji	12,430	7.94%	▲6.75
Independent	Mahadore Sanjay Maroti	9,002	5.75%	New
BBM	Fand Babanrao Gajananrao	8,272	5.28%	New
Independent	Anand Pramod Nilkanth	2,215	1.41%	New
Independent	Khobragade Lularam Zungaji	2,183	1.39%	New
Margin of victory		25,666	16.39%	▲4.96
Turnout		1,60,300	82.78%	▲36.37
Total valid votes		1,56,553		
Registered electors		1,93,639		▼25.92
BJP hold		Swing	▲2.63	

=== Assembly Election 1990 ===
1990 Maharashtra Legislative Assembly election : Saoli
Party	Candidate	Votes	%	±%
BJP	Shobha Fadnavis	49,924	42.95%	▲9.14
INC	Gaddamwar Waman Vistari	36,630	31.51%	▼14.44
BRP	Anand Pramod Nilkanthrao	14,365	12.36%	New
Independent	Prakash Murlidharrao Patil (Marakwar)	5,771	4.96%	New
Independent	Rajane Mahadeorao Laxmanrao	3,726	3.21%	New
BSP	Nagpure Guruji Sakharam Kolhuji	1,379	1.19%	New
JD	Singam Wmanrao Balkrishan	1,150	0.99%	New
Margin of victory		13,294	11.44%	▼0.71
Turnout		1,18,312	45.26%	▼18.33
Total valid votes		1,16,248		
Registered electors		2,61,379		▲106.05
BJP gain from INC		Swing	▼3.00	

=== Assembly Election 1985 ===
1985 Maharashtra Legislative Assembly election : Saoli
Party	Candidate	Votes	%	±%
INC	Gaddamwar Waman Vistari	36,611	45.95%	New
BJP	Shobha Fadnavis	26,933	33.80%	▲14.81
RPI(K)	Yadaorao Tukaramji Gedam	7,364	9.24%	▼6.72
Independent	Ingale Jayashri Ajay	4,436	5.57%	New
Independent	Eknath Salve	1,920	2.41%	New
Independent	Undaruji Bhanannaji Kundawar	701	0.88%	New
Independent	Kundawar Kawaluji Undaruji	575	0.72%	New
Margin of victory		9,678	12.15%	▲0.74
Turnout		81,694	64.40%	▼0.59
Total valid votes		79,674		
Registered electors		1,26,851		▲13.72
INC gain from INC(I)		Swing	▲15.22	

=== Assembly Election 1980 ===
1980 Maharashtra Legislative Assembly election : Saoli
Party	Candidate	Votes	%	±%
INC(I)	Tajane Mahadeo Laxmanrao	21,729	30.73%	▼5.89
INC(U)	Mashakhetri Baburao Patil	13,664	19.32%	New
BJP	Yenurkar Gulabrao Madhaorao	13,432	18.99%	New
RPI(K)	Gedam Yadaorao Tukaramji	11,290	15.97%	New
JP	Nana Nagpure	8,072	11.41%	▼19.28
Independent	Yadaorao Keuji Wadhai	2,528	3.57%	New
Margin of victory		8,065	11.40%	▲5.48
Turnout		72,878	65.33%	▼11.26
Total valid votes		70,715		
Registered electors		1,11,547		▲7.11
INC(I) hold		Swing	▼5.89	

=== Assembly Election 1978 ===
1978 Maharashtra Legislative Assembly election : Saoli
Party	Candidate	Votes	%	±%
INC(I)	Bhandekar Deorao Bhayyaji	28,466	36.62%	New
JP	Dada Deshkar Vakil	23,862	30.69%	New
INC	Dhole Narendrea Vishwanath	12,003	15.44%	▼39.59
Independent	Yadaorao Tukaramji Gedam	5,539	7.12%	New
Independent	T. K. Kosankar	4,832	6.22%	New
Independent	Mistri Asharaf Ali Mahammad Ali	1,685	2.17%	New
Independent	Chowdhari Rushideo Narayan	1,356	1.74%	New
Margin of victory		4,604	5.92%	▼24.43
Turnout		80,492	77.29%	▲3.49
Total valid votes		77,743		
Registered electors		1,04,143		▲8.80
INC(I) gain from INC		Swing	▼18.41	

=== Assembly Election 1972 ===
1972 Maharashtra Legislative Assembly election : Saoli
Party	Candidate	Votes	%	±%
INC	Y. Bhagirath Bajaj	37,482	55.03%	▲0.11
ABJS	Balayipant Deshkar	16,809	24.68%	▼4.44
INC(O)	Ramchandra Ballewar	5,340	7.84%	New
RPI	Raghobaji Gomaji Gongle	4,969	7.30%	New
Independent	Talande Vithalrao Kanhuji	1,877	2.76%	New
Independent	Atram Maroti Donu	947	1.39%	New
Independent	Kaduskar Dewaji	688	1.01%	New
Margin of victory		20,673	30.35%	▲4.54
Turnout		70,845	74.01%	▲6.87
Total valid votes		68,112		
Registered electors		95,723		▲10.86
INC hold		Swing	▲0.11	

=== Assembly Election 1967 ===
1967 Maharashtra Legislative Assembly election : Saoli
Party	Candidate	Votes	%	±%
INC	W. V. Goddamvar	30,485	54.92%	New
ABJS	T. B. Deskar	16,160	29.11%	New
Independent	S. G. Kachinkar	6,897	12.43%	New
Independent	Damodhar Laxman Kale	1,475	2.66%	New
Independent	G. R. Almast	488	0.88%	New
Margin of victory		14,325	25.81%	
Turnout		60,995	70.64%	
Total valid votes		55,505		
Registered electors		86,343		
INC hold		Swing		

=== Assembly By-election 1964 ===
1964 Maharashtra Legislative Assembly by-election : Saoli
Party		Candidate	Votes	%	±%
	INC	W. V. Goddamvar	31,081		
	PSP	V. A. Patil	12,378		New
Margin of victory			18,703		
Turnout					
Total valid votes			0		
change= }}
	INC hold		Swing		

=== Assembly Election 1962 ===
1962 Maharashtra Legislative Assembly election : Saoli
Party	Candidate	Votes	%	±%
INC	Marotrao Kannamwar	23,696	50.78%	▼13.43
Independent	Damodhar Laxman Kale	22,968	49.22%	New
Margin of victory		728	1.56%	▼44.97
Turnout		53,151	75.57%	▼1.72
Total valid votes		46,664		
Registered electors		70,330		▲10.15
INC hold		Swing	▼13.43	

=== Assembly Election 1957 ===
1957 Bombay State Legislative Assembly election : Saoli
Party	Candidate	Votes	%	±%
INC	Marotrao Kannamwar	27,907	64.21%	New
SCF	Umbre Kawadu Vithu (Sc)	7,682	17.67%	New
Independent	Kale Damodhar Laxmanrao	4,310	9.92%	New
PSP	Dekate Purushottam Mansaram	3,564	8.20%	New
Margin of victory		20,225	46.53%	
Turnout		43,463	68.07%	
Total valid votes		43,463		
Registered electors		63,849		
INC win (new seat)				

== See also ==
- Saoli
- Chandrapur district
- List of constituencies of Maharashtra Legislative Assembly
