= Saroj Ahire =

Indian politician

Member of the Maharashtra Legislative Assembly
- In office 2019–Present
- Constituency: Deolali

Personal details
- Party: Nationalist Congress Party
- Occupation: Politician

Saroj Babulal Ahire is a leader of the Nationalist Congress Party who is serving as member of Maharashtra Legislative Assembly from Deolali Assembly constituency in Nashik city.
