= Datta Rane =

Indian politician and cabinet minister

Datta Rane is a leader of Bharatiya Janata Party. He is a former cabinet minister in Government of Maharashtra. He was elected to Maharashtra Legislative Assembly from Shivadi constituency.
