= Shivadi =

Shivdi शिवडी Shri Kshetra Shivdi
- village
- Location in Maharashtra, India
- Coordinates: 20.1199677°N 74.1272153°E
- Country: India
- State: Maharashtra
- District: Nashik
- Taluka: Niphad

Government
  - Type: Panchayati Raj
  - Body: Gram Panchayat

Area
  - Total: 7.11 km^{2} (2.75 sq mi)
- Elevation: 550 m (1,800 ft)

Population (2011)
  - Total: 3,100 to 3,200
  - Density: 440/km^{2} (1,100/sq mi)

Languages
  - Official: Marathi
- Time zone: UTC+5:30 (IST)
- PIN: 422304
- Vehicle registration: MH-15
- Coastline: 0 km

Shivdi (Shri Kshetra Shivdi) is a village in the Niphad taluka of the Nashik district in Maharashtra, India. It is located on the banks of the Vinata river along the Niphad–Chandwad road. The village has a population of approximately 3,100 to 3,200 and is known for its religious significance due to the presence of saint Haribhakt Parayan Nathusing Baba Rajput.

== Geography ==
Shivdi is bordered by:

- North – Chandwad taluka
- East – Yeola taluka
- South – Sinnar taluka

Shivdi covers an area of approximately 711 hectares (7.11 km²). Some sources report a slightly larger area of 7.91 km², possibly due to different reporting years or measurement methods.

Nearby villages:

- Niphad – 5 km
- Khede – 1 km
- Shriramnagar – 4 km
- Sanevadi B – 5 km
- Lasalgaon – 15 km
- Pimpalgaon Baswant – 18 km

Nearby towns:

- Ozar – 30 km
- Chandwad – 35 km
- Sinnar – 45 km
- Manmad – 41 km
- Nashik – 46 km

== Climate ==
Shivdi has a tropical climate with distinct seasons:

- **Summer** (March–June): Temperatures 38–40 °C
- **Monsoon** (June–October): Average annual rainfall approximately 1,000 mm
- **Winter** (November–February): Night temperatures 5–10 °C

== Demographics ==
According to the 2011 Census, Shivdi has a population of around 3,247. Literacy rate is approximately 78%, with male literacy 94.93% and female literacy 82.43%. Major communities include Shinde, Kshirsagar, Khapre, and Jadhav families.

== Culture and Society ==
The village celebrates traditional festivals and hosts local fairs and events. Most residents follow the Warkari tradition. Eighteen communities coexist harmoniously. Notable personalities from the village include Kashinath Baba Shinde, Ranuji Borse, and Karbhari Shankar Kshirsagar.

== Economy ==
Shivdi's economy is primarily based on agriculture, with grapes as the main crop. Local businesses and small-scale trade also contribute to livelihoods.

== Places of Interest ==
- Shri Ram Temple
- Hinglaj Mata Temple (Khede)
- Local temples and Kirtan centres

== Civic Amenities ==
- Gram Panchayat – Shivteerth Gram Panchayat
- Primary school
- Primary hospital
- Public roads and water supply
- Amardham
- Recognized for cleanliness

== Transport ==
=== Road ===
Shivdi is connected by road to Nashik, Yeola, Lasalgaon, Pimpalgaon Baswant, and other nearby towns.

=== Rail ===
- Ugaon – 1.2 km
- Niphad – 6.7 km
- Lasalgaon – 15 km
