= Shobha Fadnavis =

Indian politician

Shobha Madhavrao Fadnavis is an Indian politician from the Bharatiya Janata Party. She is a member of the Maharashtra Legislative Council and a former minister in Government of Maharashtra. She hails from Mul, Chandrapur district. She represented Saoli Vidhan Sabha constituency from 1990 to 2004 until the constituency was abolished in 2008. She is the aunt of Chief Minister of Maharashtra Devendra Fadnavis.

She has written several books during her political career such as Pratyancha प्रत्यंचा (Biography) and Dhandola Sheticha (On Farmers).
