= Diwakar Raote =

Indian politician

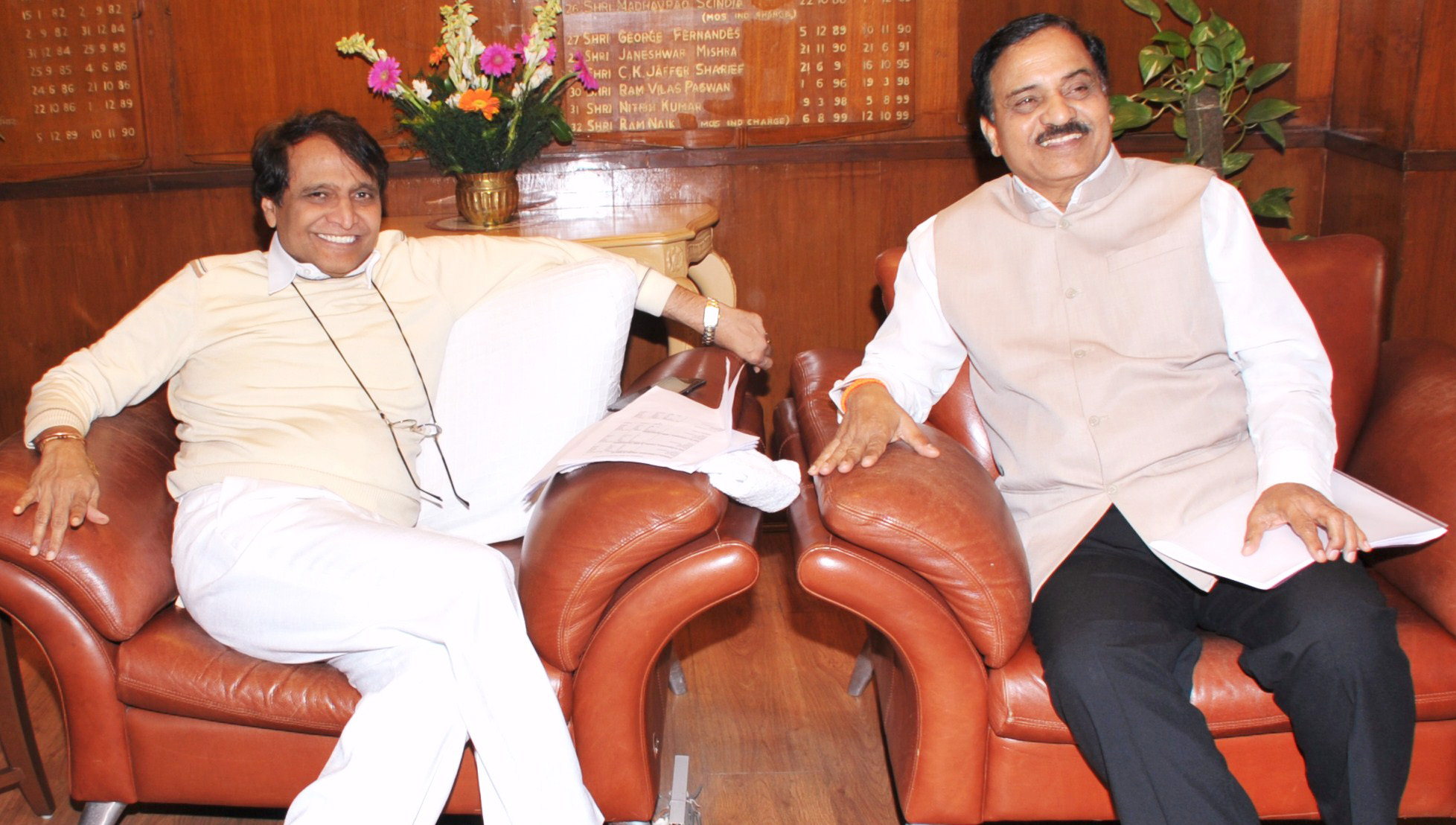
- Diwakar Raote calling on the Union Minister for Railways, Shri Suresh Prabhakar Prabhu, in New Delhi on February 22, 2016

Cabinet Minister of Transport Government of Maharashtra
- In office 5 December 2014 – 11 November 2019
- Governor: C.V.Rao

Member of Legislative Council of Maharashtra
- Incumbent
- Assumed office 8 July 2016

Personal details
- Party: Shiv Sena
- Occupation: Politician

Diwakar Raote is a leader of Shiv Sena from Maharashtra. On 5 December 2014 Raote took charge as the Cabinet Minister of Transport in the Maharashtra Government. He is also the guardian minister of Parbhani and Nanded Districts. Earlier he was entrusted with the responsibility of establishing Shiv Sena in Marathwada after the party's decision in 1985 to expand to the whole of Maharashtra. He became Mayor of Mumbai in 1991. In the Narayan Rane ministry, he was a cabinet minister of Revenue, Government of Maharashtra.

He belongs to the Panchkalshi, a scribal caste community of Hindu society in Maharashtra mostly found in Mumbai and the North Konkan region.

== Positions held ==
- 1991-1992: Mayor of Mumbai
- Leader, Shiv Sena
- 1995-1999: Cabinet Minister Maharashtra.
- 2004: Elected to Maharashtra Legislative Council
- 2008: Shiv Sena Party group Leader in the Maharashtra Legislative Council
- 2010: Elected to Maharashtra Legislative Council
- 2014: Cabinet Minister of Transport in Maharashtra State Government
- 2014-2016: Guardian minister of Parbhani and Nanded
- 2016: Elected to Maharashtra Legislative Council
- 2017: Guardian minister of Osmanabad

== See also ==
- Devendra Fadnavis ministry

Political offices
Preceded by Radhakrishna Vikhe Patil	Cabinet Minister for Transport, Maharashtra State; December 2014–present	Incumbent
Preceded by	Maharashtra State Guardian Minister for Parbhani district December 2014–present	Incumbent
Preceded by	Maharashtra State Guardian Minister for Nanded district December 2014–present	Incumbent
