= Nanasaheb Purohit =

Indian politician

Digambar Vinayak Purohit (28 May 1907 – 1994), alias Nana Purohit or Nanasaheb Purohit, was an Indian socialist politician and freedom fighter from Mahad, Kolaba region. Purohit led militant struggles during the struggle for Indian Independence, and was a long-time parliamentarian.

== Personal life ==
Purohit hailed from the Mahar community. He became involved in social work in his twenties. Apart from political activism, Purohit enjoyed walking and gardening.

== Quit India movement ==
Purohit was active in the Congress Socialist Party and the Quit India movement. He led a revolt in Mahad, organizing a massive peasant attack on the Tehsil Office. Five people were killed in a firing during the capture, including one government officer. Afterwards, Purohit managed to escape from the police net. He relocated to Karachi. During this period, he worked under instructions from the socialist leadership in Poona, with Achyut Patwardhan as the central figure. Patwardhan tasked him with organizing the movement in Karachi.

== Janjira struggle ==
In 1948, Purohit organized, along with Mohan Dharia, a people's army to liberate the nearby Janjira state. The rebels established a military camp at Khamgaon (on the border of Mhasale taluk) and formed a provisional government for an independent Janjira state there. The government included Purohit (Prime Minister), Sadashiv Bagaitdar (Home Minister), Mohan Dharia (Foreign Minister) and Janardan Bhokre (Defense Minister).

== Electoral politics ==
He emerged victorious in the 1951 Bombay Legislative Assembly election, winning the Poladpur-Mahad constituency with 13,597 votes (68.63%). He stood as a Socialist Party candidate. At the time, he argued for nationalizations of key industries and the building of a third camp in world politics.

He retained the Mahad seat in the 1957 assembly election, obtaining 19,091 votes (70.40%) as a Praja Socialist Party candidate. As of 1961, Purohit was the deputy leader of the PSP in the Maharashtra Legislative Assembly. However, he was defeated in the Shriwardhan constituency in the 1962 Maharashtra Legislative Assembly election by the Indian National Congress candidate Abdul Rahim A. Gafoor Antulay. Purohit finished second with 7,475 votes (25.76%).

Purohit returned to the Maharashtra Legislative Assembly in 1972 and was elected a Socialist Party candidate from Mahad with 27,737 votes (55.32%). In the 1978 assembly election, Purohit won the Mahad seat as a Janata Party candidate. He obtained 37,413 votes (60.03%).
