= Panditrao Ramrao Deshmukh =

Indian politician

- Occupation: Member of Legislative Assembly of Maharashtra State
- Years active: 1978 – 1980
- Political party: Janata Party

Panditrao Ramrao Deshmukh commonly known as Guruji, was a member of the Maharashtra Legislative Assembly. He represented Basmath (Vidhan Sabha constituency). He got elected in 1978 Maharashtra Legislative Assembly election.

== Positions held ==
- Secretary, Bahirjee Smarak Education Society, Basmath.
- Director, Purna Cooperative Sugar Factory, Basmath
- Head Master, Bahirjee College, Basmath

== See also ==
- Baburao Narsingrao Kokate (Adaskar)
- Vilasrao Deshmukh
