= Prabhakar More (politician) =

Indian politician (1963–2019)

Prabhakar Sundarrao More was an Indian politician. He was elected to the Maharashtra Legislative Assembly from Mahad in the 1990, 1995, 1999 Maharashtra Legislative Assembly election as a member of Shiv Sena.
