= Pramod Navalkar =

Indian politician

Pramod Sachchidanand Navalkar (23 Jan 1935 – 20 Nov 2007) was an Indian politician and member of the Shiv Sena political party. A legislator for over thirty years, he served as cabinet minister in the Government of Maharashtra from 1995 to 1999, holding the Cultural Affairs portfolio.

== Career ==
=== Journalism ===
Navalkar began his career as a journalist and commentator while he was still a college student. In 1955, he began writing a weekly column titled Bhatkyaachee Bhramanti ("Man About Town") in the Marathi language daily Navshakti. He is known as "Bhramantikaar" in Literature. The column, which dealt with political, social and cultural issues, ran continuously for 52 years without a break, and ended only with his death. This consistency earned him a mention in the Guinness Book of World Records for the longest-running op-ed column in the world.

=== Politics ===
His career as a successful journalist and writer led him gradually to politics. Navalkar was one of the earliest members of the Shiv Sena. He joined the newly founded party in 1968 and remained with it till his death fifty years later, exhibiting a degree of steadfastness and loyalty which is rare in Indian politics. He was elected as a corporator to the Bombay Municipal Corporation on the Shiv Sena ticket from a ward in Girgaum, Mumbai, in 1968. In 1972, he became a state legislator after winning the assembly election to the Maharashtra Vidhan Sabha from the Girgaum (Opera House) constituency in south Mumbai, winning by over 25,000 votes. After this, he consistently won the election to the upper house (Maharashtra Vidhan Parishad) from the Mumbai Graduates’ constituency from 1986 to 2006. Between 1995 and 1999, he served as minister of cultural affairs when his party, the Shiv Sena, was in power in Maharashtra. He was instrumental in projects like Nana Nani (for the elderly) parks.

== Personal life ==
Navalkar was born into a middle-class Marathi-speaking family. His father's name was Sachchidanand Navalkar. At a young age (just short of 20), Navalkar was married to Vandana, a lady of his own community and similar background. The marriage, which was arranged by their parents in the usual Indian tradition, was harmonious and happy. The couple celebrated their 50th wedding anniversary about two years before Navalkar died. They were parents of two daughters, Reshma and Shilpa, who are married to educated gentlemen and well-settled with their own families.

Navalkar was a long-time diabetic. In 1995, just around the time he became a cabinet minister in the state government, Navalkar underwent a heart by-pass operation. He died of a heart attack at his residence in Mumbai on Tuesday, 20 Nov 2007, at the age of 72. He was survived by his wife of over 50 years and two daughters.
