= Sudhir Joshi (politician) =

Indian politician (1940–2022)

Mayor of Mumbai
- In office 1973–1974
- Preceded by: R. K. Ganatra
- Succeeded by: B. K. Boman-Behram

Revenue Minister of Maharashtra
- In office 1995–1996

School Education Minister of Maharashtra
- In office 1995–1999

Personal details
- Born: 25 May 1940 Bombay, British Raj
- Died: 17 February 2022 (aged 81) Mumbai, Maharashtra, India
- Spouse: Suhasini Joshi
- Children: Preshit Joshi
- Parent(s): Gajanan Joshi; Indira Joshi
- Education: University of Mumbai
- Occupation: Politician

Sudhir G. Joshi (25 May 1940 – 17 February 2022) was an Indian politician from the state of Maharashtra and one of the leaders of the Shiv Sena political party.

He was a cabinet minister in the Government of Maharashtra led by Manohar Joshi. He held Revenue and School Education portfolios. He was also Mayor of Mumbai in 1973–74.

== Background and Family Information ==
Joshi was born to Indira Joshi and Gajanan Joshi, a businessman and owner of a local eatery in Dadar, Mumbai. He was married to Suhasini Joshi on 10 June 1965, and has a son, Preshit Joshi. He graduated with a Bachelor of Science degree in chemistry from D. G. Ruparel College in Matunga.

== Career ==
=== Political ===
Joshi started his political career by getting elected as a corporator in the Brihanmumbai Municipal Corporation (BMC) in 1968. In the BMC elections of 1973, the Shiv Sena-Republican Party of India alliance won a majority. Hence, Joshi was elected to the post of corporator for another term of 5 years. In the wake of this victory, he was elected to the post of Mayor of Mumbai with the support of one Congress faction, the RPI and some corporators of the Muslim League. He remained in office till 1974, after which he resumed his duties as a corporator till 1978. He was the first Mayor belonging to the Shiv Sena.

In 1986, he was elected as a Member of the Maharashtra Legislative Council (Vidhan Parishad) in the state of Maharashtra. He held this position till 1999. During this period, from 1992 to 1995, he was the Leader of Opposition in the Vidhan Parishad. In 1995, when the Shiv Sena-BJP alliance came to power, he was allotted the portfolios of Revenue Minister and School Education Minister. Joshi has been the President of the Sthaniya Lokadhikar Samiti (SLS) for 20 years, since 1977. In 1997, after holding the two ministerial portfolios for two years, he resigned from the post of the SLS President. Under his leadership, the SLS had established and secured jobs for many native Maharashtrians in Mumbai's 5 star hotels, banks, the insurance sector, multinational companies, and most importantly, Air India.

After Joshi met with an accident, the Revenue portfolio was given to Narayan Rane; when Joshi recovered and resumed office, the Revenue portfolio was not returned. He still held the School Education portfolio till his MLC term expired in July 1999. After this, he retired from active politics.

=== Social ===
Joshi held leadership positions in various organisations in the state of Maharashtra.

Post	Organisation
President	Shiv Sena Consumer Protection Cell
President	Bank of Maharashtra Workers’ Union
President	Indian Overseas Bank Workers’ Union
President	Canara Bank Workers’ Union
President	Milk Distributors’ Union
President	Insurance Workers’ Union
President	Sthaniya Lokadhikar Samiti (SLS)
President	All India Cabin Crew Association
Trustee	Sane Guruji School
Trustee	Dadar Sarvajanik Vachanalaya (Dadar Public Library)
Trustee	Shivai Seva Trust
Advisor	Jaslok Hospital Workers’ Union
Managing Committee Member	Garware Club

== Death ==
Joshi died in Mumbai on 17 February 2022, at the age of 81 from post Covid-19 complications.

== See also ==
- Mayor of Mumbai
- Shiv Sena
- Government of Maharashtra
- Brihanmumbai Municipal Corporation
