= Ministry of Majority Welfare Development (Maharashtra) =

Maharashtra government ministry responsible for Majority Welfare Development

Ministry of Majority Welfare Development Government of Maharashtra
- मंत्रालय बहुसंख्य कल्याण विभाग, महाराष्ट्र शासन
- Seal of the state of Maharashtra

- Building of Administrative Headquarters of Mumbai

Ministry overview
- Jurisdiction: (India) Maharashtra
- Headquarters: Mantralay, Mumbai
- Minister responsible: Devendra Fadnavis, Chief Minister of Maharashtra
- Deputy Minister responsible: Vacant, TBD since 29 June 2022, Minister of State
- Ministry executive: (IAS)
- Parent department: Government of Maharashtra

The Ministry of Majority Welfare Development is a Ministry of the Government of Maharashtra State.

The Ministry is headed by a cabinet level Minister. Devendra Fadnavis is Minister of Majority Welfare Development and Chief Minister Government of Maharashtra.

== Head office ==
Minister of Majority Welfare Development मंत्री बहुसंख्य कल्याण विभाग
- Emblem of India

- Flag of India
- Incumbent; Devendra Fadnavis; Chief Minister since 05 December 2024
- Ministry of Majority Welfare Development (Maharashtra)
- Style: The Honourable
- Abbreviation: Cabinet Minister
- Member of: State Cabinet
- Reports to: Chief Minister, Maharashtra Legislature
- Seat: Mantralaya, Mumbai
- Appointer: Governor on the advice of the Chief Minister
- Term length: 5 years
- Precursor: Vijay Namdevrao Wadettiwar; (2019- 2022)
- Inaugural holder: Niramala Raje Bhosale (1960-1962)
- Formation: 1 May 1960
- Deputy: Vacant, TBD; since 29 June 2022

== Cabinet Ministers ==
No.	Portrait	Minister (Constituency)	Term of office			Political party	Ministry	Chief Minister
No.	Portrait	Minister (Constituency)	From	To	Period	Political party	Ministry	Chief Minister
Minister of Majority Welfare
01		Yashwantrao Chavan (MLA for Karad North Constituency No. 259- Satara District) (Legislative Assembly) (Chief Minister)	01 May 1960	07 March 1962	1 year, 310 days	Indian National Congress	Yashwantrao I	Yashwantrao Chavan
02		Niramala Raje Bhosale (MLA for Satara Constituency No. 268- Satara District) (Legislative Assembly)	08 March 1962	19 November 1962	256 days	Indian National Congress	Yashwantrao II	Yashwantrao Chavan
03		Madhukarrao Dhanaji Chaudhari (MLA for Raver Constituency No. 11- Jalgaon District) (Legislative Assembly)	20 November 1962	24 November 1963	1 year, 4 days	Indian National Congress	Kannamwar l	Marotrao Kannamwar
04		Parashuram Krishnaji Sawant (MLA for Chiplun Constituency No. 265- Ratnagiri District) (Legislative Assembly) (Interim Chief Minister)	25 November 1962	04 December 1963	9 days	Indian National Congress	Sawant	Parashuram Krishnaji Sawant
05		D. S. Palaspagar (MLC for Elected by MLAs Constituency No. 19 - Bhandara District) (Legislative Council)	05 December 1963	01 March 1967	3 years, 86 days	Indian National Congress	Vasantrao I	Vasantrao Naik
06		Balasaheb Desai (MLA for Patan Constituency No. 261- Satara District) (Legislative Assembly)	01 March 1967	27 October 1969	2 years, 240 days	Indian National Congress	Vasantrao II	Vasantrao Naik
07		Sheshrao Wankhede (MLA for Sawargoan Constituency No. 49- Nagpur District) (Legislative Assembly)	27 October 1969	13 March 1972	2 years, 138 days	Indian National Congress	Vasantrao II	Vasantrao Naik
08		Vasantdada Patil (MLA for Sangli Constituency No. 282- Sangli District) (Legislative Assembly)	13 March 1972	04 April 1973	1 year, 32 days	Indian National Congress	Vasantrao III	Vasantrao Naik
09		Hari Govindrao Vartak (MLA for Bassein-Vasai Constituency No. 180- Palghar District (Legislative Assembly)	04 April 1973	17 Match; 1974	347 days	Indian National Congress	Vasantrao III	Vasantrao Naik
10		Anant Namjoshi (MLA for Girgaon Constituency No. 185- Mumbai City District) (Legislative Assembly)	17 Match; 1974	21 February 1975	341 days	Indian National Congress	Vasantrao III	Vasantrao Naik
11		Vasantdada Patil (MLA for Sangli Constituency No. 282- Sangli District) (Legislative Assembly)	21 February 1975	16 April 1977	2 years, 54 days	Indian National Congress	Shankarrao I	Shankarrao Chavan
12		Madhukarrao Dhanaji Chaudhari (MLA for Raver Constituency No. 11- Jalgaon District) (Legislative Assembly)	17 April 1977	07 March 1978	1 year, 324 days	Indian National Congress	Vasantdada I	Vasantdada Patil
13		Sundarrao Solanke (MLA for Majalgaon Constituency No. 229- Beed District) (Legislative Assembly)	07 March 1978	18 July 1978	133 days	Indian National Congress (Indira)	Vasantdada II	Vasantdada Patil
14		Sushilkumar Shinde (MLA for Solapur City Central Constituency No. 249- Solapur District) (Legislative Assembly)	18 July 1978	19 November 1979	1 year, 124 days	Indian Congress (Socialist)	Pawar I	Sharad Pawar
15		Bhagwantrao Gaikwad (MLA for Kalameshwar Constituency No. 52- Nagpur District (Legislative Assembly)	09 June 1980	21 January 1982	1 year, 226 days	Indian National Congress	Antulay	Abdul Rahman Antulay
16		Babasaheb Bhosale (MLA for Nehrunagar Constituency No. 172- Mumbai Suburban District) (Legislative Assembly) (Chief Minister)	21 January 1982	02 February 1983	1 year, 12 days	Indian National Congress	Bhosale	Babasaheb Bhosale
17		Ramrao Adik (MLC for Elected by MLAs Constituency No. 05 - Ahmednagar District) (Legislative Council) (Deputy Chief Minister)	07 February 1983	05 March 1985	2 years, 26 days	Indian National Congress	Vasantdada III	Vasantdada Patil
18		Sushilkumar Shinde (MLA for Solapur City Central Constituency No. 249- Solapur District) (Legislative Assembly)	12 March 1985	03 June 1985	83 days	Indian National Congress	Vasantdada IV	Vasantdada Patil
19		Shivajirao Patil Nilangekar (MLA for Nilanga Constituency No. 238- Latur District) (Legislative Assembly) (Chief Minister)	03 June 1985	12 March 1986	282 days	Indian National Congress	Nilangekar	Shivajirao Patil Nilangekar
20		Vilasrao Deshmukh (MLA for Latur City Constituency No. 235- Latur District) (Legislative Assembly)	12 March 1986	26 June 1988	2 years, 106 days	Indian National Congress	Shankarrao II	Shankarrao Chavan
21		Sharad Pawar (MLA for Baramati Constituency No. 201- Pune District) (Legislative Assembly) (Chief Minister)	26 June 1988	03 March 1990	1 year, 250 days	Indian National Congress	Pawar II	Sharad Pawar
22		Surupsingh Hirya Naik (MLA for Navapur Constituency No. 04- Nandurbar District) (Legislative Assembly)	03 March 1990	25 January 1991	328 days	Indian National Congress	Pawar III	Sharad Pawar
23		Jawaharlal Darda (MLC for Elected by MLAs Constituency No. 19 - Yavatmal District) (Legislative Council)	25 January 1991	25 June 1991	151 days	Indian National Congress	Pawar III	Sharad Pawar
24		Shankarrao Genuji Kolhe (MLA for Kopargaon Constituency No. 219- Ahmednagar District) (Legislative Assembly)	25 June 1991	26 December 1991	184 days	Indian National Congress	Sudhakarrao	Sudhakarrao Naik
25		Chhagan Bhujbal (MLA for Mazgaon constituency No. 210- Mumbai Suburban District) (Legislative Assembly)	26 December 1991	22 February 1993	1 year, 58 days	Indian National Congress	Sudhakarrao	Sudhakarrao Naik
26		Shivajirao Deshmukh (MLC for Elected by MLAs Constituency No. 18 - Sangli District) (Legislative Council)	06 March 1993	18 November 1994	1 year, 257 days	Indian National Congress	Pawar IV	Sharad Pawar
27		Babanrao Gholap (MLA for Deolali Constituency No. 126- Pune District) (Legislative Assembly)	14 March 1995	01 February 1999	3 years, 324 days	Shiv Sena	Joshi	Manohar Joshi
28		Pramod Navalkar (MLC for Mumbai Graduates Constituency No. 06 - Mumbai City District) (Legislative Council)	01 February 1999	11 May 1999	99 days	Shiv Sena	Rane	Narayan Rane
29		Leeladhar Dake (MLA for Bhandup Constituency No. 168- Mumbai Suburban District) (Legislative Assembly)	11 May 1999	17 October 1999	159 days	Shiv Sena	Rane	Narayan Rane
30		Chhagan Bhujbal (MLC for Elected by MLAs Constituency No. 09 - Mumbai City District) (Legislative Council) (Deputy Chief Minister)	19 October 1999	16 January 2003	3 years, 89 days	Nationalist Congress Party	Deshmukh I	Vilasrao Deshmukh
31		R. R. Patil (MLA for Tasgaon-Kavathe Mahankal Constituency No. 287- Sangli District) (Legislative Assembly)	18 January 2003	01 November 2004	1 year, 295 days	Nationalist Congress Party	Sushilkumar	Sushilkumar Shinde
32		Vilasrao Deshmukh (MLA for Latur City Constituency No. 235- Latur District) (Legislative Assembly) (Chief Minister)	01 November 2004	01 December 2008	4 years, 30 days	Indian National Congress	Deshmukh II	Vilasrao Deshmukh
33		R. R. Patil (MLA for Tasgaon-Kavathe Mahankal Constituency No. 287- Sangli District) (Legislative Assembly)	08 December 2008	06 November 2009	333 days	Nationalist Congress Party	Ashok I	Ashok Chavan
34		Patangrao Kadam (MLA for Palus-Kadegaon Constituency No. 285- Sangli District) (Legislative Assembly)	07 November 2009	10 November 2010	1 year, 3 days	Indian National Congress	Ashok II	Ashok Chavan
35		Prithviraj Chavan (MLC for Elected by MLAs Constituency No. 19 - Satara District) (Legislative Council) (Chief Minister)	11 November 2010	07 June 2014	3 years, 208 days	Indian National Congress	Prithviraj	Prithviraj Chavan
36		Madhukarrao Chavan (MLA for Tuljapur Constituency No. 241 - Dharashiv District Also Previously Known Osmanabad District (Legislative Assembly)	07 June 2014	26 September 2014	111 days	Indian National Congress	Prithviraj	Prithviraj Chavan
37		Devendra Fadnavis (MLA for Nagpur South West Constituency No. 52- Nagpur District) (Legislative Assembly) (Chief Minister)	31 October 2014	04 June 2016	1 year, 217 days	Bharatiya Janata Party	Fadnavis I	Devendra Fadnavis
38		Subhash Desai (MLC for Elected by MLAs Constituency No. 09 - Mumbai Suburban District) (Legislative Council)	04 June 2016	12 November 2019	3 years, 161 days	Shiv Sena	Fadnavis I	Devendra Fadnavis
39		Devendra Fadnavis (MLA for Nagpur South West Constituency No. 52- Nagpur District) (Legislative Assembly) (Chief_Minister); In Charge	23 November 2019	28 November 2019	5 days	Bharatiya Janata Party	Fadnavis II	Devendra Fadnavis
40		Subhash Desai (MLC for Elected by MLAs Constituency No. 09 - Mumbai Suburban District) (Legislative Council)	28 November 2019	30 December 2019	32 days	Shiv Sena	Thackeray	Uddhav Thackeray
41		Vijay Namdevrao Wadettiwar (MLA for Bramhapuri Constituency No. 73- Chandrapur District) (Legislative Assembly)	30 December 2019	29 June 2022	2 years, 181 days	Indian National Congress	Thackeray	Uddhav Thackeray
42		Eknath Shinde (MLA for Kopri-Pachpakhadi Constituency No. 147- Thane District) (Legislative Assembly) (Chief Minister); In Charge	30 June 2022	14 August 2022	45 days	Shiv Sena (2022–present)	Eknath	Eknath Shinde
43		Eknath Shinde (MLA for Kopri-Pachpakhadi Constituency No. 147- Thane District) (Legislative Assembly) (Chief Minister)	14 August 2022	26 November 2024	2 years, 135 days	Shiv Sena (2022–present)	Eknath	Eknath Shinde
44		Devendra Fadnavis (MLA for Nagpur South West Constituency No. 52- Nagpur District) (Legislative Assembly) (Chief_Minister); In Charge	05 December 2024	Incumbent	1 year, 277 days	Bharatiya Janata Party	Fadnavis III	Devendra Fadnavis

== Ministers of State ==
No.	Portrait	Deputy Minister (Constituency)	Term of office			Political party	Ministry	Minister	Chief Minister
No.	Portrait	Deputy Minister (Constituency)	From	To	Period	Political party	Ministry	Minister	Chief Minister
Deputy Minister of Majority Welfare Development
Vacant			23 November 2019	28 November 2019	5 days	NA	Fadnavis II	Devendra Fadnavis	Devendra Fadnavis
01		Omprakash Babarao Kadu (MLA for Achalpur Constituency No. 42- Amravati District) (Legislative Assembly)	30 December 2019	27 June 2022	2 years, 179 days	Prahar Janshakti Party Supported Party Shiv Sena	Thackeray	Vijay Namdevrao Wadettiwar	Uddhav Thackeray
02		Dattatray Vithoba Bharne (MLA for Indapur Constituency No. 200- Pune District (Legislative Assembly); Additional_Charge	27 June 2022	29 June 2022	2 days	Nationalist Congress Party	Thackeray	Vijay Namdevrao Wadettiwar	Uddhav Thackeray
Vacant			30 June 2022	26 November 2024	2 years, 149 days	NA	Eknath	Eknath Shinde	Eknath Shinde
Vacant			21 December 2024	incumbent	1 year, 261 days	NA	Fadnavis III	Devendra Fadnavis (2024 – Present)	Devendra Fadnavis
