= Ministry of Finance (Maharashtra) =

Finance ministry of the Government of Maharashtra

Department of Finance Government of Maharashtra
- मंत्रालय वित्त विभाग महाराष्ट्र शासन
- Seal of the state of Maharashtra

- Building of Administrative Headquarters of Mumbai

Ministry overview
- Jurisdiction: (India) Maharashtra
- Headquarters: Mantralay, Mumbai
- Minister responsible: Devendra Fadnavis, Chief Minister of Maharashtra and Minister of Finance Additional Charge
- Deputy Minister responsible: Ashish Jaiswal, Minister of State
- Ministry executive: Shri Manoj Saunik (IAS), Additional Chief Secretary
- Parent department: Government of Maharashtra
- Website: finance.maharashtra.gov.in/default.aspx

The Ministry of Finance is a ministry of the Government of Maharashtra. It is responsible for preparing annual plans for the development of Maharashtra state.

The Ministry is headed by a Cabinet level Minister. Devendra Fadnavis is current Chief Minister of Maharashtra and holds the Additional Charge of Minister of Finance after the death of Ajit Pawar.

== Cabinet Ministers ==
#	Portrait	Minister	Constituency	Term of office			Chief Minister	Party
1		S. K. Wankhede	Kalameshwar	1 May 1960	8 March 1962	1 year, 311 days	Yashwantrao Chavan	Indian National Congress
2		Sadashiv Barve	Shivajinagar	8 March 1962	20 November 1962	257 days	Yashwantrao Chavan	Indian National Congress
3		Marotrao Kannamwar	Saoli	20 November 1962	24 November 1963	1 year, 4 days	himself	Indian National Congress
4		P. K. Sawant	Chiplun	25 November 1963	5 December 1963	10 days	himself	Indian National Congress
(1)		S. K. Wankhede	Sawargaon	5 December 1963	1 March 1967	3 years, 86 days	Vasantrao Naik	Indian National Congress
5		Shankarrao Chavan	Bhokar	1 March 1967	27 October 1969	2 years, 240 days	Vasantrao Naik	Indian National Congress
6		Pratibha Patil	Edlabad	27 October 1969	13 March 1972	2 years, 138 days	Vasantrao Naik	Indian National Congress
7		A. R. Antulay	Shrivardhan	13 March 1972	21 February 1975	2 years, 345 days	Vasantrao Naik	Indian National Congress
8		Madhukar Dhanaji Chaudhari	Raver	21 February 1975	17 May 1977	2 years, 85 days	Shankarrao Chavan	Indian National Congress
9		Yashwantrao Mohite	Karad South	17 May 1977	5 March 1978	1 year, 62 days	Vasantdada Patil	Indian National Congress
9		Yashwantrao Mohite	Karad South	5 March 1978	18 July 1978	1 year, 62 days	Vasantdada Patil	Indian National Congress
10		Sundarrao Solanke	Majalgaon	18 July 1978	17 February 1980	1 year, 214 days	Sharad Pawar	Indian Congress (Socialist)
11		Ramrao Adik	MLC	9 June 1980	21 January 1982	1 year, 226 days	A. R. Antulay	Indian National Congress
12		V. Subramaniam		21 January 1982	2 February 1983	1 year, 12 days	Babasaheb Bhosale	Indian National Congress
13		Sushilkumar Shinde	Solapur	2 February 1983	3 June 1985	7 years, 30 days	Vasantdada Patil	Indian National Congress
13		Sushilkumar Shinde	Solapur	3 June 1985	12 March 1986	7 years, 30 days	Shivajirao Patil Nilangekar	Indian National Congress
13		Sushilkumar Shinde	Solapur	12 March 1986	26 June 1988	7 years, 30 days	Shankarrao Chavan	Indian National Congress
13		Sushilkumar Shinde	Solapur	26 June 1988	4 March 1990	7 years, 30 days	Sharad Pawar	Indian National Congress
(11)		Ramrao Adik	MLC	4 March 1990	25 June 1991	5 years, 10 days	Sharad Pawar	Indian National Congress
(11)		Ramrao Adik	MLC	25 June 1991	6 March 1993	5 years, 10 days	Sudhakarrao Naik	Indian National Congress
(11)		Ramrao Adik	MLC	6 March 1993	14 March 1995	5 years, 10 days	Sharad Pawar	Indian National Congress
14		Hashu Advani	Chembur	14 March 1995	18 September 1995	188 days	Manohar Joshi	Bharatiya Janata Party
15		Eknath Khadse	Muktainagar	18 September 1995	10 June 1997	1 year, 265 days	Manohar Joshi	Bharatiya Janata Party
16		Mahadeo Shivankar	Amgaon	10 June 1997	1 February 1999	2 years, 130 days	Manohar Joshi	Bharatiya Janata Party
16		Mahadeo Shivankar	Amgaon	1 February 1999	18 October 1999	2 years, 130 days	Narayan Rane	Bharatiya Janata Party
17		Surupsingh Naik	Navapur	18 October 1999	27 October 1999	9 days	Vilasrao Deshmukh	Indian National Congress
18		Jayant Patil	Walva	27 October 1999	18 January 2003	9 years, 42 days	Vilasrao Deshmukh	Nationalist Congress Party
18		Jayant Patil	Walva	18 January 2003	1 November 2004	9 years, 42 days	Sushilkumar Shinde	Nationalist Congress Party
18		Jayant Patil	Walva	1 November 2004	8 December 2008	9 years, 42 days	Vilasrao Deshmukh	Nationalist Congress Party
19		Dilip Walse Patil	Ambegaon	8 December 2008	7 November 2009	334 days	Ashok Chavan	Nationalist Congress Party
20		Sunil Tatkare	Shrivardhan	7 November 2009	11 November 2010	1 year, 4 days	Ashok Chavan	Nationalist Congress Party
21		Ajit Pawar	Baramati	11 November 2010	25 September 2012	1 year, 319 days	Prithviraj Chavan	Nationalist Congress Party
22		Prithviraj Chavan	MLC	25 September 2012	7 December 2012	73 days	Prithviraj Chavan	Indian National Congress
(21)		Ajit Pawar	Baramati	7 December 2012	28 September 2014	1 year, 295 days	Prithviraj Chavan	Nationalist Congress Party
23		Sudhir Mungantiwar	Ballarpur	31 October 2014	12 November 2019	5 years, 12 days	Devendra Fadnavis	Bharatiya Janata Party
(18)		Jayant Patil	Islampur	28 November 2019	30 December 2019	32 days	Uddhav Thackeray	Nationalist Congress Party
(21)		Ajit Pawar	Baramati	30 December 2019	30 June 2022	2 years, 182 days	Uddhav Thackeray	Nationalist Congress Party
24		Devendra Fadnavis	Nagpur South West	30 June 2022	2 July 2023	1 year, 2 days	Eknath Shinde	Bharatiya Janata Party
(21)		Ajit Pawar	Baramati	2 July 2023	5 December 2024	3 years, 37 days	Eknath Shinde	Nationalist Congress Party
(21)		Ajit Pawar	Baramati	5 December 2024	28 January 2026	3 years, 37 days	Devendra Fadnavis	Nationalist Congress Party
(24)		Devendra Fadnavis Additional Charge	Nagpur South West	28 January 2026	Incumbent	192 days	Devendra Fadnavis	Bharatiya Janata Party

== Ministers of State ==
No.	Portrait	Deputy Minister (Constituency)	Term of office			Political party	Ministry	Minister	Chief Minister
No.	Portrait	Deputy Minister (Constituency)	From	To	Period	Political party	Ministry	Minister	Chief Minister
Deputy Minister of Finance
Vacant			23 November 2019	28 November 2019	5 days	NA	Fadnavis II	Devendra Fadnavis	Devendra Fadnavis
01		Shambhuraj Desai (MLA for Patan Constituency No. 261- Satara District) (Legislative Assembly)	30 December 2019	27 June 2022	2 years, 179 days	Shiv Sena	Thackeray	Ajit Pawar	Uddhav Thackeray
02		Vishwajeet Kadam (MLA for Palus-Kadegaon Constituency No. 285- Sangli District) (Legislative Assembly); Additional_Charge	27 June 2022	29 June 2022	2 days	Nationalist Congress Party	Thackeray	Ajit Pawar	Uddhav Thackeray
Vacant			30 June 2022	26 November 2024	2 years, 149 days	NA	Eknath	Eknath Shinde (2022 - 2022); Devendra Fadnavis (2022 - 2023); Ajit Pawar (2023–2026)	Eknath Shinde
03		Ashish Jaiswal (MLA for Ramtek Constituency No. 59- Nagpur District) (Legislative Assembly)	21 December 2024	Incumbent	1 year, 230 days	Shiv Sena (Shinde Group)	Fadnavis III	Ajit Pawar (2024 – 2026); Devendra Fadnavis Additional Charge (2026 – Present)	Devendra Fadnavis

== Ministers of Small Savings (1960 - 1978 ) ==
No.	Portrait	Minister (Constituency)	Term of office			Political party	Ministry	Chief Minister
No.	Portrait	Minister (Constituency)	From	To	Period	Political party	Ministry	Chief Minister
Minister of Printing Presses
01		Homi J. H. Taleyarkhan (MLC for Elected by MLAs Constituency No. 22 - Mumbai Suburban District) (Legislative assembly	01 May 1960	07 March 1962	1 year, 310 days	Indian National Congress	Yashwantrao I	Yashwantrao Chavan
02		Homi J. H. Taleyarkhan (MLC for Elected by MLAs Constituency No. 22 - Mumbai Suburban District) (Legislative Council)	08 March 1962	19 November 1962	256 days	Indian National Congress	Yashwantrao II	Yashwantrao Chavan
03		Homi J. H. Taleyarkhan (MLC for Elected by MLAs Constituency No. 22 - Mumbai Suburban District) (Legislative Council)	20 November 1962	24 November 1963	1 year, 4 days	Indian National Congress	Kannamwar l	Marotrao Kannamwar
04		P. K. Sawant (MLA for Chiplun Constituency No. 265- Ratnagiri District) (Legislative Assembly) (Interim Chief Minister)	25 November 1962	04 December 1963	9 days	Indian National Congress	Sawant I	P. K. Sawant
05		Homi J. H. Taleyarkhan (MLC for Elected by MLAs Constituency No. 22 - Mumbai Suburban District) (Legislative Council)	05 December 1963	01 March 1967	3 years, 86 days	Indian National Congress	Vasantrao I	Vasantrao Naik
06		Vasantrao Naik (MLA for Pusad Constituency No. 81- Yavatmal District) (Legislative Assembly) (Chief Minister)	01 March 1967	27 October 1969	2 years, 240 days	Indian National Congress	Vasantrao II	Vasantrao Naik
07		Homi J. H. Taleyarkhan (MLA for Akot Constituency No. 28- Akola District) (Legislative Assembly)	27 October 1969	13 March 1972	2 years, 138 days	Indian National Congress	Vasantrao II	Vasantrao Naik
08		Anant Namjoshi (MLA for Girgaon Constituency No. 185- Mumbai City District) (Legislative Assembly)	13 March 1972	17 March 1974	2 years, 4 days	Indian National Congress	Vasantrao III	Vasantrao Naik
09		Narendra Mahipati Tidke (MLA for Savner Constituency No. 49- Nagpur District) (Legislative Assembly)	17 Match; 1974	21 February 1975	1 year, 323 days	Indian National Congress	Vasantrao III	Vasantrao Naik
10		Madhukar Dhanaji Chaudhari (MLA for Raver Constituency No. 11- Jalgaon District) (Legislative Assembly)	21 February 1975	16 April 1977	2 years, 54 days	Indian National Congress	Shankarrao I	Shankarrao Chavan
11		Shankarrao Genuji Kolhe (MLA for Shirdi Constituency No. 218- Ahmednagar District) (Legislative Assembly)	17 May 1977	07 March 1978	1 year, 294 days	Indian National Congress	Vasantdada I	Vasantdada Patil
Ending on 7 March 1978
