= Chavan ministry =

Chavan ministry may refer to these cabinets:

- Bombay State
  - First Yashwantrao Chavan ministry (Bombay State)
  - Second Yashwantrao Chavan ministry (Bombay State)
- Maharashtra Council of Ministers
  - First Yashwantrao Chavan ministry (Maharashtra)
  - Second Yashwantrao Chavan ministry (Maharashtra)
  - First Shankarrao Chavan ministry
  - Second Shankarrao Chavan ministry
  - First Ashok Chavan ministry
  - Second Ashok Chavan ministry
  - Prithviraj Chavan ministry

== See also ==
- First Yashwantrao Chavan ministry (disambiguation)
