= Vijay Namdevrao Wadettiwar =

Indian politician

- विजय नामदेवराव वडेट्टीवार
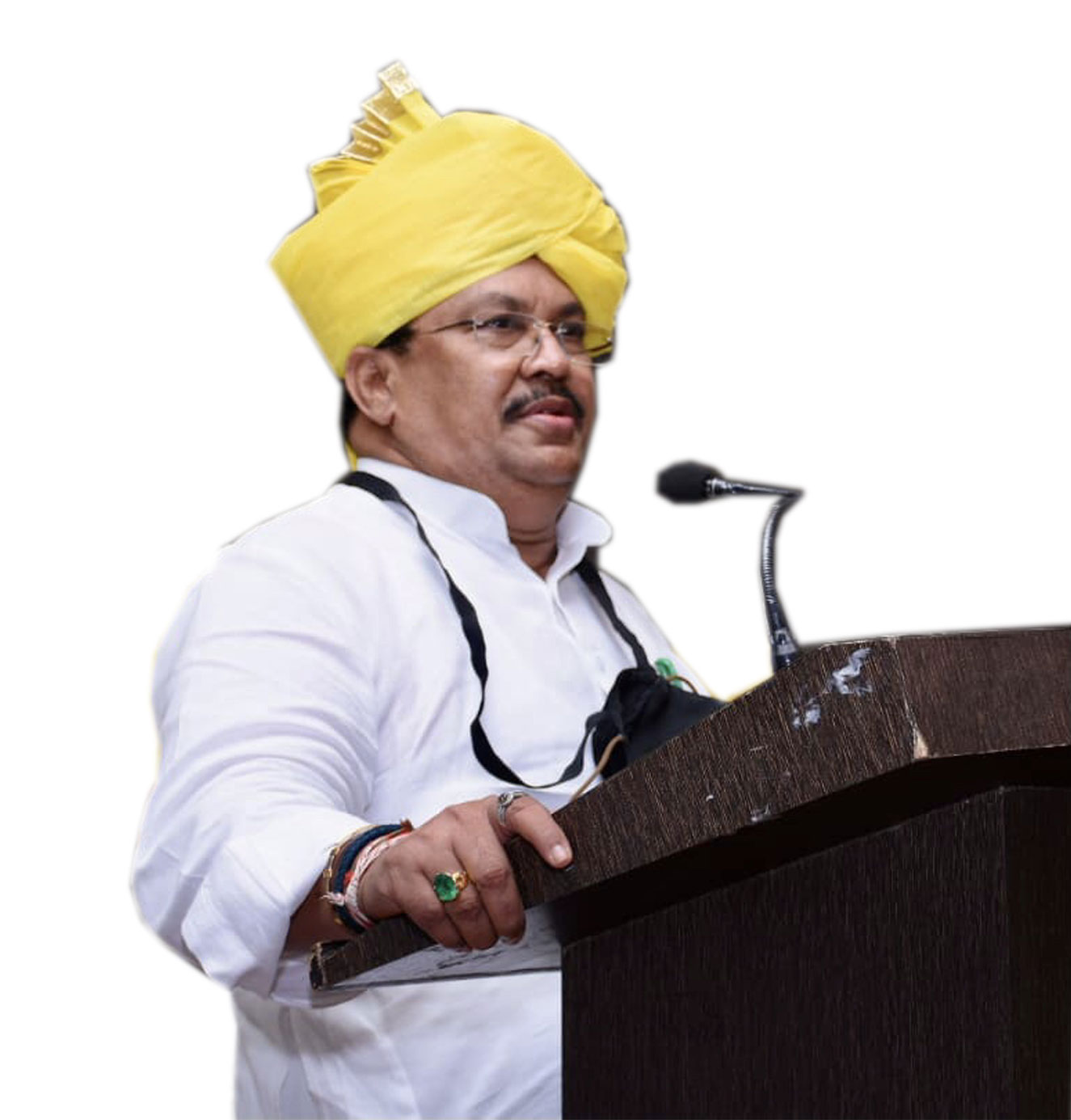

Congress Legislature Party (CLP) Leader Maharashtra Legislative Assembly
- Incumbent
- Assumed office 22 July 2025
- Party: Indian National Congress

21st Leader of the Opposition Maharashtra Legislative Assembly
- In office 3 August 2023 – 26 November 2024
- Governor: Ramesh Bais
- Deputy: Jitendra Awhad (NCP (SCP)); Ajay Choudhari (SHS(UBT))
- Chief Minister: Eknath Shinde
- Deputy CMs: Devendra Fadnavis (First Deputy CM); Ajit Pawar (Second Deputy CM)
- Preceded by: Ajit Pawar
- Succeeded by: Vacant (Note: No leader of opposition because no political party obtained at least 10% of the seats in the assembly.)
- In office 24 June 2019 – 9 November 2019
- Governor: C. Vidyasagar Rao; Bhagat Singh Koshyari
- Deputy: Shashikant Shinde (NCP)
- Chief Minister: Devendra Fadnavis
- Deputy CM: Eknath Khadse; Senior Cabinet Minister
- Speaker of the House: Haribhau Bagade
- Preceded by: Radhakrishna Vikhe-Patil
- Succeeded by: Devendra Fadnavis

Cabinet Minister Government of Maharashtra
- In office 30 December 2019 – 29 June 2022
- Minister: Disaster Management; Relief & Rehabilitation; Other Backward Classes; Bahujan Welfare; Socially and Educationally Backward Classes; Vimukta Jati; Nomadic Tribes; Backward Classes Welfare; Khar Land Development; Earthquake Rehabilitation; Majority Welfare Development
- Governor: Bhagat Singh Koshyari
- Cabinet: Uddhav Thackeray ministry
- Chief Minister: Uddhav Thackeray
- Deputy CM: Ajit Pawar

Member of Maharashtra Legislative Assembly
- Incumbent
- Assumed office 2014
- Constituency: Bramhapuri
- Preceded by: Atul Deshkar
- In office 2004–2014

Minister of State Government of Maharashtra
- In office 7 November 2009 – 9 November 2010
- Minister: Water Resources; Parliamentary Affairs; Finance; Planning; Energy
- Cabinet: Second Ashok Chavan ministry
- Chief Minister: Ashok Chavan
- Deputy CM: Chhagan Bhujbal
- Guardian Minister: Dhule District
- In office 8 December 2008 – 6 November 2009
- Minister: Water Resources; Tribal Development; Environment and Climate; Forest
- Cabinet: First Ashok Chavan ministry
- Chief Minister: Ashok Chavan
- Deputy CM: Chhagan Bhujbal
- Guardian Minister: Bhandara District

Member of Maharashtra Legislative Council
- In office 1998–2004
- Chairman of the House: Jayant Shridhar Tilak; Bhaurao Tulshiram Deshmukh Acting; N. S. Pharande; Vasant Davkhare Acting; Shivajirao Deshmukh
- Constituency: Wardha-Chandrapur-Gadchiroli Local Authorities

Personal details
- Born: 12 December 1962 (age 63) Gondpimpri, Gadchiroli district, Maharashtra, India
- Party: Indian National Congress
- Spouse: Kiran Wadettiwar
- Children: 4
- Occupation: Politician, agriculturist, businessman
- Website: vijaywadettiwar.in

Vijay Namdevrao Wadettiwar (born 12 December 1962) is an Indian politician from Maharashtra and the 21st former leader of the Opposition in the Maharashtra Legislative Assembly. He is a five-time Member of Legislative Assembly and a senior leader of the Indian National Congress (INC). He currently represents the Bramhapuri constituency in Chandrapur district.

== Early life and education ==
Wadettiwar was born on 12 December 1962 in Delanwadi village, Maharashtra. He belongs to the OBC community.

He completed his education up to graduation, and later pursued a career in agriculture and business alongside politics.

He is married to Kiran Wadettiwar.

== Political career ==
=== Early career (1980–1998) ===
Wadettiwar began his political journey in 1980–81 as a grassroots worker with the National Students' Union of India (NSUI), the student wing of the Indian National Congress. From 1991 to 1993, he served as a Member of the Zilla Parishad, Gadchiroli. In 1996, he was appointed Chairman of the Forest Development Corporation of Maharashtra (FDCM), a position he held until 1998.

=== Maharashtra Legislative Council (1998–2004) ===
From 1998 to 2004, Wadettiwar served as a member of the Maharashtra Legislative Council representing the Wardha-Chandrapur-Gadchiroli Local Authorities constituency.

=== Member of Legislative Assembly – Chimur (2004–2014) ===
In the 2004 Maharashtra Legislative Assembly elections, Wadettiwar was elected MLA from the Chimur constituency on a Shiv Sena ticket.

He later left Shiv Sena and rejoined the Indian National Congress.

He was re-elected from Chimur in the 2006 by-election as a Congress candidate and again in 2009 with a massive margin of 30,500 votes.

=== Minister of state (2008–2010) ===
Following the 2008 elections, Wadettiwar was appointed minister of state in the First Ashok Chavan ministry (December 2008 – November 2009), holding portfolios of Water Resources, Tribal Development, Environment & Climate, and Forests. He also served as guardian minister of Chandrapur District during this period.

In the Second Ashok Chavan ministry (November 2009 – November 2010), he continued as minister of state for Water Resources, Parliamentary Affairs, Finance, Planning, and Energy, and served as guardian minister of Dhule District.

=== Member of Legislative Assembly – Bramhapuri (2014–present) ===
In 2014, Wadettiwar contested from the Bramhapuri constituency on a Congress ticket and won by 15,000 votes — a historic victory as the constituency had been represented by BJP or Independent MLAs for 34 consecutive years (1980–2014). He was re-elected in 2019 and again in 2024, defeating BJP's Krishnalal Bajirao Sahare by a margin of 13,971 votes with a vote share of 50.93%.

=== Cabinet minister – Uddhav Thackeray Government (2019–2022) ===
From 30 December 2019 to 29 June 2022, Wadettiwar served as a cabinet minister in the Uddhav Thackeray ministry, holding portfolios of:

- Disaster Management, Relief & Rehabilitation
- Other Backward Classes (OBC) Welfare
- Bahujan Welfare
- Vimukta Jati & Nomadic Tribes Welfare
- Backward Classes Welfare
- Khar Land Development
- Earthquake Rehabilitation
- Majority Welfare Development

=== Leader of the Opposition ===
Wadettiwar has served as the Leader of the Opposition in the Maharashtra Legislative Assembly twice:

- First term: 24 June 2019 – 9 November 2019 (replacing Radhakrishna Vikhe Patil who had resigned and joined the BJP)
- Second term: 3 August 2023 – 26 November 2024 (replacing Ajit Pawar after NCP split; during the Eknath Shinde government)

He was appointed the 21st Leader of the Opposition in Maharashtra Legislative Assembly by the Congress high command.

=== Minister of state ===
- 2008-2009: Minister of State for Irrigation, Tribal Welfare, Environment and Forest, in the Minister of Council headed by Ashok Chavan
- 2009-2010: Re-elected as M.L.A. from Chimur, constituency with a margin of 30,500 votes
- 2009-2010 Nov.: Minister of State for Irrigation, Energy, Finance & Planning Parliamentary Affairs, in the Ministry headed by Ashokrao Chavan

Corporation/Co-operative Movement

- 1996-1998: Chairman - FDCM i.e. Forest Development Corporation of Maharashtra (Undertaking)
- 2008-2011: Director of Maharashtra State Co-Operative Bank, Ltd., Maharashtra

=== Leader of the Opposition ===
- Leader of the Opposition, Legislative Assembly of Maharashtra 2023-2024
