= First Yashwantrao Chavan ministry =

First Yashwantrao Chavan ministry could refer to one of the following cabinets headed by Indian politician Yashwantrao Chavan:

- First Yashwantrao Chavan ministry (Bombay State), 1956–57, as chief minister of Bombay State
- First Yashwantrao Chavan ministry (Maharashtra), 1960–62, as chief minister of Maharashtra

== See also ==
- Chavan ministry (disambiguation)
- Second Yashwantrao Chavan ministry (Bombay State), 1957–1960, as chief minister of Bombay State
- Second Yashwantrao Chavan ministry (Maharashtra), 1962, as chief minister of Maharashtra
