= Bassein Assembly constituency =

Constituency of the Maharashtra legislative assembly in India

Bassein
- Former constituency for the Maharashtra Legislative Assembly

Constituency details
- Country: India
- Region: Western India
- State: Maharashtra
- Established: 1952
- Abolished: 1972
- Total electors: 104,155

Bassein Assembly constituency was an assembly constituency in the India state of Maharashtra.

== Members of the Legislative Assembly ==
Election	Member	Party
1952	Sadanand G. Warty	Socialist Party
1957	Sadanand G. Warty	Praja Socialist Party
1962	Hari Govindrao Vartak	Indian National Congress
1967	Hari Govindrao Vartak	Indian National Congress
1972	Hari Govindrao Vartak	Indian National Congress

== Election results ==
=== Assembly Election 1972 ===
1972 Maharashtra Legislative Assembly election : Bassein
Party	Candidate	Votes	%	±%
INC	Hari Govindrao Vartak	40,589	58.65%	▲8.53
SSP	Pandhari Nath R. Choudhari	28,617	41.35%	New
Margin of victory		11,972	17.30%	▲3.87
Turnout		71,145	68.31%	▼9.87
Total valid votes		69,206		
Registered electors		104,155		▲12.85
INC hold		Swing	▲8.53	

=== Assembly Election 1967 ===
1967 Maharashtra Legislative Assembly election : Bassein
Party	Candidate	Votes	%	±%
INC	Hari Govindrao Vartak	34,494	50.12%	▼8.88
PSP	Sadanand G. Warty	25,252	36.69%	▲3.66
Independent	W. T. Samant	8,110	11.78%	New
ABJS	G. G. Gavankar	971	1.41%	New
Margin of victory		9,242	13.43%	▼12.55
Turnout		72,154	78.18%	▼0.90
Total valid votes		68,827		
Registered electors		92,293		▲13.02
INC hold		Swing	▼8.88	

=== Assembly Election 1962 ===
1962 Maharashtra Legislative Assembly election : Bassein
Party	Candidate	Votes	%	±%
INC	Hari Govindrao Vartak	36,498	59.00%	▲12.30
PSP	Sadanand G. Warty	20,430	33.03%	▼20.27
Independent	Baburao Shantaram More	3,807	6.15%	New
ABJS	Yeshwant Vithal Powale	1,122	1.81%	New
Margin of victory		16,068	25.98%	▲19.39
Turnout		64,583	79.08%	▼0.05
Total valid votes		61,857		
Registered electors		81,664		▲16.18
INC gain from PSP		Swing	▲5.70	

=== Assembly Election 1957 ===
1957 Bombay State Legislative Assembly election : Bassein
Party	Candidate	Votes	%	±%
PSP	Sadanand G. Warty	29,642	53.30%	New
INC	Hari Govindrao Vartak	25,975	46.70%	▼2.79
Margin of victory		3,667	6.59%	▲5.57
Turnout		55,617	79.13%	▲15.47
Total valid votes		55,617		
Registered electors		70,288		▲17.21
PSP gain from Socialist		Swing	▲2.79	

=== Assembly Election 1952 ===
1952 Bombay State Legislative Assembly election : Bassein
Party	Candidate	Votes	%	±%
Socialist	Sadanand G. Warty	19,283	50.51%	New
INC	Parulekar Ganesh Bhikaji	18,895	49.49%	New
Margin of victory		388	1.02%	
Turnout		38,178	63.66%	
Total valid votes		38,178		
Registered electors		59,970		
Socialist win (new seat)				
