= Yevla Assembly constituency =

Constituency of the Maharashtra legislative assembly in India

Coordinates: 20.04°N 74.49°E

Yevla
- Constituency No. 119 for the Maharashtra Legislative Assembly

Constituency details
- Country: India
- Region: Western India
- State: Maharashtra
- District: Nashik
- Lok Sabha constituency: Dindori
- Established: 1955
- Total electors: 327,444
- Reservation: None

Member of Legislative Assembly
- 15th Maharashtra Legislative Assembly
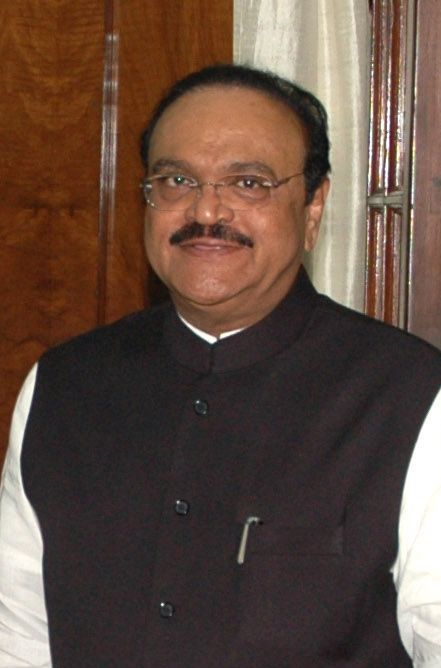
- Incumbent Chagan Chandrakant Bhujbal
- Party: NCP
- Alliance: NDA
- Elected year: 2024

Yevla (or Yeola) Assembly constituency is one of the fifteen constituencies of the Maharashtra Vidhan Sabha located in Nashik district.

== Overview ==
It (Yeola / Yevla / येवला) is a part of Dindori Lok Sabha constituency, along with five other assembly constituencies, namely Chandwad Assembly constituency, Dindori, Kalvan, Nandgaon Assembly constituency and Niphad Assembly constituency.

== Members of the Legislative Assembly ==
Year	Member	Party
1957	Dagu Shankar Kanade	Praja Socialist Party
1962	Hirubhau Manaku Gavali	Indian National Congress
1967	Madhavrao Thete Patil	Indian National Congress
1972	Nivrutti Ramji Bhorkade	Independent politician
1978	Janardan Deoram Patil	Independent politician
1980	Janardan Deoram Patil	Indian National Congress
1985	Marutirao Narayan Pawar	Indian Congress
1990	Marutirao Narayan Pawar	Indian National Congress
1995	Kalyanrao Jayawantrao Patil	Shiv Sena
1999	Kalyanrao Jayawantrao Patil	Shiv Sena
2004	Chhagan Bhujbal	Nationalist Congress Party
2009	Chhagan Bhujbal	Nationalist Congress Party
2014	Chhagan Bhujbal	Nationalist Congress Party
2019	Chhagan Bhujbal	Nationalist Congress Party
2024	Chhagan Bhujbal	Nationalist Congress Party

== Election results ==
=== Assembly Election 2024 ===
2024 Maharashtra Legislative Assembly election : Yevla
Party	Candidate	Votes	%	±%
NCP	Chhagan Bhujbal	135,023	54.17	New
NCP-SP	Adv. Manikrao Madhavrao Shinde-Patil	108,623	43.58	New
Independent	Narsinh Ramdas Darekar	2,115	0.85	New
NOTA	None of the Above	1,478	0.59	▲0.08
Margin of victory		26,400	10.59	▼17.61
Turnout		250,741	76.58	▲8.80
Total valid votes		249,263		
Registered electors		327,444		▲10.03
NCP gain from NCP		Swing	▼8.82	

=== Assembly Election 2019 ===
2019 Maharashtra Legislative Assembly election : Yevla
Party	Candidate	Votes	%	±%
NCP	Chhagan Bhujbal	126,237	62.99	▲4.53
SS	Sambhaji Sahebrao Pawar	69,712	34.78	▲0.40
VBA	Algat Sachin Vasantrao	1,858	0.93	New
NOTA	None of the Above	1,027	0.51	▲0.06
Margin of victory		56,525	28.20	▲4.13
Turnout		201,691	67.77	▼2.63
Total valid votes		200,422		
Registered electors		297,599		▲8.58
NCP hold		Swing	▲4.53	

=== Assembly Election 2014 ===
2014 Maharashtra Legislative Assembly election : Yevla
Party	Candidate	Votes	%	±%
NCP	Chhagan Bhujbal	112,787	58.45	▼4.69
SS	Sambhaji Sahebrao Pawar	66,345	34.38	▲1.02
BJP	Shivaji (Raje) Madhavrao Mankar	9,339	4.84	New
NOTA	None of the Above	876	0.45	New
Margin of victory		46,442	24.07	▼5.70
Turnout		193,887	70.74	▲4.78
Total valid votes		192,955		
Registered electors		274,072		▲6.70
NCP hold		Swing	▼4.69	

=== Assembly Election 2009 ===
2009 Maharashtra Legislative Assembly election : Yevla
Party	Candidate	Votes	%	±%
NCP	Chhagan Bhujbal	106,416	63.14	▲8.30
SS	Adv. Manikrao Madhavrao Shinde-Patil	56,236	33.37	▲3.18
BSP	Ahire Paulas Karbhari	1,984	1.18	New
Independent	Ghoderao Sandip Vishwanath	1,641	0.97	New
RPI(A)	Diwar Dinkar Sitaram	1,538	0.91	New
Margin of victory		50,180	29.77	▲5.12
Turnout		168,616	65.65	▼0.91
Total valid votes		168,546		
Registered electors		256,859		▲18.16
NCP hold		Swing	▲8.30	

=== Assembly Election 2004 ===
2004 Maharashtra Legislative Assembly election : Yevla
Party	Candidate	Votes	%	±%
NCP	Chhagan Bhujbal	79,306	54.84	▲24.81
SS	Kalyanrao Jayawantrao Patil	43,657	30.19	▼4.49
Independent	Shivaji(Raje) Madhavrao Mankar	18,030	12.47	New
Independent	Mohan Karbhari Gunjal	1,728	1.19	New
Independent	Paulas Karbhari Ahire	882	0.61	New
Margin of victory		35,649	24.65	▲24.46
Turnout		144,776	66.60	▲3.95
Total valid votes		144,616		
Registered electors		217,378		▲19.69
NCP gain from SS		Swing	▲20.16	

=== Assembly Election 1999 ===
1999 Maharashtra Legislative Assembly election : Yevla
Party	Candidate	Votes	%	±%
SS	Kalyanrao Jayawantrao Patil	39,419	34.68	▼4.61
INC	Narendra Bhikaji Darade	39,198	34.49	▲8.36
NCP	Ambadas Balaji Bankar	34,131	30.03	New
Margin of victory		221	0.19	▼12.97
Turnout		120,073	66.11	▼11.98
Total valid votes		113,659		
Registered electors		181,620		▲2.05
SS hold		Swing	▼4.61	

=== Assembly Election 1995 ===
1995 Maharashtra Legislative Assembly election : Yevla
Party	Candidate	Votes	%	±%
SS	Kalyanrao Jayawantrao Patil	52,144	39.29	▲13.46
INC	Ambadas Balaji Bankar	34,669	26.12	▼13.29
IC(S)	Marutirao Narayan Pawar	25,897	19.51	New
Independent	Santu Dhondiba Zambare	8,133	6.13	New
JD	Shivaji (Raje) Madhavrao Mankar	7,189	5.42	▼7.74
CPI(M)	Bhagwan Shankar Chhite	2,563	1.93	New
Margin of victory		17,475	13.17	▼0.41
Turnout		136,874	76.90	▲15.44
Total valid votes		132,710		
Registered electors		177,980		▲12.96
SS gain from INC		Swing	▼0.12	

=== Assembly Election 1990 ===
1990 Maharashtra Legislative Assembly election : Yevla
Party	Candidate	Votes	%	±%
INC	Marutirao Narayan Pawar	36,721	39.42	▲13.29
SS	Arun Laxman Thorat	24,067	25.83	New
Independent	Adv. Manikrao Madhavrao Shinde-Patil	13,728	14.74	New
JD	Mohan Kardhari Gunjal	12,256	13.16	New
Hindustan Janta Party	Eknath Rangnath Domade	1,403	1.51	New
Independent	Kuldhar Vishnu Kondaji	1,138	1.22	New
Independent	Hemant Diwakar Rankhambe	1,102	1.18	New
Margin of victory		12,654	13.58	▼27.50
Turnout		95,178	60.41	▼1.01
Total valid votes		93,165		
Registered electors		157,561		▲24.84
INC gain from IC(S)		Swing	▼27.79	

=== Assembly Election 1985 ===
1985 Maharashtra Legislative Assembly election : Yevla
Party	Candidate	Votes	%	±%
IC(S)	Marutirao Narayan Pawar	51,013	67.20	New
INC	Nivrutti Mahadu Lahare	19,830	26.12	New
Independent	Papa Ramdin Jawala	2,496	3.29	New
Margin of victory		31,183	41.08	▲29.05
Turnout		77,220	61.18	▲2.14
Total valid votes		75,908		
Registered electors		126,214		▲12.81
IC(S) gain from INC(U)		Swing	▲27.37	

=== Assembly Election 1980 ===
1980 Maharashtra Legislative Assembly election : Yevla
Party	Candidate	Votes	%	±%
INC(U)	Janardan Deoram Patil	25,851	39.83	New
Independent	Raybhan Gangadhar Kale	18,047	27.81	New
INC(I)	Marutirao Narayan Pawar	16,455	25.36	▲15.87
BJP	Kadam Bhanudas Ramchandra	4,236	6.53	New
Margin of victory		7,804	12.03	▲6.52
Turnout		66,519	59.46	▼6.40
Total valid votes		64,897		
Registered electors		111,878		▲9.28
INC(U) gain from Independent		Swing	▲2.78	

=== Assembly Election 1978 ===
1978 Maharashtra Legislative Assembly election : Yevla
Party	Candidate	Votes	%	±%
Independent	Janardan Deoram Patil	24,434	37.05	New
INC	Nivrutti Ramji Bhokade	20,804	31.55	▲2.00
JP	Dattaji Bhikaji Patil	14,446	21.91	New
INC(I)	Eknath Rangnath Domade	6,257	9.49	New
Margin of victory		3,630	5.50	▼23.86
Turnout		67,850	66.28	▲0.39
Total valid votes		65,941		
Registered electors		102,376		▲24.87
Independent hold		Swing	▼21.86	

=== Assembly Election 1972 ===
1972 Maharashtra Legislative Assembly election : Yevla
Party	Candidate	Votes	%	±%
Independent	Nivrutti Ramji Bhorkade	30,923	58.91	New
INC	Madhavrao Thete Patil	15,509	29.55	▼20.2
ABJS	Baban Raoji Gidge	6,059	11.54	▼18.49
Margin of victory		15,414	29.37	▲9.64
Turnout		53,849	65.68	▲3.18
Total valid votes		52,491		
Registered electors		81,989		▲16.93
Independent gain from INC		Swing	▲9.16	

=== Assembly Election 1967 ===
1967 Maharashtra Legislative Assembly election : Yevla
Party	Candidate	Votes	%	±%
INC	Madhavrao Thete Patil	21,224	49.75	▼6.47
ABJS	K. S. Patel	12,811	30.03	▲15.88
Independent	S. S. Aher	6,700	15.70	New
PSP	M. R. Nagadekar	1,127	2.64	▼1.62
Independent	W. B. Nyahrkar	800	1.88	New
Margin of victory		8,413	19.72	▼13.14
Turnout		45,904	65.46	▲0.07
Total valid votes		42,662		
Registered electors		70,120		▼8.00
INC hold		Swing	▼6.47	

=== Assembly Election 1962 ===
1962 Maharashtra Legislative Assembly election : Yevla
Party	Candidate	Votes	%	±%
INC	Hirubhau Manaku Gavali	26,040	56.22	▲22.88
CPI	Madhav Bayaji Gayakawad	10,820	23.36	New
ABJS	Sakharam Govind Deore	6,555	14.15	New
PSP	Dagu Shankar Kanade	1,973	4.26	▼41.19
Independent	Madhav Rupchand Nagdekar	929	2.01	New
Margin of victory		15,220	32.86	▲20.76
Turnout		49,806	65.35	▲10.78
Total valid votes		46,317		
Registered electors		76,216		▲18.25
INC gain from PSP		Swing	▲10.77	

=== Assembly Election 1957 ===
1957 Bombay State Legislative Assembly election : Yeola
Party	Candidate	Votes	%	±%
PSP	Kanade Dagu Shankar	14,643	45.45	New
INC	Shinde Kalawatibai Madhavrao	10,743	33.34	New
Independent	Nagadekar Madhav Rupchand	6,834	21.21	New
Margin of victory		3,900	12.10	
Turnout		32,220	49.99	
Total valid votes		32,220		
Registered electors		64,456		
PSP win (new seat)				

== See also ==
- Nandgaon (disambiguation)
- List of constituencies of Maharashtra Vidhan Sabha
