= Arun Mehta =

Indian software developer

- Education: IIT Delhi; Stony Brook University; Ruhr University
- Occupation: Software developer

Arun Mehta is an Indian software developer and a disability activist. At the request of Stephen Hawking, he, along with Vickram Crishna, developed a free and open source software named eLocutor, to allow nonverbal disabled people to write and speak.

== Early life ==
Mehta obtained a B.Tech. degree from IIT Delhi in 1975, a master's degree in computer sciences from the Stony Brook University. After that, he worked with Siemens AG in Erlangen for three years. As a fellow of Friedrich Ebert Foundation, he joined the PhD program of the Ruhr University in 1982. After returning to India, Mehta joined Indata Com Private Limited as the Managing Director. During this time, he developed a software for early detection of Alzheimer's disease, for the University of Pittsburgh.

== eLocutor ==
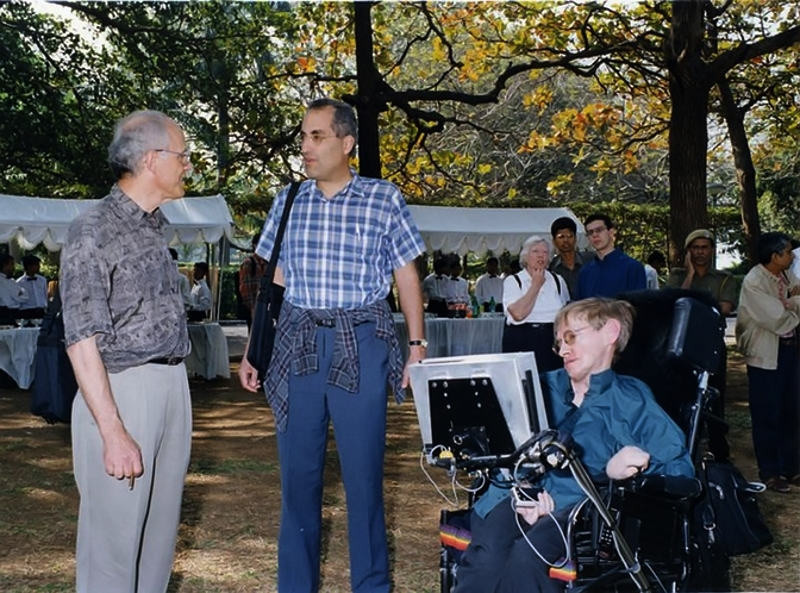
Hawking (sitting, right) during Strings Conference at TIFR, in 2001

During a tour to India in 2001, Stephen Hawking delivered a lecture in an international physics conference dedicated to String theory held at Tata Institute of Fundamental Research, Mumbai. It was during this time, Hawking, suffering from amyotrophic lateral sclerosis, contacted Mehta and Crishna along with several other software companies to write the replacement for the software he was using for the computerised machine fixed to his wheelchair, and to communicate with others. Mehta and Crishna developed eLocutor, a free and open source single-button typing and speaking software.

== Bibliography ==
- Peter, Wogart, Jan; Mehta, Arun; Kapur Mehta, Aasha (1993). Technology and competitiveness : the case of Brazilian and Indian machine tools. New Delhi: Sage Publications. ISBN 9780803991200. OCLC 27897348.
