= Second Yashwantrao Chavan ministry (Maharashtra) =

- Ministry of Maharashtra
- Date formed: 8 March 1962
- Date dissolved: 19 November 1962

People and organisations
- Governor: Sri Prakasa (Till April 1962); P. Subbarayan (April - October 1962)
- Chief Minister: Yashwantrao Chavan
- Total no. of members: 31; 17 Cabinet ministers (Incl. Chief Minister); 14 deputy ministers
- Member parties: Congress
- Status in legislature: Majority government
- Opposition party: PWPI; BJS
- Opposition leader: Legislative Assembly: Krishnarao Dhulap (PWPI); Legislative Council: V. B. Gogate (BJS)

History
- Predecessor: Y. Chavan I
- Successor: Kannamwar

Yashwantrao Chavan formed his second ministry as Chief Minister of Maharashtra on 8 March 1962, after leading his Indian National Congress to a majority in 1962 Maharashtra Legislative Assembly election. He demitted office in November 1962, having been appointed Minister of Defence by Prime Minister Jawaharlal Nehru. He was succeeded by his buildings and communication minister, Marotrao Kannamwar.

== List of ministers ==
The Second Chavan ministry consisted of 31 members: Chavan, 16 cabinet ministers, and 14 deputy ministers. The regions of Maharashtra were represented as follows:

Region	Cabinet ministers	Deputy ministers
Vidarbha	5	2
Marathwada	2	3
Western Maharashtra, Khandesh, & Konkan	6^{†}	8
Mumbai	4	1
^{†} including Chief Minister

=== Cabinet ministers ===
Cabinet
Portfolio	Minister	Took office	Left office	Party	
Chief Minister: General Administration, Home; Planning, Information and Public; Relations Information Technology; Departments or portfolios not allocated to any minister	Yashwantrao Chavan	8 March 1962	19 November 1962	INC	Chief Minister
Cabinet Minister: Building; Communications; Public Works; Textile	Marotrao Kannamwar	8 March 1962	19 November 1962	INC	Cabinet Minister
Cabinet Minister: Rural Development; Cultural Affairs	Gopalrao Bajirao Khedkar	8 March 1962	19 November 1962	INC	Cabinet Minister
Cabinet Minister: School Education; Water supply; Sanitation; Transport	Shantilal Shah	8 March 1962	19 November 1962	INC	Cabinet Minister
Cabinet Minister: Revenue; Environment and Climate Change; Parliamentary Affairs, Relief & Rehabilitation	Vasantrao Naik	8 March 1962	19 November 1962	INC	Cabinet Minister
Cabinet Minister: Industries; Law and Judiciary; Disaster Management; Mining Department; Protocol	S. K. Wankhede	8 March 1962	19 November 1962	INC	Cabinet Minister
Cabinet Minister: Agriculture; State Excise; Animal Husbandry, Dairy Development; Fisheries, Vimukta Jati	Balasaheb Desai	8 March 1962	19 November 1962	INC	Cabinet Minister
Cabinet Minister: Public Health; Sports and Youth Welfare; Tribal Development; Command Area Development	P. K. Sawant	8 March 1962	19 November 1962	INC	Cabinet Minister
Cabinet Minister: Irrigation; Power Energy; Ex. Servicemen Welfare; Printing Presses	Shankarrao Chavan	8 March 1962	19 November 1962	INC	Cabinet Minister
Cabinet Minister: Finance; Co-operation; Medical Education	Sadashiv Govind Barve	8 March 1962	19 November 1962	INC	Cabinet Minister
Cabinet Minister: Civil Supplies; Housing; Ports Development; Small Savings; Tourism	Homi J. H. Taleyarkhan	8 March 1962	19 November 1962	INC	Cabinet Minister
Cabinet Minister: Forests; Nomadic Tribes; Special Backward Classes Welfare, Khar Land Development; Earthquake Rehabilitation	D. S. Palaspagar	8 March 1962	19 November 1962	INC	Cabinet Minister
Cabinet Minister: Prohibition; Minority Development and Aukaf; Soil and Water Conservation	Abdul Kader Salebhoy	8 March 1962	19 November 1962	INC	Cabinet Minister
Cabinet Minister: Social Welfare; Special Assistance; Marathi language; Woman and Child Development, Majority Welfare Development	Niramala Raje Bhosale	8 March 1962	19 November 1962	INC	Cabinet Minister
Cabinet Minister: Urban Development; Horticulture; Higher and Technical Education	M. D. Choudhary	8 March 1962	19 November 1962	INC	Cabinet Minister
Cabinet Minister: Labour; Marketing; Food and Drug Administration, Other Backward Bahujan Welfare	M. G. Maney	8 March 1962	19 November 1962	INC	Cabinet Minister
Cabinet Minister: Skill Development, Employment and Entrepreneurship, Employment Guarantee, Other Backward Classes; Socially and Educationally Backward Classes,	Keshavrao Sonawane	8 March 1962	19 November 1962	INC	Cabinet Minister

=== Deputy Minister ===
Cabinet
Portfolio	Minister	Took office	Left office	Party	
	G. D. Patil	8 March 1962	19 November 1962	INC	Deputy Minister
	M. N. Kailas	8 March 1962	19 November 1962	INC	Deputy Minister
	Yashwantrao Mohite	8 March 1962	19 November 1962	INC	Deputy Minister
	Narendra Tidke	8 March 1962	19 November 1962	INC	Deputy Minister
	Madhusudan Vairale	8 March 1962	19 November 1962	INC	Deputy Minister
	Rajaram A. Patil	8 March 1962	19 November 1962	INC	Deputy Minister
	H. G. Vartak	8 March 1962	19 November 1962	INC	Deputy Minister
	B. J. Khatal	8 March 1962	19 November 1962	INC	Deputy Minister
	Rafiq Zakaria	8 March 1962	19 November 1962	INC	Deputy Minister
	D. K. Khanvilkar	8 March 1962	19 November 1962	INC	Deputy Minister
	S. L. Kadam	8 March 1962	19 November 1962	INC	Deputy Minister
	N. S. Patil	8 March 1962	19 November 1962	INC	Deputy Minister
	Shankarrao Bajirao Patil	8 March 1962	19 November 1962	INC	Deputy Minister
	Kalyanrao P. Patil	8 March 1962	19 November 1962	INC	Deputy Minister

=== Deputy ministers ===
- G. D. Patil
- M. N. Kailas
- Yashwantrao Mohite
- Narendra Tidke
- Madhusudan Vairale
- Rajaram A. Patil
- H. G. Vartak
- B. J. Khatal
- Rafiq Zakaria
- D. K. Khanvilkar
- S. L. Kadam
- N. S. Patil
- Shankarrao Bajirao Patil
- Kalyanrao P. Patil
