= Chhagan Bhujbal =

Indian politician (born 1947)

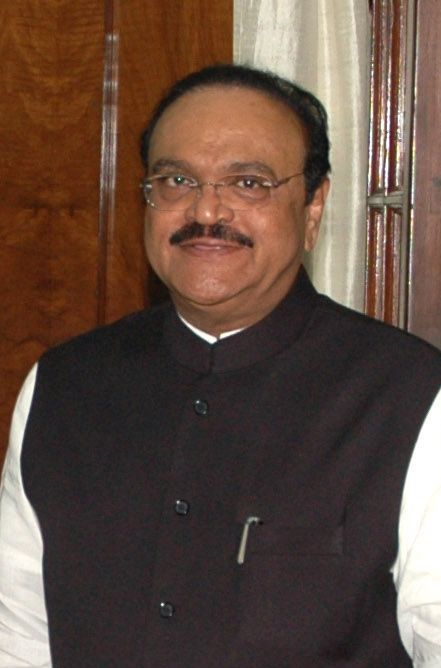

Cabinet Minister Government of Maharashtra
- Incumbent
- Assumed office 20 May 2025
- Minister: Food, Civil Supplies and Consumer Protection
- Governor: C. P. Radhakrishnan; Acharya Devvrat (additional charge)
- Cabinet: Third Fadnavis ministry
- Chief Minister: Devendra Fadnavis
- Deputy CM: Eknath Shinde; Ajit Pawar (till his demise in 2026) Sunetra Pawar (from 2026)
- In office 2 July 2023 – 26 November 2024
- Minister: Food, Civil Supplies and Consumer Protection
- Cabinet: Eknath Shinde ministry
- Chief Minister: Eknath Shinde
- Deputy CM: Devendra Fadnavis (first); Ajit Pawar (second)
- Preceded by: Ravindra Chavan
- Succeeded by: Dhananjay Munde
- In office 30 December 2019 – 29 June 2022
- Minister: Food and Civil Supply; Consumer Affairs; State Border Defence
- Cabinet: Thackeray ministry
- Chief Minister: Uddhav Thackeray
- Deputy CM: Ajit Pawar
- Guardian Minister: Nashik District
- Preceded by: Jayant Patil (acting) Food, Civil Supplies Ministry Consumer Protection Ministry; CM Uddhav Thackeray State Border Defence Ministry
- Succeeded by: Ravindra Chavan Food, Civil Supplies Ministry Consumer Protection Ministry; CM Eknath Shinde State Border Defence Ministry
- In office 11 November 2010 – 26 September 2014
- Minister: Public Works (excl. Public Undertakings); Public Works (incl. Public Undertakings); Tourism
- Cabinet: Prithviraj Chavan ministry
- Chief Minister: Prithviraj Chavan
- Deputy CM: Ajit Pawar
- Guardian Minister: Nashik District
- Preceded by: Himself Public Works (excl. Public Undertakings); Jaydattaji Kshirsagar Public Works (incl. Public Undertakings); Vijaykumar Krishnarao Gavit Tourism Ministry
- Succeeded by: Eknath Khadse Public Works (excl. Public Undertakings) Public Works (incl. Public Undertakings); Jayakumar Jitendrasinh Rawal Tourism Ministry

5th Deputy Chief Minister of Maharashtra
- In office 7 November 2009 – 10 November 2010
- Minister: Public Works (excl. Public Undertakings); Special Assistance
- Cabinet: Second Ashok Chavan ministry
- Chief Minister: Ashok Chavan
- Maharashtra Legislature: Leader of the House (Maharashtra Legislative Council); Deputy Leader of the House (Maharashtra Legislative Assembly)
- Guardian Minister: Amaravati District; Nashik District
- Preceded by: Himself Deputy Chief Minister Public Works (excl. Public Undertakings); Nawab Malik Special Assistance Ministry
- Succeeded by: Ajit Pawar Deputy Chief Minister; Himself Public Works (excl. Public Undertakings); Patangrao Kadam Special Assistance Ministry
- In office 18 January 2003 – 23 December 2003
- Minister: Ports Development Ministry; Social Justice Ministry
- Cabinet: Sushilkumar Shinde ministry
- Chief Minister: Sushilkumar Shinde
- Maharashtra Legislature: Deputy Leader of the House (Maharashtra Legislative Assembly)
- Guardian Minister: Nashik District
- Preceded by: Himself Deputy Chief Minister
- Succeeded by: Vijaysingh Mohite-Patil Deputy Chief Minister
- In office 18 October 1999 – 16 January 2003
- Minister: Home Affairs; Social Justice Ministry; Special Assistance Ministry; Majority Welfare Development
- Cabinet: First Deshmukh ministry
- Chief Minister: Vilasrao Deshmukh
- Maharashtra Legislature: Deputy Leader of the House (Maharashtra Legislative Assembly)
- Guardian Minister: Nashik District
- Preceded by: Gopinath Munde Deputy Chief Minister Home Affairs Ministry Social Justice Ministry Special Assistance Ministry; Eknath Khadse Majority Welfare Development
- Succeeded by: Himself Deputy Chief Minister Social Justice Ministry; R. R. Patil Home Affairs Ministry; Sushilkumar Shinde CM Special Assistance Ministry; Satish Chaturvedi Majority Welfare Development

Cabinet Minister Government of Maharashtra
- In office 6 March 1993 – 14 March 1995
- Minister: Housing; Other Backward Classes; Special Backward Classes Welfare
- Cabinet: Fourth Pawar ministry
- Chief Minister: Sharad Pawar
- Preceded by: Javed Iqbal Khan Housing Ministry; Ramrao Adik Other Backward Classes; Sushilkumar Shinde Special Backward Classes Welfare
- Succeeded by: Chandrakant Khaire Housing Ministry; Gopinath Munde Other Backward Classes Special Backward Classes Welfare
- In office 26 December 1991 – 22 February 1993
- Minister: Revenue; Khar Land Development; Majority Welfare Development
- Cabinet: Sudhakarrao Naik ministry
- Chief Minister: Sudhakarrao Naik
- Preceded by: Shankarrao Kolhe Revenue Ministry Khar Land Development Ministry Majority Welfare Development
- Succeeded by: Vilasrao Deshmukh Revenue Ministry; Prabhakar Dharkar Khar Land Development Ministry; Shivajirao Deshmukh Majority Welfare Development
Acting Minister
In office 28 November 2019 – 30 December 2019
Minister	Rural Development; Water Resources; Command Area Development; Social Justice Ministry; Special Assistance Ministry; State Excise; Skill Development and Entrepreneurship; Food and Drug Administration
Cabinet	Thackeray ministry
Chief Minister	Uddhav Thackeray
Preceded by	Pankaja Munde Rural Development Ministry; Girish Mahajan Water Resources Ministry Command Area Development; Suresh Khade Social Justice Ministry; Ram Shinde Special Assistance Ministry; Chandrashekhar Bawankule State Excise Ministry; Sambhaji Patil Nilangekar Skill Development and Entrepreneurship; Jayakumar Jitendrasinh Rawal Food and Drug Administration
Succeeded by	Hasan Mushrif Rural Development Ministry; Jayant Patil Water Resources Ministry Command Area Development; Dhananjay Munde Social Justice Ministry Special Assistance Ministry; Dilip Walse-Patil State Excise Ministry; Nawab Malik Skill Development and Entrepreneurship; Rajendra Shingne Food and Drug Administration
In office 8 December 2008 – 6 November 2009
Minister	Public Works (excl. Public Undertakings); Tourism; Other Backward Classes
Governor	S. C. Jamir
Cabinet	First Ashok Chavan ministry
Chief Minister	Ashok Chavan
Maharashtra Legislature	Deputy Leader of the House (Maharashtra Legislative Assembly)
Guardian Minister	Nashik District
Preceded by	R. R. Patil Deputy Chief Minister; Himself Public Works (excl. Public Undertakings); Vijaysinh Mohite-Patil Tourism Ministry; Dilip Walse-Patil Other Backward Classes
Succeeded by	Himself Deputy Chief Minister Public Works (excl. Public Undertakings); Vijaykumar Krishnarao Gavit Tourism Ministry; Shivajirao Moghe Other Backward Classes
Maharashtra Legislative Assembly
In office 1 November 2004 – 4 December 2008
Minister	Public Works (excl. Public Undertakings)
Governor	Mohammed Fazal; S. M. Krishna; S. C. Jamir
Cabinet	Second Deshmukh ministry
Chief Minister	Vilasrao Deshmukh
Deputy CM	R. R. Patil
Preceded by	Sushilkumar Shinde CM
Succeeded by	Himself

Member of Maharashtra Legislative Assembly
- Incumbent
- Assumed office 2004
- Preceded by: Patil Kalyanrao Jayawantrao
- Constituency: Yevla
- In office 1996–2004
- Constituency: Elected by MLAs
- In office 1986–1995
- Preceded by: Atmaram Tukaram Bhosale Alias Bhai Bhosale
- Succeeded by: Bala Nandgaonkar
- Constituency: Mazgaon

Leader of the Opposition Maharashtra Legislative Council
- In office 10 July 1996 – 17 October 1999
- Chief Minister: Manohar Joshi; Narayan Rane
- Preceded by: Sharad Pawar
- Succeeded by: Nitin Gadkari

Mayor of Mumbai
- In office 1990–1991
- Preceded by: Sharad N. Acharya
- Succeeded by: Diwakar Raote

Personal details
- Born: 15 October 1947 (age 78) Nashik, Bombay Province, India
- Party: NCP (since 1999)
- Other political affiliations: INC (1991–1999); Shiv Sena (1966–1991)

Chhagan Bhujbal (born 15 October 1947) is an Indian politician from Maharashtra, who is a member of the current Government of Maharashtra, headed by Devendra Fadnavis. Currently he is a member of 15th Legislative Assembly of Maharashtra from Yeola Assembly. He also served as the Deputy Chief Minister of Maharashtra from 2009–2010 and 1999–2003. He has also served as Minister of Public Works Department, Minister of Home Affairs, Minister of Food and Civil Supplies, and Minister of State Border Defence in the Government of Maharashtra.

== Political career ==
Before entering politics, Bhujbal was a vegetable vendor in Byculla market where his mother had a small fruit shop. He started his political career with the Shiv Sena in the 1960s. After being inspired by Shiv Sena's philosophy of Balasaheb Thackeray, Bhujbal evolved into a hardcore Shiv Sainik. He was amongst the initial members of the Shiv Sena. During his work as Corporator for the Brihanmumbai Municipal Corporation, Bhujbal maintained consistent contact, communication with rank and file of his constituency and its neighbourhoods. Later, he was elected as mayor of Mumbai twice. He was among the earliest MLAs of Shiv Sena elected from Mazgaon, first in 1985 and again in 1990.

He left Shiv Sena in 1991 and joined the Indian National Congress. Later, after the INC leader Sharad Pawar decided to split from the Congress and form his own party, the Nationalist Congress Party, Bhujbal went along with him.Bhujbal contested the 2014 General Elections from Nashik Constituency and lost the race to Hemant Godse from Shiv Sena.

Bhujbal is currently a Member of Legislative Assembly from Yevla Assembly constituency and has been incumbent since 2004.

Bhujbal belongs to the Mali (OBC) community. He shares strong ties with Bihar politician Upendra Kushwaha. On various occasions, Kushwaha has spoken to media that he considers Bhujbal as well as Sharad Pawar as his mentor and relies on them for his political decisions.

== Early life and studies ==
Chhagan Bhujbal was born into a poor Marathi Mali family in Nashik. He pursued his secondary and higher secondary education at Elphinstone High School in Mumbai. Later, he obtained a diploma in Mechanical Engineering from VJTI, Mumbai. From a young age, he actively participated in agriculture and agriculture-related businesses while developing a strong interest in social and political affairs in the state.

== Personal life ==
He is fluent in Marathi, Hindi. He is married to Mrs. Meena Bhujbal, and they have one child. His son, Pankaj Bhujbal, is a member of the Maharashtra Legislative Council.

== Enforcement Directorate proceedings ==
In December 2017, Enforcement Directorate attached assets worth 20.41 crore rupees belonging to the Bhujbal family under the Prevention of Money Laundering Act.

== Criticism ==
=== Allegations of deteriorating law and order situation in Nashik ===
Nashik known to be a peaceful district, where law and order situation has collapsed under Bhujbals' political clout. It is witnessing recession in all sectors. Daylight robberies, armed attacks, chain-snatchings and setting of two- and four-wheelers on fire have become routine.

In view of the criticism of the home department, chief minister Prithviraj Chavan sent police commissioner Vinod Lokhande on leave for his dismal performance, while Sameer Bhujbal demanded a CID probe into the collapse of law and order. But a senior Indian Police Service (IPS) official said that when each and every police official has been appointed on the family's recommendations, why should the home department be blamed? Chhagan Bhujbal must accept responsibility and initiate measures to restore the people's confidence.

However, any direct charges against Bhujbal concerning the law and order situation in Nashik could not be matched.

=== Alleged misuse and mismanagement of trust property ===
In 2012, Mumbai Educational Trust (MET) filed a criminal complaint against Chhagan Bhujbal, alleging misuse and mismanagement of trust property for family-run furniture business and destruction of evidence in connection.

=== Attack on Alpha Marathi ===
On 23 Dec 2003, Chhagan Bhujbal resigned from the post of Deputy Chief Minister of Maharashtra, owning the moral responsibility of attack on Alpha Marathi office in Andheri, Mumbai. A group of workers belonging to the Nationalist Congress Party (NCP) attacked the office of Alpha Marathi, which belongs to the Zee Group. They were upset with the channel for airing a satire on Bhujbal's alleged role in the multi-crore fake stamp paper scam. NCP president Sharad Pawar told the media on Tuesday night that Bhujbal had sought his permission to resign on moral grounds. Chhagan Bhujbal handed over his resignation to then Chief Minister of Maharashtra Sushilkumar Shinde.

== Dynamics of Conflict ==
=== Antagonistic to Maratha Kranti Morcha ===
- Chhagan Bhujbal opposes movement of Maratha Kranti Morcha for reservation demand of Maratha community under the Other Backward Class category despite his constitutional oath to uphold the sovereignty and integrity of India.

Chhagan Bhujbal suggested the Government of Maharashtra to carry out caste wise "Maharashtra Janganana" refers to the caste wise census of Maharashtra during 2027 census of India. The caste wise census will help to assess the actual outcomes of Reservation Schemes and to draft better targeted and equitable policies.

A 2024 report from the Maharashtra State Backward Class Commission (MSBCC) indicated that Maratha make up about 28% of the state's population. The exact percentage of the Kunbi caste in Maharashtra is not precisely reported, but they are often grouped with Maratha as part of the Maratha-Kunbi and Kunbi-Maratha cluster, which accounts for approximately 30% to 40% of the state's population. The Kunbi caste has Reservation in the Other Backward Class category. The exact population percentage for the Other Backward Class (OBC) in Maharashtra is disputed, with estimates ranging from 33.8% (based on 2011 census data) to over 38%, as suggested by recent analyses of educational and administrative datasets. A 2022 report by the Maharashtra State Backward Class Commission (MSBCC) analyzing data from the SARAL and UDISE reports indicated the Other Backward Class (OBC) population exceeding 38%.

- The Government of Maharashtra sets up the sub-committee for welfare of the Other Backward Class category amid protests.

== Criminal cases ==
=== Benami Property Cases ===
- The four separate Criminal cases were lodged against the Nationalist Congress Party Minister Chhagan Bhujbal and his firms, namely, M/s. Armstrong Infrastructure Private Limited, Parvesh Constructions Private Limited and M/s. Devisha Constructions Private Limited under Benami Transactions (Prohibition) Act, 1988. The SPECIAL MP/MLA Court revives proceedings against the Nationalist Congress Party Minister Chhagan Bhujbal, kin in ‘Benami Assets’ cases under Benami Transactions (Prohibition) Act, 1988. The cases has now been restored to its original stage and the hearing scheduled before the SPECIAL MP/MLA court in Mumbai. The SPECIAL MP/MLA court restored proceedings against Nationalist Congress Party Minister Chhagan Bhujbal, his son Pankaj Bhujbal, nephew Sameer Bhujbal and others related to complaints filed in 2021 under Benami Transactions (Prohibition) Act, 1988 by the Income Tax Department alleging ‘Benami Assets’, two years after they were quashed. The applications seeking to restore the cases back to the stage they were filed by the Deputy Commissioner of Income Tax, Benami Prohibition Unit-I in Mumbai, in December 2024, citing the Supreme Court of India order. In 2021, the Income Tax Department had initiated proceedings under the Benami Transactions (Prohibition) Act, 1988, against the Nationalist Congress Party Minister Chhagan Bhujbal and others including Satyan Appa Kesarkar, director of the Parvesh Constructions Private Limited, Devisha Infrastructure and Armstrong Infrastructure Pvt Ltd. Following this, a Magistrate Court in November 2021 had issued Summons to them.

Preceded by Gopinath Munde	Deputy Chief Minister of Maharashtra; 18 October 1999 – 24 December 2003	Succeeded by Vijaysingh Mohite-Patil
Preceded by Gopinath Munde	Minister of Home Affairs; 18 October 1999 – 24 December 2003	Succeeded by R. R. Patil
Preceded by Vijaysingh Mohite-Patil	Minister of Public Works; 1 November 2004 – 26 September 2014	Succeeded by Eknath Shinde
Preceded by R. R. Patil	Deputy Chief Minister of Maharashtra; 8 December 2008 – 10 November 2010	Succeeded by Ajit Pawar
