= Third Vasantrao Naik ministry =

- Ministry of Maharashtra
- Date formed: 13 March 1972
- Date dissolved: 21 February 1975

People and organisations
- Governor: Ali Yavar Jung
- Chief Minister: Vasantrao Naik
- Total no. of members: 21; 12 Cabinet ministers 9 junior ministers
- Member parties: Congress
- Status in legislature: Majority government
- Opposition party: PWPI; BJS
- Opposition leader: Legislative Assembly: Dinkar Patil (PWPI); Legislative Council: Uttamrao Patil (BJS)

History
- Election: 1972
- Predecessor: V. Naik II
- Successor: S. Chavan I

Following 1972 Maharashtra Legislative Assembly election, incumbent chief minister Vasantrao Naik was re-appointed, and he formed his third government on 14 March 1972. This was to be Naik's last government which served until 20 February 1975.

== Government formation ==
In the 1972 legislative elections, Indian National Congress secured 222 of the state's 278 assembly seats, leading to the incumbent chief minister being re-appointed. On 16 March 1972, a 21-member ministry was sworn in, consisting of 12 cabinet ministers, 8 ministers of state, and 1 deputy minister. Various ministers were later included in the ministry, and its membership had increased to 30 by November 1974.

== List of ministers ==
The initial ministry consisted of the following 12 cabinet ministers.

- Vasantrao Naik (Chief Minister)
- Vasantrao Patil (Cabinet Minister)
- Shankarrao Chavan (Cabinet Minister)
- Madhukar Dhanaji Chaudhari (Cabinet Minister)
- Narendra Mahipati Tidke (Cabinet Minister)
- Rafique Zakaria (Cabinet Minister)
- Yashwantrao Mohite (Cabinet Minister)
- Hari Govindrao Vartak Cabinet Minister)
- A. R. Antulay (Cabinet Minister)
- Pratibha Patil (Cabinet Minister)
- Anant Namjoshi (Cabinet Minister)
- M. B. Popat (Cabinet Minister)

== Cabinet Ministers ==
Portfolio	Minister	Took office	Left office	Party
Chief Minister: General Administration; Information and Public Relations	Vasantrao Naik	13 March 1972	21 February 1975	INC
Cabinet Minister: Home; Information Technology	Vasantrao Patil	13 March 1972	21 February 1975	INC
Cabinet Minister: Revenue	Shankarrao Chavan	13 March 1972	21 February 1975	INC
Cabinet Minister: Public Works	Madhukar Dhanaji Chaudhari	13 March 1972	21 February 1975	INC
Cabinet Minister: Prohibition	Rafique Zakaria	13 March 1972	21 February 1975	INC
Cabinet Minister: Buildings; Communications	Yashwantrao Mohite	13 March 1972	21 February 1975	INC
Cabinet Minister: Finance; Planning; Parliamently Affairs	A. R. Antulay	13 March 1972	21 February 1975	INC
Cabinet Minister: Law and Judiciary; State Excise	Pratibha Patil	13 March 1972	21 February 1975	INC
Cabinet Minister: Urban Development	Rafique Zakaria	13 March 1972	17 Match 1974	INC
Cabinet Minister: Urban Development	Narendra Mahipati Tidke	17 Match 1974	21 February 1975	INC
Cabinet Minister: Printing Presses	M. B. Popat	13 March 1972	17 Match 1974	INC
Cabinet Minister: Printing Presses	Shankarrao Chavan	17 Match 1974	21 February 1975	INC
Cabinet Minister: Environment and Climate Change	Pratibha Patil	13 March 1972	17 Match 1974	INC
Cabinet Minister: Environment and Climate Change	Madhukar Dhanaji Chaudhari	17 Match 1974	21 February 1975	INC
Cabinet Minister: Small Savings	Anant Namjoshi	13 March 1972	17 Match 1974	INC
Cabinet Minister: Small Savings	Narendra Mahipati Tidke	17 Match 1974	21 February 1975	INC
Cabinet Minister: Housing	Yashwantrao Mohite	13 March 1972	4 April 1973	INC
Cabinet Minister: Housing	Vasantrao Naik CM	4 April 1973	17 Match 1974	INC
Cabinet Minister: Housing	Anant Namjoshi	17 Match 1974	21 February 1975	INC
Cabinet Minister: Social Welfare	Vasantrao Naik CM	13 March 1972	4 April 1973	INC
Cabinet Minister: Social Welfare	Pratibha Patil	4 April 1973	17 Match 1974	INC
Cabinet Minister: Social Welfare	Rafique Zakaria	17 Match 1974	21 February 1975	INC
Cabinet Minister: Special Assistance	M. B. Popat	13 March 1972	4 April 1973	INC
Cabinet Minister: Special Assistance	Narendra Mahipati Tidke	4 April 1973	17 Match 1974	INC
Cabinet Minister: Special Assistance	Vasantrao Patil	17 Match 1974	21 February 1975	INC
Cabinet Minister: Agriculture; Majority Welfare	Vasantrao Patil	13 March 1972	4 April 1973	INC
Cabinet Minister: Agriculture; Majority Welfare	Hari Govindrao Vartak	4 April 1973	17 Match 1974	INC
Cabinet Minister: Agriculture; Majority Welfare	Anant Namjoshi	17 Match 1974	21 February 1975	INC
Cabinet Minister: Co-operation	Madhukar Dhanaji Chaudhari	13 March 1972	4 April 1973	INC
Cabinet Minister: Co-operation	Shankarrao Chavan	4 April 1973	17 Match 1974	INC
Cabinet Minister: Co-operation	Yashwantrao Mohite	17 Match 1974	21 February 1975	INC
Cabinet Minister: Sports and Youth Welfare	Rafique Zakaria	13 March 1972	4 April 1973	INC
Cabinet Minister: Sports and Youth Welfare	Hari Govindrao Vartak	4 April 1973	17 Match 1974	INC
Cabinet Minister: Sports and Youth Welfare	Madhukar Dhanaji Chaudhari	17 Match 1974	21 February 1975	INC
Cabinet Minister: Transport	Hari Govindrao Vartak	13 March 1972	4 April 1973	INC
Cabinet Minister: Transport	A. R. Antulay	4 April 1973	17 Match 1974	INC
Cabinet Minister: Transport	M. B. Popat	17 Match 1974	21 February 1975	INC
Cabinet Minister: Woman and Child Development	Anant Namjoshi	13 March 1972	4 April 1973	INC
Cabinet Minister: Woman and Child Development	Hari Govindrao Vartak	4 April 1973	17 Match 1974	INC
Cabinet Minister: Woman and Child Development	Pratibha Patil	17 Match 1974	21 February 1975	INC
Cabinet Minister: Ports Development	Yashwantrao Mohite	13 March 1972	4 April 1973	INC
Cabinet Minister: Ports Development	A. R. Antulay	4 April 1973	17 Match 1974	INC
Cabinet Minister: Ports Development	M. B. Popat	17 Match 1974	21 February 1975	INC
Cabinet Minister: Minority Development and Waqfs	A. R. Antulay	13 March 1972	4 April 1973	INC
Cabinet Minister: Minority Development and Waqfs	Rafique Zakaria	4 April 1973	17 Match 1974	INC
Cabinet Minister: Minority Development and Waqfs	A. R. Antulay	17 Match 1974	21 February 1975	INC
Cabinet Minister: Medical Education	Hari Govindrao Vartak	13 March 1972	4 April 1973	INC
Cabinet Minister: Medical Education	Rafique Zakaria	4 April 1973	17 Match 1974	INC
Cabinet Minister: Medical Education	Shankarrao Chavan	17 Match 1974	21 February 1975	INC
Cabinet Minister: Food, Civil Supplies & Consumer Protection	Vasantrao Patil	13 March 1972	4 April 1973	INC
Cabinet Minister: Food, Civil Supplies & Consumer Protection	Anant Namjoshi	4 April 1973	17 Match 1974	INC
Cabinet Minister: Food, Civil Supplies & Consumer Protection	Vasantrao Naik CM	17 Match 1974	21 February 1975	INC
Cabinet Minister: Food and Drug Administration	Shankarrao Chavan	13 March 1972	4 April 1973	INC
Cabinet Minister: Food and Drug Administration	A. R. Antulay	4 April 1973	17 Match 1974	INC
Cabinet Minister: Food and Drug Administration	Madhukar Dhanaji Chaudhari	17 Match 1974	21 February 1975	INC
Cabinet Minister: Relief & Rehabilitation	Madhukar Dhanaji Chaudhari	13 March 1972	4 April 1973	INC
Cabinet Minister: Relief & Rehabilitation	Shankarrao Chavan	4 April 1973	17 Match 1974	INC
Cabinet Minister: Relief & Rehabilitation	A. R. Antulay	17 Match 1974	21 February 1975	INC
Cabinet Minister: Disaster Management	M. B. Popat	13 March 1972	4 April 1973	INC
Cabinet Minister: Disaster Management	Anant Namjoshi	4 April 1973	17 Match 1974	INC
Cabinet Minister: Disaster Management	Yashwantrao Mohite	17 Match 1974	21 February 1975	INC
Cabinet Minister: Mining Department	Shankarrao Chavan	13 March 1972	4 April 1973	INC
Cabinet Minister: Mining Department	Vasantrao Patil	4 April 1973	17 Match 1974	INC
Cabinet Minister: Mining Department	Vasantrao Naik CM	17 Match 1974	21 February 1975	INC
Cabinet Minister: Socially and Educationally Backward Classes - SEBC	Madhukar Dhanaji Chaudhari	13 March 1972	4 April 1973	INC
Cabinet Minister: Socially and Educationally Backward Classes - SEBC	Yashwantrao Mohite	4 April 1973	17 Match 1974	INC
Cabinet Minister: Socially and Educationally Backward Classes - SEBC	Narendra Mahipati Tidke	17 Match 1974	21 February 1975	INC
Cabinet Minister: Special Backward Classes Welfare - SBCW	Hari Govindrao Vartak	13 March 1972	4 April 1973	INC
Cabinet Minister: Special Backward Classes Welfare - SBCW	A. R. Antulay	4 April 1973	17 Match 1974	INC
Cabinet Minister: Special Backward Classes Welfare - SBCW	M. B. Popat	17 Match 1974	21 February 1975	INC
Cabinet Minister: Nomadic Tribesl Department; Vimukta Jati	Yashwantrao Mohite	13 March 1972	4 April 1973	INC
Cabinet Minister: Nomadic Tribesl Department; Vimukta Jati	Shankarrao Chavan	4 April 1973	17 Match 1974	INC
Cabinet Minister: Nomadic Tribesl Department; Vimukta Jati	Vasantrao Patil	17 Match 1974	21 February 1975	INC
Cabinet Minister: Soil and Water Conservation	Vasantrao Naik CM	13 March 1972	4 April 1973	INC
Cabinet Minister: Soil and Water Conservation	Narendra Mahipati Tidke	4 April 1973	17 Match 1974	INC
Cabinet Minister: Soil and Water Conservation	Vasantrao Naik CM	17 Match 1974	21 February 1975	INC
Cabinet Minister: Marketing	A. R. Antulay	13 March 1972	4 April 1973	INC
Cabinet Minister: Marketing	Vasantrao Patil	4 April 1973	17 Match 1974	INC
Cabinet Minister: Marketing	Rafique Zakaria	17 Match 1974	21 February 1975	INC
Cabinet Minister: Tourism	Vasantrao Naik CM	13 March 1972	4 April 1973	INC
Cabinet Minister: Tourism	Yashwantrao Mohite	4 April 1973	17 Match 1974	INC
Cabinet Minister: Tourism	Vasantrao Patil	17 Match 1974	21 February 1975	INC
Cabinet Minister: Skill Development, Employment and Entrepreneurship	Anant Namjoshi	13 March 1972	4 April 1973	INC
Cabinet Minister: Skill Development, Employment and Entrepreneurship	Rafique Zakaria	4 April 1973	17 Match 1974	INC
Cabinet Minister: Skill Development, Employment and Entrepreneurship	A. R. Antulay	17 Match 1974	21 February 1975	INC
Cabinet Minister: Animal Husbandry Department; Dairy Development	Shankarrao Chavan	13 March 1972	4 April 1973	INC
Cabinet Minister: Animal Husbandry Department; Dairy Development	M. B. Popat	4 April 1973	17 Match 1974	INC
Cabinet Minister: Animal Husbandry Department; Dairy Development	Yashwantrao Mohite	17 Match 1974	21 February 1975	INC
Cabinet Minister: Fisheries Department	A. R. Antulay	13 March 1972	4 April 1973	INC
Cabinet Minister: Fisheries Department	Madhukar Dhanaji Chaudhari	4 April 1973	17 Match 1974	INC
Cabinet Minister: Fisheries Department	Vasantrao Patil	17 Match 1974	21 February 1975	INC
Cabinet Minister: Culture Affairs	Vasantrao Patil	13 March 1972	4 April 1973	INC
Cabinet Minister: Culture Affairs	Yashwantrao Mohite	4 April 1973	17 Match 1974	INC
Cabinet Minister: Culture Affairs	Shankarrao Chavan	17 Match 1974	21 February 1975	INC
Cabinet Minister: Forests Department	Shankarrao Chavan	13 March 1972	4 April 1973	INC
Cabinet Minister: Forests Department	Madhukar Dhanaji Chaudhari	4 April 1973	17 Match 1974	INC
Cabinet Minister: Forests Department	Narendra Mahipati Tidke	17 Match 1974	21 February 1975	INC
Cabinet Minister: Higher and Technical Education	Pratibha Patil	13 March 1972	4 April 1973	INC
Cabinet Minister: Higher and Technical Education	A. R. Antulay	4 April 1973	17 Match 1974	INC
Cabinet Minister: Higher and Technical Education	Vasantrao Patil	17 Match 1974	21 February 1975	INC
Cabinet Minister: Textiles	Vasantrao Patil	13 March 1972	4 April 1973	INC
Cabinet Minister: Textiles	Vasantrao Naik	4 April 1973	17 Match 1974	INC
Cabinet Minister: Textiles	A. R. Antulay	17 Match 1974	21 February 1975	INC
Cabinet Minister: Tribal Development	Madhukar Dhanaji Chaudhari	13 March 1972	4 April 1973	INC
Cabinet Minister: Tribal Development	Narendra Mahipati Tidke	4 April 1973	17 Match 1974	INC
Cabinet Minister: Tribal Development	M. B. Popat	17 Match 1974	21 February 1975	INC
Cabinet Minister: Rural Development	A. R. Antulay	13 March 1972	4 April 1973	INC
Cabinet Minister: Rural Development	Vasantrao Naik CM	4 April 1973	17 Match 1974	INC
Cabinet Minister: Rural Development	Pratibha Patil	17 Match 1974	21 February 1975	INC
Cabinet Minister: Labour	Vasantrao Patil	13 March 1972	4 April 1973	INC
Cabinet Minister: Labour	Shankarrao Chavan	4 April 1973	17 Match 1974	INC
Cabinet Minister: Labour	Rafique Zakaria	17 Match 1974	21 February 1975	INC
Cabinet Minister: Other Backward Classes - OBC	Yashwantrao Mohite	13 March 1972	4 April 1973	INC
Cabinet Minister: Other Backward Classes - OBC	Pratibha Patil	4 April 1973	17 Match 1974	INC
Cabinet Minister: Other Backward Classes - OBC	Anant Namjoshi	17 Match 1974	21 February 1975	INC
Cabinet Minister: Protocol; Earthquake Rehabilitation	A. R. Antulay	13 March 1972	4 April 1973	INC
Cabinet Minister: Protocol; Earthquake Rehabilitation	Vasantrao Patil	4 April 1973	17 Match 1974	INC
Cabinet Minister: Protocol; Earthquake Rehabilitation	Shankarrao Chavan	17 Match 1974	21 February 1975	INC
Cabinet Minister: Power	M. B. Popat	13 March 1972	4 April 1973	INC
Cabinet Minister: Power	Yashwantrao Mohite	4 April 1973	17 Match 1974	INC
Cabinet Minister: Power	Rafique Zakaria	17 Match 1974	21 February 1975	INC
Cabinet Minister: Irrigation	Narendra Mahipati Tidke	13 March 1972	4 April 1973	INC
Cabinet Minister: Irrigation	Hari Govindrao Vartak	4 April 1973	17 Match 1974	INC
Cabinet Minister: Irrigation	Yashwantrao Mohite	17 Match 1974	21 February 1975	INC
Cabinet Minister: Command Area Development	Vasantrao Naik CM	13 March 1972	4 April 1973	INC
Cabinet Minister: Command Area Development	A. R. Antulay	4 April 1973	17 Match 1974	INC
Cabinet Minister: Command Area Development	Vasantrao Naik CM	17 Match 1974	21 February 1975	INC
Cabinet Minister: Horticulture	Vasantrao Naik CM	13 March 1972	4 April 1973	INC
Cabinet Minister: Horticulture	Vasantrao Patil	4 April 1973	17 Match 1974	INC
Cabinet Minister: Horticulture	Pratibha Patil	17 Match 1974	21 February 1975	INC
Cabinet Minister: Employee Guarantee	Yashwantrao Mohite	13 March 1972	4 April 1973	INC
Cabinet Minister: Employee Guarantee	Vasantrao Naik CM	4 April 1973	17 Match 1974	INC
Cabinet Minister: Employee Guarantee	A. R. Antulay	17 Match 1974	21 February 1975	INC
Cabinet Minister: Water Supply	Shankarrao Chavan	13 March 1972	4 April 1973	INC
Cabinet Minister: Water Supply	Vasantrao Naik CM	4 April 1973	17 Match 1974	INC
Cabinet Minister: Water Supply	Pratibha Patil	17 Match 1974	21 February 1975	INC
Cabinet Minister: Sanitation	Anant Namjoshi	13 March 1972	4 April 1973	INC
Cabinet Minister: Sanitation	Hari Govindrao Vartak	4 April 1973	17 Match 1974	INC
Cabinet Minister: Sanitation	Vasantrao Naik CM	17 Match 1974	21 February 1975	INC
Cabinet Minister: School Education	M. B. Popat	13 March 1972	4 April 1973	INC
Cabinet Minister: School Education	Pratibha Patil	4 April 1973	17 Match 1974	INC
Cabinet Minister: School Education	Rafique Zakaria	17 Match 1974	21 February 1975	INC
Cabinet Minister: Marathi Language	Vasantrao Patil	13 March 1972	4 April 1973	INC
Cabinet Minister: Marathi Language	Narendra Mahipati Tidke	4 April 1973	17 Match 1974	INC
Cabinet Minister: Marathi Language	Hari Govindrao Vartak	17 Match 1974	21 February 1975	INC
Cabinet Minister: Industries	A. R. Antulay	13 March 1972	4 April 1973	INC
Cabinet Minister: Industries	Yashwantrao Mohite	4 April 1973	17 Match 1974	INC
Cabinet Minister: Industries	Vasantrao Patil	17 Match 1974	21 February 1975	INC
Cabinet Minister: Public Health	Rafique Zakaria	13 March 1972	4 April 1973	INC
Cabinet Minister: Public Health	Anant Namjoshi	4 April 1973	17 Match 1974	INC
Cabinet Minister: Public Health	A. R. Antulay	17 Match 1974	21 February 1975	INC
Cabinet Minister: Ex. Servicemen Welfare	Yashwantrao Mohite	13 March 1972	4 April 1973	INC
Cabinet Minister: Ex. Servicemen Welfare	Hari Govindrao Vartak	4 April 1973	17 Match 1974	INC
Cabinet Minister: Ex. Servicemen Welfare	Vasantrao Patil	17 Match 1974	21 February 1975	INC
Cabinet Minister: Khar Land Development	Vasantrao Naik CM	13 March 1972	4 April 1973	INC
Cabinet Minister: Khar Land Development	Narendra Mahipati Tidke	4 April 1973	17 Match 1974	INC
Cabinet Minister: Khar Land Development	Vasantrao Naik CM	17 Match 1974	21 February 1975	INC

== Ministers of state ==
The initial ministry also consisted of 8 ministers of state and 1 deputy minister.

- K. P. Patil
- S. B. Patil
- S. A. Solanke
- Sharad Pawar
- G. S. Sarnayak
- Prabha Rao
- R. J. Deotale
- D. T. Rupavate
- Ramubhai Patel, Deputy Minister
