= Second Vasantdada Patil ministry =

- Ministry of Maharashtra
- Date formed: 7 March 1978
- Date dissolved: 18 July 1978

People and organisations
- Governor: Sadiq Ali
- Chief Minister: Vasantdada Patil
- Total no. of members: 13 Cabinet ministers (Incl. Chief Minister)
- Member parties: Indian National Congress (U); Congress (I)
- Status in legislature: Coalition government
- Opposition party: JNP
- Opposition leader: Legislative Assembly: Uttamrao Patil (JNP); Legislative Council: Arjunrao Kasture (?)

History
- Election: 1978
- Legislature term: 5 years
- Predecessor: V. Patil I
- Successor: Pawar I

In the aftermath of 1978 Maharashtra legislative elections, Vasantdada Patil of the Indian National Congress(U) was appointed Chief Minister. A coalition government, it consisted of members from Congress(Urs) and Congress (I), including Deputy Chief Minister Nashikrao Tirpude.

The Patil ministry continued for four months, and was replaced by Sharad Pawar's Indian Congress (Socialist) breakaway faction.

== List of ministers ==
The short served ministry consisted of 13 cabinet ministers, including Patil.

Portfolio	Minister	Took office	Left office	Party
Chief Minister: General Administration; Planning; Information and Public Relations; Urban Development; State Excise, Khar land Development; Departments or portfolios not allocated to any minister.	Vasantdada Patil	7 March 1978	18 July 1978	INC(U)
Deputy Chief Minister: Home Affairs; Jails; Information Technology; Forests, Cultural Affairs; Special Backward Classes Welfare; Earthquake Rehabilitation; Protocol	Nashikrao Tirpude	7 March 1978	18 July 1978	INC(I)
Cabinet Minister: Public Works; (Excluding Public Undertakings): Dairy Development; Other Backward Classes; Majority Welfare Development; Skill Development, Employment and Entrepreneurship	Sundarrao Solanke	7 March 1978	18 July 1978	INC(U)
Cabinet Minister: Revenue; Relief & Rehabilitation; Public Works; (Including Public Undertakings)	Madhukarrao Chaudhari	7 March 1978	18 July 1978	INC
Cabinet Minister: Cooperation; Tourism; Marathi language; Disaster Management; Horticulture; Special Assistance; Food and Drug Administration; New Townships	Prabha Rau	7 March 1978	18 July 1978	INC(I)
Cabinet Minister: Finance; Food, and Civil Supplies; Socially And Educationally *Backward Classes	Yashwantrao Mohite	7 March 1978	18 July 1978	INC
Cabinet Minister: Rural Development; Transport; Minority Development and Aukaf; Prohibition	Baburao Kale	7 March 1978	18 July 1978	INC
Cabinet Minister: Law and Judiciary; Irrigation; Social Welfare; Tribal Welfare; Vimukta Jati; Nomadic Tribes; Other Backward Bahujan Welfare	Ramrao Adik	7 March 1978	18 July 1978	INC
Cabinet Minister: Industries; Mining Department; Labour; Ports Development	Sharad Pawar	7 March 1978	18 July 1978	INC
Cabinet Minister: Energy; Sports, and Youth Services; Medical Education; Textile	Jawaharlal Darda	7 March 1978	18 July 1978	INC
Cabinet Minister: Legislative Affairs; Health and Family Welfare; Water supply; Sanitation	Shivajirao Patil Nilangekar	7 March 1978	18 July 1978	INC
Cabinet Minister: Agriculture; Command Area Development; Woman and Child Development; Employment Guarantee; Environment and Climate Change; Higher and Technical Education	Purushottam Dekate	7 March 1978	18 July 1978	INC(I)
Cabinet Minister: Housing; Animal Husbandry; Fisheries; Soil and Water Conservation	Sudhakarrao Naik	7 March 1978	18 July 1978	INC
Cabinet Minister: School Education; Ex. Servicemen Welfare; Marketing	Baliram Hiray	7 March 1978	18 July 1978	INC(I)
