= First Vasantdada Patil ministry =

- Ministry of the State of Maharashtra

People and organisations
- Head of government: Vasantdada Patil
- Member party: Congress
- Status in legislature: Coalition
- Opposition party: BJP SHS JD

History
- Election: 1972
- Legislature term: 5 Years
- Predecessor: First Shankarrao Chavan ministry
- Successor: Second Vasantdada Patil ministry

Vasantdada Patil became the Chief Minister of Maharashtra for the first time on 17 April 1977, replacing Shankarrao Chavan. The government continued until the 1978 legislative elections, after which Patil continued with his second ministry.

== List of ministers ==
The ministry consisted of the following:

Portfolio	Minister	Took office	Left office	Party
Chief Minister: General Administration; Information and Public Relations, Information Technology; Animal Husbandry; Dairy Development; Other Backward Classes; Employment Guarantee; Environment and Climate Change; Departments or portfolios not allocated to any minister.	Vasantdada Patil	17 April 1977	6 March 1978	INC
Cabinet Minister: Industries; Mining Department; Sports; Disaster Management; Vimukta Jati; Public Works; (Including Public Undertakings)	S. K. Wankhede	21 April 1977	6 March 1978	INC
Cabinet Minister: Public Works; (Excluding Public Undertakings): Socially And Educationally Backward Classes	Sundarrao Solanke	21 April 1977	6 March 1978	INC
Cabinet Minister: Revenue; Special Backward Classes Welfare; Majority Welfare Development; Textile	Madhukarrao Chaudhari	21 April 1977	6 March 1978	INC
Cabinet Minister: Energy; Planning; Legislative Affairs; New Townships	Narendra Mahipati Tidke	21 April 1977	15 August 1977	INC
Cabinet Minister: Tribal Development; Tourism; Marathi language; Woman and Child Development; Water supply; Sanitation; Ex. Servicemen Welfare; Other Backward Bahujan Welfare	Nashikrao Tirpude	21 April 1977	6 March 1978	INC
Cabinet Minister: Finance; Earthquake Rehabilitation; Special Assistance	Yashwantrao Mohite	21 April 1977	6 March 1978	INC
Cabinet Minister: Agriculture; Command Area Development; Ports Development	Hari Govindrao Vartak	21 April 1977	6 March 1978	INC
Cabinet Minister: School Education; Minority Development and Aukaf	Pratibha Patil	21 April 1977	6 March 1978	INC
Cabinet Minister: Labour; Relief & Rehabilitation	S. B. Patil	21 April 1977	6 March 1978	INC
Cabinet Minister: Home Affairs; Youth Service; Horticulture	Sharad Pawar	21 April 1977	6 March 1978	INC
Cabinet Minister: Forests; Nomadic Tribes	R. J. Deotale	21 April 1977	6 March 1978	INC
Cabinet Minister: Urban Development; Marketing; Medical Education	Ratnappa Kumbhar	21 April 1977	6 March 1978	INC
Cabinet Minister: Social Welfare; Cultural Affairs, Skill Development, Employment and Entrepreneurship	Dadasaheb Rupwate	21 April 1977	6 March 1978	INC
Cabinet Minister: Rural Development; Food and Drug Administration	K. M. Patil	21 April 1977	6 March 1978	INC
Cabinet Minister: Irrigation	Shivajirao Patil Nilangekar	21 April 1977	6 March 1978	INC
Cabinet Minister: Cooperation; Soil and Water Conservation	Shivajirao Girdhar Patil	21 April 1977	6 March 1978	INC
Cabinet Minister: Food and Civil Supplies	S. D. Gedam	21 April 1977	6 March 1978	INC
Cabinet Minister: Public Health and Family Welfare	Govindrao Sarnayak	21 April 1977	6 March 1978	INC
Cabinet Minister: Transport; Jails	Baburao Kale	21 April 1977	6 March 1978	INC
Cabinet Minister: Law and Judiciary; Fisheries; Khar Lands Development; Protocol	Husain Dalwai	21 April 1977	6 March 1978	INC
Cabinet Minister: Housing; Mumbai Metropolitan Region Development Authority; Higher Education and Technical Education	Vasant Hoshing	21 April 1977	6 March 1978	INC
Cabinet Minister: Prohibition; Excise; Printing Presses; Small Savings,	Shankarrao Rakh	21 April 1977	6 March 1978	INC
