= Girgaon Assembly constituency =

Former constituency of the Maharashtra legislative assembly in India

Coordinates: 18.957°N 72.820°E

Girgaon
- Former constituency for the Maharashtra Legislative Assembly

Constituency details
- Country: India
- Region: Western India
- State: Maharashtra
- Established: 1955
- Abolished: 1978

Girgaon Vidhan Sabha seat (formerly Girgaum) was one of the seats in Maharashtra Legislative Assembly in India from 1962 to 1978. It was made defunct after the constituency map of India was redrawn around 1975.

== Members of Legislative Assembly ==
Year	Member	Party
1957	Atre Prahlad Keshav	Independent politician
1962	Anant Namjoshi	Indian National Congress
1967	Anant Namjoshi	Indian National Congress
1972	Pramod Navalkar	Shiv Sena
1978 onwards: Constituency defunct

== Election results ==
=== Assembly Election 1972 ===
1972 Maharashtra Legislative Assembly election : Girgaon
Party	Candidate	Votes	%	±%
SS	Pramod Navalkar	25,636	50.76%	New
INC	Khadikar Y. Vinayak	24,867	49.24%	▲6.11
Margin of victory		769	1.52%	▼4.65
Turnout		51,390	67.22%	▼6.07
Total valid votes		50,503		
Registered electors		76,447		▼0.99
SS gain from INC		Swing	▲7.63	

=== Assembly Election 1967 ===
1967 Maharashtra Legislative Assembly election : Girgaon
Party	Candidate	Votes	%	±%
INC	Anant Namjoshi	23,572	43.13%	▼5.42
PWPI	A. Pendse	20,198	36.95%	New
ABJS	G. Khare	5,972	10.93%	▼0.71
SWA	J. C. Gandhi	3,679	6.73%	▲4.60
Independent	B. R. Shankarsheth	841	1.54%	New
Independent	P. Bakhale	394	0.72%	New
Margin of victory		3,374	6.17%	▼15.84
Turnout		56,588	73.29%	▲9.42
Total valid votes		54,656		
Registered electors		77,209		▼0.70
INC hold		Swing	▼5.42	

=== Assembly Election 1962 ===
1962 Maharashtra Legislative Assembly election : Girgaon
Party	Candidate	Votes	%	±%
INC	Anant Namjoshi	24,107	48.55%	▲9.55
Independent	Govind Moreshwar Pendse	13,178	26.54%	New
ABJS	Dattaprasannasadashiv Katdare	5,777	11.63%	New
PSP	Damodar Motiram Vagal	3,504	7.06%	New
Independent	Chandravati Krishnarao Bengeri	1,882	3.79%	New
SWA	Yoganand	1,059	2.13%	New
Margin of victory		10,929	22.01%	▲1.23
Turnout		51,917	66.77%	▼11.60
Total valid votes		49,657		
Registered electors		77,750		▲12.87
INC gain from Independent		Swing	▼11.23	

=== Assembly Election 1957 ===
1957 Bombay State Legislative Assembly election : Girgaum
Party	Candidate	Votes	%	±%
Independent	Atre Prahlad Keshav	31,077	59.78%	New
INC	Modi Sulochana Mohanlal	20,273	38.99%	New
Independent	Bengeri Chandrawati Krishnarao	639	1.23%	New
Margin of victory		10,804	20.78%	
Turnout		51,989	75.47%	
Total valid votes		51,989		
Registered electors		68,886		
Independent gain from INC		Swing		

== See also ==
- List of constituencies of Maharashtra Legislative Assembly
