= First Shankarrao Chavan ministry =

- Ministry of Maharashtra
- Date formed: 21 February 1975
- Date dissolved: 16 April 1977

People and organisations
- Governor: Ali Yavar Jung (1975-76)
- Chief Minister: Shankarrao Chavan
- Total no. of members: 14 Cabinet ministers (Incl. Chief Minister)
- Member parties: Congress
- Status in legislature: Majority government
- Opposition party: PWPI; BJS
- Opposition leader: Legislative Assembly: Dinkar Patil (PWPI); Legislative Council: Uttamrao Patil (BJS)

History
- Predecessor: V. Naik III
- Successor: V. Patil I

Shankarrao Chavan was appointed as Chief Minister of Maharashtra for the first time on 21 February 1975, replacing Vasantrao Naik. His first ministry lasted till 16 April 1977, and was succeeded by Vasantdada Patil's ministry.

== Government formation ==
After Congress securing a supermajority in 1972 legislative elections, the incumbent chief minister Vasantrao Naik had continued in his office. After 11 years as head of government, Naik resigned in 1975. Chavan, MLA from Bhokar was minister of irrigation and power in Naik's cabinet, and was selected to succeed Naik.

Chavan resigned in April 1977, after Congress lost several Lok Sabha seats in 1977 Indian general election, and was replaced by his irrigation minister, Vasantdada Patil. After briefly serving as Indian minister of home affairs, Chavan would be appointed chief minister for the second time in March 1986. His son, Ashok Chavan served in the same office between 2008 and 2010.

== List of ministers ==
Chavan's ministry contained 14 cabinet ministers, alongside other junior ministers. Three of his ministers - Vasantdada Patil, A. R. Antulay, and Sharad Pawar - later served as Maharashtra chief ministers; while Pratibha Patil was elected President of India from 2007 to 2012.

The initial ministry consisted of the following:

| Portfolio | Minister | Took office | Left office | Party |
|---|---|---|---|---|
| Chief Minister: General Administration; Home; Planning, Energy, Information and Publicity; Information Technology; Marathi language, Earthquake Rehabilitation, Horticulture, Tourism (21 February 1975 – 5 May 1976); Command Area Development Departments or portfolios not allocated to any minister. | Shankarrao Chavan | 21 February 1975 | 16 April 1977 | INC |
| Cabinet Minister: Irrigation, Prohibition; Excise; Water supply; Sanitation, Disaster Management, Special Backward Classes Welfare, Majority Welfare Development, Tribal Development, Special Assistance | Vasantdada Patil | 21 February 1975 | 16 April 1977 | INC |
| Cabinet Minister: Finance, Small Savings, Cultural Affairs, Sports and Youth Services | M. D. Choudhari | 21 February 1975 | 16 April 1977 | INC |
| Cabinet Minister: Industries, Printing Presses; Legislative Affairs, Other Backward Classes | N. M. Tidke | 21 February 1975 | 16 April 1977 | INC |
| Cabinet Minister: Revenue, Relief & Rehabilitation, Urban Development, New Townships, Tourism (05 May 1976 – 16 April 1977; Protocol, and; Minority Development and Aukaf (21 February 1975 – 23 February 1976); Textile | Rafiq Zakaria | 21 February 1975 | 16 April 1977 | INC |
| Cabinet Minister: Cooperation (21 February 1975 – 23 February 1976); Public Works; (Including Public Undertakings), MSRTC, Nomadic Tribes, Ports Development, Medical Education | Yashwantrao Mohite | 21 February 1975 | 16 April 1977 | INC |
| Cabinet Minister: Buildings; Communication, Housing, (21 February 1975 – 13 September 1976); Khar Lands Development; Law and Judiciary; Public Works; (Excluding Public Undertakings): Ex. Servicemen Welfare, Marketing, Mining Department, | A. R. Antulay | 21 February 1975 | 16 April 1977 | INC |
| Cabinet Minister: Public Health; Social Welfare; Special Assistance; Woman and Child Development (21 February 1975 – 23 February 1976); Socially And Educationally Backward Classes; Higher and Technical Education, Housing (13 September 1976 – 16 April 1977) | Pratibha Patil | 21 February 1975 | 16 April 1977 | INC |
| Cabinet Minister: Labour; Animal Husbandry; Dairy Development; Fisheries | S. B. Patil | 21 February 1975 | 16 April 1977 | INC |
| Cabinet Minister: Rural Development, Soil and Water Conservation; Skill Development, Employment and Entrepreneurship | Sundarrao Solanke | 21 February 1975 | 16 April 1977 | INC |
| Cabinet Minister: Agriculture; Environment and Climate Change; Co-operation (23 February 1976 – 16 April 1977) | Sharad Pawar | 21 February 1975 | 16 April 1977 | INC |
| Cabinet Minister: Forest; Transport; Jails; Vimukta Jati | R. J. Deotale | 21 February 1975 | 16 April 1977 | INC |
| Cabinet Minister: Food and Civil Supplies; Food and Drug Administration; Other Backward Bahujan Welfare | Ratnappa Kumbhar | 21 February 1975 | 16 April 1977 | INC |
| Cabinet Minister: School Education; Employment Guarantee, Woman and Child Development (23 February 1976 – 16 April 1977); Minority Development and Waqfs (23 February 1976 – 16 April 1977) | Prabha Rau | 21 February 1975 | 16 April 1977 | INC |
