= Hari Govindrao Vartak =

Indian politician

Hari Govindrao Vartak (February 9, 1914− October 7, 1998) also known as Bhausaheb Vartak was a social activist and politician from Maharashtra, who served as the cabinet minister in the ministry of Vasantrao Naik, handling the portfolio of Public health, Salt land and fishing. He also served as the Revenue Minister in the Maharashtra government.

The Government of India honoured him in 1991, with the award of Padma Shri, the fourth highest Indian civilian award for his contributions to the society.

He was from the Indian National Congress party. He won the 1962 Maharashtra Legislative Assembly election from Bassein assembly seat.
