= Anant Namjoshi =

Indian politician

Anant Namjoshi was a politician in Maharashtra state in India, in 1960s and 1970s.

He started his career with Congress Party, and was elected from Girgaon to the state assembly in 1962 and 1967. In 1972, he entered Vidhan Sabha from Khetwadi seat. He was education minister in Vasantrao Naik's government in 1970s.

In 1978, he joined Janata Party with his fellow MLA Mohanlal Popat. But he did not take any further part in electoral politics. He was Professor of Botany at the Podar Ayurvedic College. His belief in Ayurveda led him to do a lot of research on Ayurveda and its effects on daily life and immunity. He especially looked for answers to Parkinsons disease in Ayurveda. He run a science laboratory in Girgaum, Mumbai and worked with the beauty industry. He continued to grow a family business he inherited from his father. The household name "Dhobi Ink" was synonymous with permanent ink for the laundry industry and continues to be in the market. The brand "Dhobi Ink" started in 1930.
