= First Yashwantrao Chavan ministry (Maharashtra) =

- Ministry of Maharashtra
- Date formed: 1 May 1960
- Date dissolved: 7 March 1962

People and organisations
- Governor: Sri Prakasa
- Chief Minister: Yashwantrao Chavan
- Total no. of members: 26; 14 Cabinet ministers (Incl. Chief Minister); 12 deputy ministers
- Member parties: Congress
- Status in legislature: Majority government
- Opposition party: SCF; CPI
- Opposition leader: Legislative Assembly: Ramchandra Bhandare (SCF); Legislative Council: Madhavrao Bayaji Gaikwad (CPI)

History
- Predecessor: Y. Chavan II (Bombay State)
- Successor: Y. Chavan II (Maharashtra)

Yashwantrao Chavan was the chief minister of Bombay State until its bifurcation into Maharashtra and Gujarat on 1 May 1960. Chavan became the first chief minister of Maharashtra from that day. His government continued till 1962 legislative elections, after which Chavan was sworn in for a second term.

== List of ministers ==
The ministry consisted of 14 cabinet ministers.

Cabinet
Portfolio	Minister	Took office	Left office	Party
Chief Minister: General Administration; Home, Planning, Information and Public Relations, Information Technology; Industries; Mining Department; Majority Welfare; Departments not allocated to any minister	Yashwantrao Chavan	1 May 1960	7 March 1962	INC
Cabinet Minister: Public Works; Protocol; Buildings; Communications; Culture Affairs; Textiles; Ex. Servicemen Welfare	Marotrao Kannamwar	1 May 1960	7 March 1962	INC
Cabinet Minister: Law and Judiciary; Labour; Marketing; Sanitation	Shantilal Shah	1 May 1960	7 March 1962	INC
Cabinet Minister: Revenue; Relief & Rehabilitation; Ports Development; Water Supply; Marathi Language	Vasantrao Naik	1 May 1960	7 March 1962	INC
Cabinet Minister: Rural Development; Forests; Special Backward Classes Welfare; Employment Guarantee; Khar Land Development	B. G. Gadhe	1 May 1960	7 March 1962	INC
Cabinet Minister: Finance, Parliamentary Affairs; Soil and Water Conservation; Command Area Development	S. K. Wankhede	1 May 1960	7 March 1962	INC
Cabinet Minister: School Education; Medical Education; Higher and Technical Education; Environment and Climate Change; Other Backward Classes	Balasaheb Desai	1 May 1960	7 March 1962	INC
Cabinet Minister: Food, Civil Supplies & Consumer Protection, Housing, Printing Presses, Minority Development and Aukaf; Fisheries	S. G. Kazi	1 May 1960	7 March 1962	INC
Cabinet Minister: Cooperation; Special Assistance; Sports and Youth Welfare; Nomadic Tribesl Department; Vimukta Jati	Balasaheb Shivram Bharde	1 May 1960	7 March 1962	INC
Cabinet Minister: Agriculture; Horticulture; Transport; Disaster Management; Animal Husbandry Department; Dairy Development	P. K. Sawant	1 May 1960	7 March 1962	INC
Cabinet Minister: Prohibition; State Excise; Social Welfare; Socially and Educationally Backward Classes; Tribal Development	T. R. Narawane	1 May 1960	7 March 1962	INC
Cabinet Minister: Irrigation; Power / Energy; Food and Drug Administration; Rural Development	Shankarrao Chavan	1 May 1960	7 March 1962	INC
Cabinet Minister: Public Health, Small Savings; Tourism; Earthquake Rehabilitation	Homi J. H. Taleyarkhan	1 May 1960	7 March 1962	INC
Cabinet Minister: Urban Development; Woman and Child Development; Skill Development, Employment and Entrepreneurship	D. Z. Palaspagar	1 May 1960	7 March 1962	INC
