= Yashwantrao Mohite =

Indian politician (1920–2009)

Yashwantrao Jijoba Mohite (7 November 1920 – 22 August 2009), aka Bhau, was an Indian politician, a former member of the Lok Sabha from 1980 to 1984 and MLA from Karad, Maharashtra from 1952 to 1980 from Indian National Congress.

When he was taking education in Kolhapur, he participated in the Indian freedom struggle. He was also one of founders of Peasants and Workers Party of India in 1947. In 1952, he became MLA from Karad (south) assembly constituency but resigned from the post as a part of agitation for demand of separate Maharashtra state.

He was re-elected as a MLA from Majdur Kisan Party in 1957. However, in 1960 he joined the Congress and won assembly elections of 1962, 1967, 1972 and 1978. Mohite was deputy home minister (1960), deputy agriculture minister (1963), cabinet minister for housing development and transport (1967), cooperative minister (1969), cooperative and food and public distribution minister (1972) and finance minister (1975 and 1978) in Maharashtra Government.

== Family ==
He is survived by one son (Dr Indrajit Mohite) and one daughter (Arundhati Savant).
