= Aditi Tatkare =

Indian politician

Cabinet Minister Government of Maharashtra
- Incumbent
- Assumed office 15 December 2024
- Minister: Women and Child Development
- Chief Minister: Devendra Fadnavis
- Deputy CM: Eknath Shinde; Ajit Pawar (till his death); Sunetra Pawar (from 2026)
- Preceded by: Herself

Cabinet Minister Government of Maharashtra
- In office 2 July 2023 – 26 November 2024
- Minister: Women and Child Development
- Chief Minister: Eknath Shinde
- Deputy CM: Devendra Fadnavis; Ajit Pawar
- Guardian Minister: Gondia district (21 June 2024 - 26 November 2024)
- Preceded by: Mangal Lodha
- Succeeded by: Herself

Minister of State Government of Maharashtra
- In office 30 December 2019 – 29 June 2022
- Minister: Law and Judiciary; Industries; Mining Department; Tourism; Horticulture; Sports and Youth Welfare; Protocol; Information and Public Relations; Ports Development; Additional charge on 27th June 2022; Khar land Development; Additional charge on 27th June 2022; Special Assistance; Additional charge on 27th June 2022; Cultural Affairs; Additional charge on 27th June 2022; School Education; Additional charge on 27th June 2022
- Chief Minister: Uddhav Thackeray
- Deputy CM: Ajit Pawar
- Guardian Minister: Raigad district
- Preceded by: Ranjit Patil; Atul Moreshwar Save; Sadabhau Khot; Madan Madhukarrao Yerawar

Member of Legislative Assembly Maharashtra
- Incumbent
- Assumed office 26 November 2019
- Preceded by: Avdhoot Tatkare
- Constituency: Shrivardhan

Personal details
- Born: Aditi Sunil Tatkare; March 16, 1988 (age 38) Mumbai, Maharashtra, India
- Party: Nationalist Congress Party (2024–present)
- Other political affiliations: Nationalist Congress Party (Ajit Pawar faction) (2023–2024); Nationalist Congress Party (till 2023)
- Relations: Tatkare family
- Parent(s): Sunil Tatkare (father); Varda Tatkare (mother)
- Education: University of Mumbai (BA, MA)

Aditi Varda Sunil Tatkare (born 16 March 1988) is an Indian politician from Maharashtra, affiliated with the Nationalist Congress Party. She currently serves as the Cabinet Minister for Women and Child Development in the Government of Maharashtra. She has been serving as the Member of the Legislative Assembly for Shrivardhan since 2019.

== Early life and education ==
Tatkare was born on 16 March 1988 in Mumbai to Sunil Tatkare, a senior politician from Raigad, and Varda Tatkare. She grew up in Kolad and Roha in Raigad district. She completed a Bachelor of Arts in Political Science from Jai Hind College in 2009 and a Master of Arts in Political Science from the University of Mumbai in 2011.

== Political career ==
Tatkare began her political journey by serving as the President of the Raigad District Council from 2017 to 2019.

In 2019, she was elected as the Member of the Legislative Assembly for the Shrivardhan constituency, succeeding her cousin Avadhut Tatkare, and was re-elected in 2024. From 30 December 2019 to 29 June 2022, she served as Minister of State in the Thackeray government with portfolios including Law and Judiciary, Industries, Mining, Tourism, Horticulture, Sports and Youth Welfare, Protocol and Information and Public Relations. She was also the Guardian Minister for Raigad district from 2020 to 2022. On 27 June 2022, she was given additional charge of Ports Development, Khar Land Development, Special Assistance, Cultural Affairs, and School Education for a brief period until 29 June 2022.

On 2 July 2023, following the Nationalist Congress Party split, she was appointed as the Cabinet Minister for Women and Child Development in the Shinde-Fadnavis government and continues in the same role in the Third Fadnavis ministry from December 2024. She also served as the Guardian Minister of Gondia district from 21 June 2024 to 26 November 2024.

As part of her role, she oversees the Mukhyamantri Majhi Ladki Bahin Yojana, a Maharashtra government scheme providing financial assistance to economically disadvantaged women. During her tenure, audits were conducted to identify ineligible beneficiaries, including duplicate accounts, male applicants, and overlapping beneficiaries of other schemes. Reports indicate that over 26 lakh ineligible accounts were identified and removed, and over 12,000 accounts of men who allegedly received benefits intended for women were scrutinized to prevent misuse. She has also issued clarifications that the scheme’s criteria remain unchanged.

== Personal life ==
Tatkare belongs to the Tatkare political family of Raigad district in Maharashtra. She is the daughter of Sunil Tatkare, who serves as a Member of Parliament representing the Raigad constituency. Her elder brother, Aniket Tatkare, has served as a Member of the Legislative Council representing the Raigad–Ratnagiri–Sindhudurg Local Authorities constituency.

Her uncle, Anil Tatkare, has also held the same position in the Legislative Council. Her cousin, Avadhut Tatkare, has served as a Member of the Maharashtra Legislative Assembly for Shrivardhan.

She is unmarried.
