= Aniket Tatkare =

Indian politician

Member of Maharashtra Legislative Council
- Incumbent
- Assumed office 22 June 2026
- Preceded by: Vacant
- In office 1 June 2018 – 31 May 2024
- Preceded by: Anil Tatkare
- Succeeded by: Vacant
- Constituency: Raigad–Ratnagiri–Sindhudurg Local Authorities

Personal details
- Born: Aniket Sunil Tatkare; October 15, 1982 (age 43) Mumbai, Maharashtra, India
- Party: Nationalist Congress Party (2024–present)
- Other political affiliations: Nationalist Congress Party (Ajit Pawar faction) (2023–2024); Nationalist Congress Party (till 2023)
- Spouse: Vedanti Tatkare (m. 2008)
- Relations: Tatkare family
- Children: 2
- Parent(s): Sunil Tatkare (father); Varda Tatkare (mother)
- Education: University of Mumbai (B.Sc.)

Aniket Sunil Tatkare (born 15 October 1982) is an Indian politician from Maharashtra, associated with the Nationalist Congress Party. He has been serving as a Member of the Maharashtra Legislative Council from the Raigad-Ratnagiri-Sindhudurg Local Authorities constituency since 22 June 2026. He earlier represented the same constituency from 1 June 2018 to 31 May 2024.

== Early life and education ==
Tatkare was born on 15 October 1982 in Mumbai to Sunil Tatkare, a senior politician from Raigad, and Varda Tatkare. He grew up in Kolad, Raigad. Tatkare completed his Bachelor of Science in Chemistry from K.E.S Anandibai Pradhan Science College, Nagothane in 2003.

== Political career ==
Tatkare began his political career with the Nationalist Congress Party. In May 2018, he was elected to the Maharashtra Legislative Council from the Raigad-Ratnagiri-Sindhudurg Local Authorities constituency, securing 421 votes and defeating his rival Rajeev Sabale of Shiv Sena, who received 221 votes. He succeeded his uncle, Anil Tatkare, in this position and represented the constituency until 31 May 2024.

Following the split in the NCP in 2023, Tatkare aligned himself with the Ajit Pawar-led faction of the party.

In June 2026, Tatkare was elected unopposed to the Maharashtra Legislative Council for a second term representing the same constituency.

== Controversies ==
In 2012, a Public Interest Litigation (PIL) was filed in the Bombay High Court seeking a CBI investigation into allegations of illegal land acquisition involving Tatkare and his family. The petition claimed large-scale land purchases in Raigad district were made through several private companies.

Media reports have also noted the family’s involvement in real estate, cooperative institutions, and directorships in companies engaged in agriculture, infrastructure, and hospitality.

== Personal life ==
Tatkare belongs to the Tatkare political family of Raigad district. His father, Sunil Tatkare, is a senior NCP leader and Member of Parliament. His younger sister, Aditi Tatkare, is a Member of the Maharashtra Legislative Assembly and currently serves as the Minister for Women and Child Development in the Government of Maharashtra. His uncle, Anil Tatkare, and cousin, Avadhut Tatkare, are also active in politics.

He is married to Vedanti Tatkare, and the couple has two sons.
