= Prithviraj Chavan ministry =

Indian government ministry, 2010–2014

- Ministry of Maharashtra
- Prithviraj Chavan, Former Chief Minister of Maharashtra
- Date formed: 11 November 2010
- Date dissolved: 26 September 2014

People and organisations
- Head of state: Governor Kateekal Sankaranarayanan (2010-14); Governor Om Prakash Kohli; Governor C. Vidyasagar Rao (2014)
- Head of government: Prithviraj Chavan
- No. of ministers: 40
- Member parties: Congress; NCP; Independents
- Status in legislature: Coalition
- Opposition party: Bharatiya Janata Party; Shiv Sena
- Opposition leader: Eknath Khadse (Legislative Assembly); Pandurang Fundkar (Legislative Council) (2010-11); Vinod Tawde (Legislative Council) (2011-14)

History
- Election: 2009
- Outgoing election: 2014
- Legislature term: 5 years
- Predecessor: Second Ashok Chavan ministry
- Successor: First Fadnavis ministry

Representation of cabinet ministers by party
1. Indian National Congress (49.0%)
2. Nationalist Congress Party (46.0%)
3. Independent (5.00%)

Prithviraj Chavan was sworn in as the Chief Minister of Maharashtra on 11 November 2010. The following is his cabinet. The government consisted of Chavan's Congress party and the Nationalist Congress Party.

The two parties had secured a majority of Maharashtra Legislative Assembly seats in the 2009 election, and a government under Congress' Ashok Chavan (No relation to Prithviraj Chavan) was formed. However, following graft allegation related to Adarsh Housing Society scam, Chavan resigned as the Chief Minister in November 2010. Subsequently, Prithviraj Chavan, then a Rajya Sabha member from Maharashtra, and Minister of State for Prime Minister's Office under Prime Minister Manmohan Singh, was chosen by the Congress to lead the Maharashtra government. He was sworn in on 11 November 2010, and subsequently, formed his only cabinet till date. The reasons cited for Chavan's appointment included his relatively corruption-free "clean image" and his lack of allegiance to any of the state's intra-party factions.

Chavan made some changes in his predecessor's cabinet, by including some new ministers and reshuffling portfolios. He also replaced Ashok Chavan's Deputy Chief Minister Chhagan Bhujbal with Ajit Pawar, who has since served as deputy to two more Chief Ministers.

The Chavan ministry served until its defeat in the 2014 Legislative Assembly election by the BJP and Shiv Sena.

== Council of Ministers ==
Prithviraj Chavan had never been a member of the state's Legislative Assembly. He had previously represented Karad in the Indian parliament's lower house from 1991 to 1999, and had been appointed to the upper house in 2002. A computer scientist by profession, Chavan had served as junior minister in the ministries of Science and Technology, Earth Sciences, Personnel, Public Grievances and Pensions, Parliamentary Affairs and as Minister of State for Prime Minister's Office. On his appointment as the Chief Minister, Chavan was elected to the State's upper house, the Legislative Council in April 2011.

Chavan appointed coalition partner NCP's Ajit Pawar as his Deputy Chief Minister. Pawar has since intermittently served as Deputy Chief Minister under both the state's next two Chief Ministers - Devendra Fadnavis (2019), and Uddhav Thackeray (Since 2019).

The cabinet consisted of 40 members, 20 each from the two coalition parties. The parties occasionally included independent members, utilizing their ministerial quotas.

== Cabinet Ministers ==
Portfolio	Minister	Took office	Left office	Party
Chief Minister; Urban Development; Housing; General Administration; Law & Judiciary; Information & Public Relations; Information Technology	Prithviraj Chavan	11 November 2010	28 September 2014	INC
Deputy Chief Minister; Finance; Planning; Energy	Ajit Pawar	11 November 2010	25 September 2012	NCP
Deputy Chief Minister; Finance; Planning; Energy	Ajit Pawar	7 December 2012	28 September 2014	NCP
Minister of Home Affairs	R. R. Patil	11 November 2010	28 September 2014	NCP
Minister of Revenue; Minister of Khar Land Development	Balasaheb Thorat	19 November 2010	28 September 2014	INC
Minister of Agriculture; Minister of Marketing	Radhakrishna Vikhe Patil	19 November 2010	28 September 2014	INC
Minister of Industries; Minister of Ports Development	Narayan Rane	19 November 2010	26 June 2014	INC
Minister of Water Resources	Sunil Tatkare	26 June 2014	28 September 2014	NCP
Minister of Water Resources	Bhaskar Jadhav	11 November 2010	28 September 2014	NCP
Minister of Public Works; Minister of Tourism	Chhagan Bhujbal	11 November 2010	28 September 2014	NCP
Minister of Non-Conventional Energy; Minister of Excise	Ganesh Naik	11 November 2010	28 September 2014	NCP
Minister of Rural Development	Jayant Patil	11 November 2010	28 September 2014	NCP
Minister of Forest; Minister of Relief & Rehabilitation; Minister of Earthquake Rehabilitation	Patangrao Kadam	19 November 2010	28 September 2014	INC
Minister of Co-operation; Minister of Parliamentary Affairs	Harshvardhan Patil	19 November 2010	28 September 2014	INC
Minister of Water Resources (Krishna Valley)	Ramraje Naik Nimbalkar	19 November 2010	11 June 2013	NCP
Minister of Water Resources (Krishna Valley)	Shashikant Shinde	11 June 2013	28 September 2014	NCP
Minister of Food, Civil Supplies & Consumer Protection	Anil Deshmukh	19 November 2010	28 September 2014	NCP
Minister of Higher & Technical Education	Rajesh Tope	19 November 2010	28 September 2014	NCP
Minister of Water Supply & Sanitation	Laxman Dhoble	11 November 2010	11 June 2013	NCP
Minister of Water Supply & Sanitation	Dilip Sopal	11 June 2013	28 September 2014	Independent
Minister of Medical Education; Minister of Horticulture	Vijaykumar Gavit	11 November 2010	19 March 2014	NCP
Minister of Medical Education; Minister of Horticulture	Jitendra Awhad	28 May 2014	28 September 2014	NCP
Minister of Public Works (MSRDC)	Jaydattaji Kshirsagar	11 November 2010	28 September 2014	NCP
Minister of Food & Drug Administration	Manohar Naik	11 November 2010	28 September 2014	NCP
Minister of Social Justice; Minister of Nomadic Tribes; Minister of Other Backward Classess	Shivajirao Moghe	19 November 2010	28 September 2014	INC
Minister of School Education	Rajendra Darda	19 November 2010	28 September 2014	INC
Minister of Textiles; Minister of Minority Development & Aukaf	Naseem Khan	19 November 2010	28 September 2014	INC
Minister of Public Health; Minister of Protocol	Suresh Shetty	19 November 2010	28 September 2014	INC
Minister of Employment Guarantee; Minister of Water Conservation	Nitin Raut	19 November 2010	28 September 2014	INC
Minister of Animal Husbandry, Dairy Development & Fisheries	Madhukarrao Chavan	19 November 2010	2 June 2014	INC
Minister of Animal Husbandry, Dairy Development & Fisheries	Abdul Sattar	2 June 2014	28 September 2014	INC
Minister of Sports & Youth Welfare	Padmakar Valvi	19 November 2010	28 September 2014	INC
Minister of Woman & Child Development	Varsha Gaikwad	19 November 2010	28 September 2014	INC
Minister of Environment; Minister of Cultural Affairs	Sanjay Deotale	19 November 2010	28 September 2014	INC
Minister of Tribal Development	Babanrao Pachpute	19 November 2010	11 June 2013	NCP
Minister of Tribal Development	Madhukar Pichad	11 June 2013	28 September 2014	NCP
Minister of Labour & Special Assistance	Hasan Mushrif	19 November 2010	28 September 2014	NCP
Minister of Transport	Prithviraj Chavan	19 November 2010	2 June 2014	INC
Minister of Transport	Madhukarrao Chavan	2 June 2014	28 September 2014	INC

== Minister of State ==
Portfolio	Minister	Took office	Left office	Party
Home Affairs; Food & Drugs Administration; Rural Development	Satej Patil	19 November 2010	28 September 2014	INC
Medical Education; Higher & Technical Education; Non-Conventional Energy	D. P. Sawant	19 November 2010	28 September 2014	INC
Finance; Planning; Energy	Rajendra Mulak	19 November 2010	28 September 2014	INC
Water Supply & Sanitation; Food, Civil Supplies & Consumer Affairs; Public Works; Tourism.	Ranjit Kamble	19 November 2010	28 September 2014	INC
Tribal Development; Labour; Horticulture	Rajendra Gavit	19 November 2010	28 September 2014	INC
General Administration; School Education; Public Health; Minority Affairs; Information & Public Relations; Culture; Women & Child Development	Fouzia Khan	19 November 2010	28 September 2014	NCP
Revenue & Rehabilitation; Cooperation; Textiles	Prakashdada Solanke	19 November 2010	11 June 2013	NCP
Housing; Industry	Sachin Ahir	19 November 2010	28 September 2014	NCP
Urban Development; Ports; Forests; Parliamentary Affairs; Sports & Youth Welfare; Law & Judiciary; Ex-Servicemen's Welfare.	Bhaskar Jadhav	19 November 2010	11 June 2013	NCP
Agriculture; Transport; Water Supply	Gulabrao Deokar	19 November 2010	11 June 2013	NCP
Agriculture	Sanjay Savkare	11 June 2013	28 September 2014	NCP
Revenue	Suresh Dhas	11 June 2013	28 September 2014	NCP
Urban Development	Uday Samant	11 June 2013	28 September 2014	NCP
Tourism	Amit Deshmukh	2 June 2014	28 September 2014	INC

== Guardian Ministers ==
Sr No.	District	Guardian_Minister	
01.	Amravati	Ajit Pawar; Deputy Chief Minister	Nationalist Congress Party
02.	Yavatmal	Ajit Pawar; Deputy Chief Minister	Nationalist Congress Party
03.	Pune	Ajit Pawar; Deputy Chief Minister	Nationalist Congress Party
04.	Ahmednagar	Balasaheb Thorat	Indian National Congress
05.	Buldhana	Balasaheb Thorat	Indian National Congress
06.	Nagpur	Balasaheb Thorat	Indian National Congress
07.	Beed	R. R. Patil	Nationalist Congress Party
08.	Gadchiroli	R. R. Patil	Nationalist Congress Party
09.	Mumbai City	R. R. Patil	Nationalist Congress Party
10.	Bhandara	Jitendra Awhad	Nationalist Congress Party
11.	Chandrapur	Jitendra Awhad	Nationalist Congress Party
12.	Kolhapur	Radhakrishna Vikhe Patil	Indian National Congress
13.	Palghar	Radhakrishna Vikhe Patil	Indian National Congress
14.	Raigad	Sunil Tatkare	Nationalist Congress Party
15.	Ratnagiri	Sunil Tatkare	Nationalist Congress Party
16.	Akola	Jayant Patil	Nationalist Congress Party
17.	Sangli	Jayant Patil	Nationalist Congress Party
18.	Aurangabad	Rajendra Darda	Indian National Congress
19.	Hingoli	Rajendra Darda	Indian National Congress
20.	Dhule	Shashikant Shinde	Indian National Congress
21.	Gondiya	Shashikant Shinde	Indian National Congress
22.	Jalgaon	Vijaykumar Gavit	Nationalist Congress Party
23.	Jalna	Patangrao Kadam	Indian National Congress
24.	Osmanabad	Patangrao Kadam	Indian National Congress
25.	Latur	Harshvardhan Patil	Indian National Congress
26.	Mumbai Suburban	Naseem Khan (politician)	Indian National Congress
27.	Nanded	Madhukarrao Chavan	Nationalist Congress Party
28.	Nandurbar	Madhukar Pichad	Nationalist Congress Party
29.	Nashik	Chhagan Bhujbal	Nationalist Congress Party
30.	Parbhani	Sanjay Deotale	Indian National Congress
31.	Satara	Suresh Shetty	Indian National Congress
32.	Solapur	Dilip Gangadhar Sopal	Nationalist Congress Party
33.	Thane	Varsha Gaikwad	Indian National Congress
34.	Washim	Varsha Gaikwad	Indian National Congress
35.	Wardha	Sachin Ahir	Nationalist Congress Party
36.	Sindhudurg	Narayan Rane	Indian National Congress

== Ministers by Party ==
Party	Cabinet Ministers	Minister of State	Total no.of Ministers
Indian National Congress	14	1	15
Nationalist Congress Party	13	1	14
Independent	2	-	2
