= Bhaskar Jadhav =

Indian politician

Member of the Maharashtra Legislative Assembly
- Incumbent
- Assumed office 2009
- Preceded by: Vinay Natu
- Constituency: Guhagar

Minister of Water Resources Government of Maharashtra
- In office 26 June 2014 – 19 October 2014
- Chief Minister: Prithviraj Chavan
- Portfolio: Water Resources

State President of the Nationalist Congress Party (Maharashtra)
- In office 15 June 2013 – 25 June 2014
- Preceded by: Madhukar Pichad
- Succeeded by: Sunil Tatkare

Minister of State Government of Maharashtra
- In office 19 November 2010 – 11 June 2013
- Chief Minister: Prithviraj Chavan
- Portfolios: Urban Development; Forest; Ports; Sports & Youth Welfare; Parliamentary Affairs; Fisheries; Law & Order

Member of the Maharashtra Legislative Council
- In office 2006–2010
- Preceded by: Anant Tare
- Succeeded by: Anil Tatkare
- Constituency: Raigad–Ratnagiri–Sindhudurg Local Authorities

Member of the Maharashtra Legislative Assembly
- In office 1995–2004
- Preceded by: Bapu Khedekar
- Succeeded by: Ramesh Kadam
- Constituency: Chiplun

Personal details
- Born: August 1, 1957 (age 69) Ratnagiri, Maharashtra, India
- Party: Shiv Sena (UBT) (2022–present)
- Other political affiliations: Shiv Sena (–2004; 2019–2022); Nationalist Congress Party (2004–2019)
- Occupation: Politician

Bhaskar Bhaurao Jadhav (born 1 August 1957) is an Indian politician from Ratnagiri, Maharashtra. He was a Member of the Legislative Assembly for Guhagar and has previously served as Cabinet Minister for Water Resources. He has also held roles as Minister of State for Urban Development, Forest, Ports, Sports & Youth Welfare, Parliamentary Affairs, Ex-Defence Welfare, Law & Order, Fisheries, and served as the Guardian Minister of Ratnagiri.

He had earlier represented the Chiplun constituency in the Maharashtra Legislative Assembly from 1995 to 2004. After disagreements with the leadership, he left Shiv Sena and contested the 2004 Assembly election from Chiplun as an independent but was unsuccessful. After the 2004 election, he joined the Nationalist Congress Party. He was later elected to the Maharashtra Legislative Council from the Raigad–Ratnagiri–Sindhudurg Local Authorities constituency, serving from 2006 to 2009. In the 2009 Assembly elections, he contested from Guhagar and went on to win the seat for four consecutive terms. He also served as the Maharashtra state president of the Nationalist Congress Party from 2013 to 2014.

In 2019, he rejoined Shiv Sena, and after the 2022 party split, he remained with Shiv Sena (UBT).

== Positions held ==
- 1992: Elected as Member of the Ratnagiri Zilla Parishad.
- 1995: Elected as Member of the Maharashtra Legislative Assembly (1st term).
- 1999: Re-elected as Member of the Maharashtra Legislative Assembly (2nd term).
- 2006: Elected as Member of the Maharashtra Legislative Council.
- 2009: Re-elected as Member of the Maharashtra Legislative Assembly (3rd term).
- 19 November 2010 – 11 June 2013: Appointed Minister of State for-
  - Urban Development
  - Forest
  - Ports
  - Sports & Youth Welfare
  - Parliamentary Affairs
  - Fisheries
  - Law & Order
- 19 November 2010 – 11 June 2013: Simultaneously served as Guardian Minister of Ratnagiri District.
- 2013: Appointed Maharashtra State President of the Nationalist Congress Party
- 26 June 2014 – 19 October 2014: Appointed Cabinet Minister of Water Resources.
- 2014: Re-elected as Member of the Maharashtra Legislative Assembly (4th term).
- 2019: Re-elected as Member of the Maharashtra Legislative Assembly (5th term).
- 2024: Re-elected as Member of the Maharashtra Legislative Assembly (6th term).
- 2024: Appointed Shiv Sena (UBT) Group Leader of the newly elected MLAs.
