= Ministry of Water Resources (Maharashtra) =

Maharashtra government ministry responsible for Water Resources

Ministry of Water Resources Government of Maharashtra
- मंत्रालय जलसंपदा विभाग, महाराष्ट्र शासन
- Seal of the state of Maharashtra

- Building of Administrative Headquarters of Mumbai

Ministry overview
- Jurisdiction: (India) Maharashtra
- Headquarters: Mantralay, Mumbai
- Ministers responsible: Radhakrishna Vikhe Patil (Godavari & Krishna Valley Development); Girish Mahajan (Vidarbh, Tapi & Konkan Development)
- Deputy Minister responsible: Vacant, TBD since 29 June 2022, Minister of State
- Ministry executive: (IAS)
- Parent department: Government of Maharashtra

The Ministry of Water Resources. is a ministry of the Government of Maharashtra. It is responsible for preparing annual plans for the development of Maharashtra state.

The Ministry is headed by a cabinet level Minister. Radhakrishna Vikhe Patil is Current Minister of Water Resources for (Godavari & Krishna Valley) and Girish Mahajan Water Resources for (Vidharbha, Tapi, Konkan)Government of Maharashtra since 21 December 2024.

== Head office ==
Minister of Water Resources मंत्री जलसंपदा विभाग
- Emblem of India

- Flag of India
- Incumbent; Radhakrishna Vikhe Patil and Girish Mahajan since 21 December 2024
- Ministry of Water Resources (Maharashtra)
- Style: The Honourable
- Abbreviation: Cabinet Minister
- Member of: State Cabinet
- Reports to: Chief Minister, Maharashtra Legislature
- Seat: Mantralaya, Mumbai
- Appointer: Governor on the advice of the Chief Minister
- Term length: 5 years
- Precursor: Devendra Fadnavis; (2022- 2024)
- Inaugural holder: Marotrao Kannamwar; (1960-1962)
- Formation: 1 May 1960
- Deputy: Vacant, TBD; since 29 June 2022

== Cabinet Ministers ==
#	Portrait	Name	Constituency	Term of office			Chief Minister	Party
Minister of Irrigation
1		Shankarrao Chavan	Bhokar	1 May 1960	7 March 1962	3 years, 207 days	Yashwantrao Chavan	Indian National Congress
1		Shankarrao Chavan	Bhokar	8 March 1962	20 November 1962	3 years, 207 days	Yashwantrao Chavan	Indian National Congress
1		Shankarrao Chavan	Bhokar	20 November 1962	24 November 1963	3 years, 207 days	Marotrao Kannamwar	Indian National Congress
2		P. K. Sawant	Chiplun	24 November 1963	5 December 1963	11 days	himself	Indian National Congress
(1)		Shankarrao Chavan	Bhokar	5 December 1963	1 March 1967	3 years, 86 days	Vasantrao Naik	Indian National Congress
3		Balasaheb Desai	Patan	1 March 1967	27 October 1969	2 years, 240 days	Vasantrao Naik	Indian National Congress
(2)		P. K. Sawant	Chiplun	27 October 1969	13 March 1972	2 years, 138 days	Vasantrao Naik	Indian National Congress
4		Narendra Tidke	Savner	13 March 1972	4 April 1973	1 year, 22 days	Vasantrao Naik	Indian National Congress
5		Hari Vartak	Vasai	4 April 1973	17 March 1974	347 days	Vasantrao Naik	Indian National Congress
6		Yashwantrao Mohite	Karad South	17 March 1974	21 February 1975	341 days	Vasantrao Naik	Indian National Congress
7		Vasantdada Patil	MLC	21 February 1975	16 April 1977	2 years, 54 days	Shankarrao Chavan	Indian National Congress
8		Shivajirao Patil Nilangekar	Nilanga	17 April 1977	7 March 1978	325 days	Vasantdada Patil	Indian National Congress
9		Ramrao Adik	MLC	7 March 1978	18 July 1978	133 days	Vasantdada Patil	Indian National Congress
(1)		Shankarrao Chavan	Bhokar	18 July 1978	17 February 1980	1 year, 214 days	Sharad Pawar	Independent
10		B. J. Khatal-Patil	Sangamner	9 June 1980	21 January 1982	1 year, 226 days	A. R. Antulay	Indian National Congress
(8)		Shivajirao Patil Nilangekar	Nilanga	21 January 1982	2 February 1983	3 years, 43 days	Babasaheb Bhosale	Indian National Congress
(8)		Shivajirao Patil Nilangekar	Nilanga	2 February 1983	5 March 1985	3 years, 43 days	Vasantdada Patil	Indian National Congress
11		Jawaharlal Darda	MLC	12 March 1985	3 June 1985	83 days	Vasantdada Patil	Indian National Congress
12		Shivajirao Deshmukh	MLC	3 June 1985	12 March 1986	282 days	Shivajirao Patil Nilangekar	Indian National Congress
(1)		Shankarrao Chavan	Bhokar	12 March 1986	26 June 1988	2 years, 106 days	himself	Indian National Congress
13		Padamsinh Patil	Osmanabad	26 June 1988	4 March 1990	6 years, 261 days	Sharad Pawar	Indian National Congress
13		Padamsinh Patil	Osmanabad	4 March 1990	25 June 1991	6 years, 261 days	Sharad Pawar	Indian National Congress
13		Padamsinh Patil	Osmanabad	25 June 1991	6 March 1993	6 years, 261 days	Sudhakarrao Naik	Indian National Congress
13		Padamsinh Patil	Osmanabad	6 March 1993	14 March 1995	6 years, 261 days	Sharad Pawar	Indian National Congress
14		Mahadeo Shivankar	Amgaon	14 March 1995	10 June 1997	2 years, 88 days	Manohar Joshi	Bharatiya Janata Party
15		Eknath Khadse	Muktainagar	10 June 1997	1 February 1999	2 years, 130 days	Manohar Joshi	Bharatiya Janata Party
15		Eknath Khadse	Muktainagar	1 February 1999	18 October 1999	2 years, 130 days	Narayan Rane	Bharatiya Janata Party
(13)		Padamsinh Patil	Osmanabad	18 October 1999	18 January 2003	3 years, 92 days	Vilasrao Deshmukh	Nationalist Congress Party
16		Sushilkumar Shinde	Solapur South	18 January 2003	1 November 2004	1 year, 288 days	himself	Indian National Congress
Minister of Water Resources
17		R. R. Patil	Tasgaon-Kavathe Mahankal	1 November 2004	9 November 2004	8 days	Vilasrao Deshmukh	Nationalist Congress Party
18		Ajit Pawar	Baramati	9 November 2004	8 December 2008	6 years, 2 days	Vilasrao Deshmukh	Nationalist Congress Party
18		Ajit Pawar	Baramati	8 December 2008	7 November 2009	6 years, 2 days	Ashok Chavan	Nationalist Congress Party
18		Ajit Pawar	Baramati	7 November 2009	11 November 2010	6 years, 2 days	Ashok Chavan	Nationalist Congress Party
19		Sunil Tatkare	Shrivardhan	11 November 2010	26 June 2014	3 years, 227 days	Prithviraj Chavan	Nationalist Congress Party
20		Bhaskar Jadhav	Guhagar	26 June 2014	19 October 2014	115 days	Prithviraj Chavan	Nationalist Congress Party
21		Devendra Fadnavis	Nagpur South West	31 October 2014	4 December 2014	34 days	himself	Bharatiya Janata Party
22		Girish Mahajan	Jamner	4 December 2014	12 November 2019	4 years, 343 days	Devendra Fadnavis	Bharatiya Janata Party
(21)		Devendra Fadnavis	Nagpur South West	23 November 2019	28 November 2019	5 days	himself	Bharatiya Janata Party
23		Chhagan Bhujbal	Yevla	28 November 2019	30 December 2019	32 days	Uddhav Thackeray	Nationalist Congress Party
24		Jayant Patil	Islampur	30 December 2019	30 June 2022	2 years, 182 days	Uddhav Thackeray	Nationalist Congress Party
25		Eknath Shinde	Kopri-Pachpakhadi	30 June 2022	9 August 2022	40 days	himself	Shiv Sena
(21)		Devendra Fadnavis	Nagpur South West	9 August 2022	5 December 2024	2 years, 182 days	Eknath Shinde	Bharatiya Janata Party
Ministry split

=== Minister of Water Resources Krishna Valley Development and Konkan Valley Development (1986-2014) ===
#	Portrait	Name	Constituency	Term of office			Chief Minister	Party
Ministry split from Ministry of Irrigation
1		Shankarrao Chavan	Bhokar	12 March 1986	26 June 1988	2 years, 106 days	himself	Indian National Congress
2		Sharad Pawar	Baramati	26 June 1988	25 June 1991	2 years, 364 days	himself	Indian National Congress
3		Sudhakarrao Naik	Pusad	25 June 1991	6 March 1993	1 year, 254 days	himself	Indian National Congress
4		Harshavardhan Deshmukh	Morshi	6 March 1993	14 March 1995	2 years, 8 days	himself	Independent
Ministry merged with Ministry of Irrigation (1995-99)
5		Ajit Pawar	Baramati	18 October 1999	18 January 2003	3 years, 92 days	Vilasrao Deshmukh	Nationalist Congress Party
6		Shivajirao Moghe	Arni	18 January 2003	1 November 2004	1 year, 288 days	Sushilkumar Shinde	Indian National Congress
7		R. R. Patil	Tasgaon-Kavathe Mahankal	1 November 2004	9 November 2004	8 days	Vilasrao Deshmukh	Nationalist Congress Party
8		Ramraje Naik Nimbalkar	Phaltan	9 November 2004	8 December 2008	8 years, 214 days	Vilasrao Deshmukh	Nationalist Congress Party
8		Ramraje Naik Nimbalkar	Phaltan	8 December 2008	7 November 2009	8 years, 214 days	Ashok Chavan	Nationalist Congress Party
8		Ramraje Naik Nimbalkar	MLC	7 November 2009	11 November 2010	8 years, 214 days	Ashok Chavan	Nationalist Congress Party
8		Ramraje Naik Nimbalkar	MLC	11 November 2010	11 June 2013	8 years, 214 days	Prithviraj Chavan	Nationalist Congress Party
9		Shashikant Shinde	Koregaon	11 June 2013	28 September 2014	1 year, 109 days	Prithviraj Chavan	Nationalist Congress Party
Ministry merged with Ministry of Water Resources (2014)

=== Minister of Water Resources – Godavari & Krishna Valley (2024-present) ===
#	Portrait	Name	Constituency	Term of office			Chief Minister	Party
1		Radhakrishna Vikhe Patil	Shirdi	15 December 2024	incumbent	1 year, 267 days	Devendra Fadnavis	Bharatiya Janata Party

=== Minister of Water Resources – Vidharbha, Tapi, Konkan (2024-present) ===
#	Portrait	Name	Constituency	Term of office			Chief Minister	Party
1		Girish Mahajan	Jamner	15 December 2024	incumbent	1 year, 267 days	Devendra Fadnavis	Bharatiya Janata Party

== Ministers of State ==
No.	Portrait	Deputy Minister (Constituency)	Term of office			Political party	Ministry	Minister	Chief Minister
No.	Portrait	Deputy Minister (Constituency)	From	To	Period	Political party	Ministry	Minister	Chief Minister
Deputy Minister of Water Resources.
Vacant			23 November 2019	28 November 2019	5 days	NA	Fadnavis II	Devendra Fadnavis	Devendra Fadnavis
01		Omprakash Babarao Kadu (MLA for Achalpur Constituency No. 42- Amravati District) (Legislative Assembly)	30 December 2019	27 June 2022	2 years, 179 days	Prahar Janshakti Party Supported Party (Shiv Sena)	Thackeray	Jayant Patil	Uddhav Thackeray
02		Satej Patil (MLC for Elected by Kolhapur Local Authorities Constituency No. 06 - Kolhapur District) (Legislative Council); Additional_Charge	27 June 2022	29 June 2022	2 days	Indian National Congress	Thackeray	Jayant Patil	Uddhav Thackeray
Vacant			30 June 2022	26 November 2024	2 years, 149 days	NA	Eknath	Eknath Shinde (2022 - 2022); Devendra Fadnavis (2022–Present)	Eknath Shinde
Vacant			21 December 2024	Incumbent	1 year, 261 days	NA	Fadnavis III	Radhakrishna Vikhe Patil (Godavari & Krishna Valley Development) (2024 – Present); Girish Mahajan (Vidarbh, Tapi & Konkan Development) (2024 – Present)	Devendra Fadnavis
