= Sunil Tatkare =

Indian politician

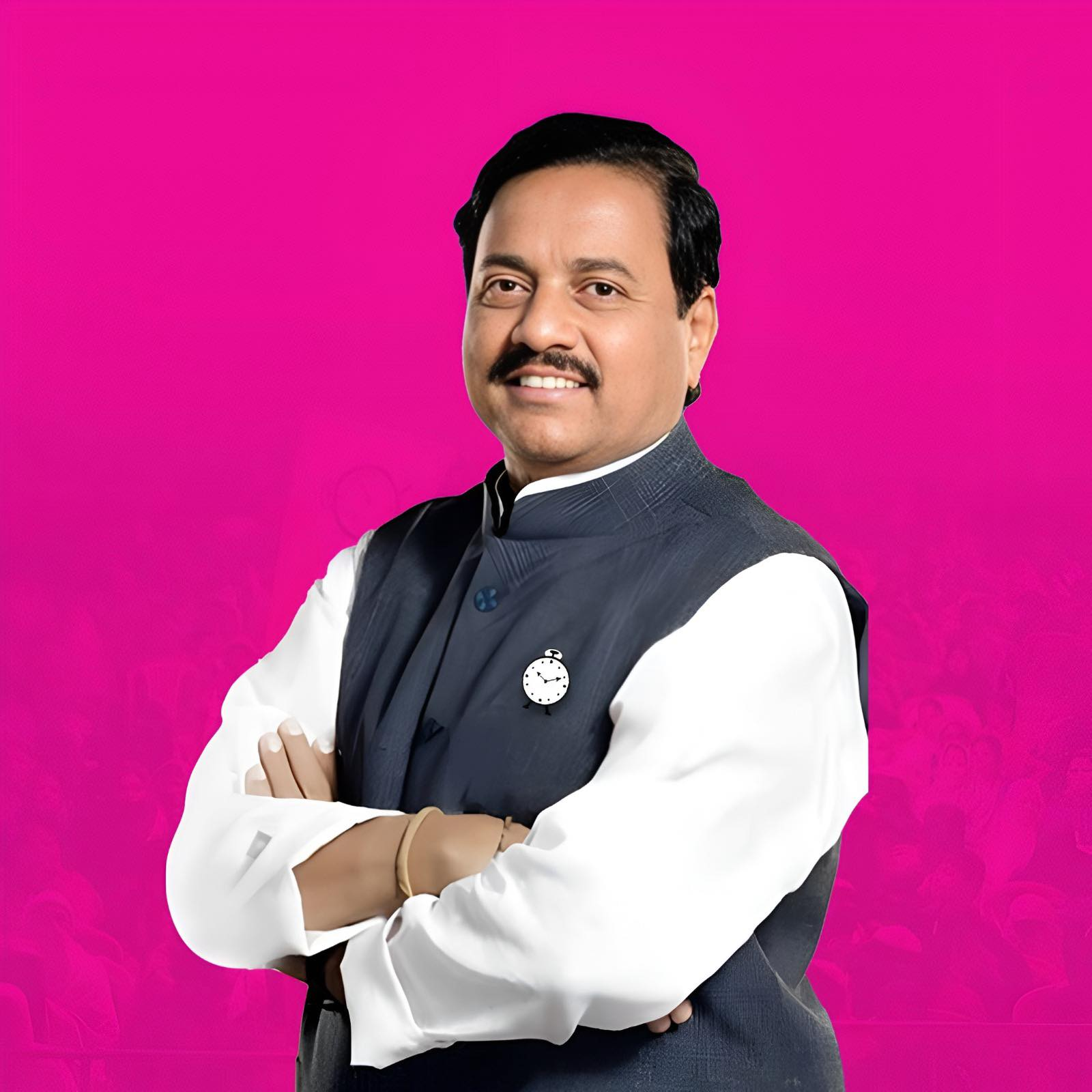
- Tatkare in 2024

Member of Parliament, Lok Sabha
- Incumbent
- Assumed office 23 May 2019
- Preceded by: Anant Geete
- Constituency: Raigad

President of Nationalist Congress Party – Maharashtra
- Incumbent
- Assumed office 3 July 2023
- President: Ajit Pawar
- Preceded by: Jayant Patil
- In office 25 June 2014 – 29 April 2018
- President: Sharad Pawar
- Preceded by: Bhaskar Jadhav
- Succeeded by: Jayant Patil

Member of Maharashtra Legislative Council
- In office 14 August 2014 – 27 July 2018
- Preceded by: Vinayak Raut
- Constituency: elected by Members of Legislative Assembly

Minister of Water Resources Government of Maharashtra
- In office 11 November 2010 – 28 September 2014
- Chief Minister: Prithviraj Chavan
- Preceded by: Ajit Pawar
- Succeeded by: Girish Mahajan

Minister of Finance & Planning Government of Maharashtra
- In office 7 November 2009 – 11 November 2010
- Chief Minister: Ashok Chavan
- Preceded by: Dilip Walse Patil
- Succeeded by: Ajit Pawar

Minister of Energy Government of Maharashtra
- In office 8 December 2008 – 7 November 2009
- Chief Minister: Ashok Chavan
- Preceded by: Dilip Walse Patil
- Succeeded by: Ajit Pawar

Minister of Food, Civil Supplies & Consumer Protection Government of Maharashtra
- In office 1 November 2004 – 8 December 2008
- Chief Minister: Vilasrao Deshmukh
- Preceded by: Sushilkumar Shinde
- Succeeded by: Ramesh Bang

Minister of State Government of Maharashtra
- In office 18 October 1999 – 18 January 2003
- Chief Minister: Vilasrao Deshmukh
- Department: Urban Development; Ports

Member of Maharashtra Legislative Assembly
- In office 2009–2014
- Preceded by: Tukaram Surve
- Succeeded by: Avdhoot Tatkare
- Constituency: Shrivardhan
- In office 1995–2009
- Preceded by: Ashok Sabale
- Succeeded by: Constituency defunct
- Constituency: Mangaon

Personal details
- Born: Sunil Dattatray Tatkare; 10 July 1955 (age 70) Sutarwadi, Roha, Raigad district
- Party: Nationalist Congress Party (2024–present)
- Other political affiliations: Nationalist Congress Party (Ajit Pawar faction) (2023–2024); Nationalist Congress Party (1999–2023); Indian National Congress (till 1999)
- Spouse: Varda Tatkare (m. 1981)
- Children: 2 (Aniket, Aditi)
- Parents: Dattatray Tatkare (father); Geeta Tatkare (mother)
- Relatives: Tatkare family

Sunil Dattatray Tatkare (born 10 July 1955) is an Indian politician currently serving as the Member of Parliament in the Lok Sabha for Raigad, Maharashtra. He is a senior leader of the Nationalist Congress Party, and has held several key ministerial portfolios in the Government of Maharashtra, including Finance, Energy, Water Resources, and Food and Civil Supplies. On 3 July 2023, he was appointed State President of the Nationalist Congress Party in Maharashtra.

== Early life and education ==
Tatkare was born on 10 July 1955 in Mumbai to Dattatray Tatkare and Geeta Tatkare. He was raised in Kolad, a town in the Raigad district of Maharashtra. His father, Dattatray Tatkare, was a respected local leader who served as the Chairperson of the Panchayat Samiti in the Raigad District Council for 17 years, laying the foundation for the family's longstanding political influence in the region.

Tatkare completed his higher secondary education at Kolad High School, and went on to pursue Inter Science at Fergusson College, Pune, although he did not complete the degree. Before entering politics, he worked as a government road contractor.

== Political career ==
Tatkare began his political journey in 1984 by joining the Indian National Congress. In 1985, he contested his first election from the Mangaon constituency for the Maharashtra Legislative Assembly but lost. In the 1990 elections, he was denied a party ticket, temporarily halting his electoral run. However, he gained ground politically when he served as the President of the Raigad Zilla Parishad from 1992 to 1995.

In 1995, he was elected to the Maharashtra Legislative Assembly from the Mangaon constituency and went on to represent it for three consecutive terms until 2009. During this period, he became a senior figure in the newly formed Nationalist Congress Party and held several key ministerial positions in the Maharashtra state government. He served as the Minister of Food and Civil Supplies from 2004 to 2008, was appointed Energy Minister in 2008, and became the Finance Minister in 2009. In 2010, he was given charge of the crucial Water Resources portfolio, a position he held until 2014.

In 2009, following the delimitation of constituencies, Tatkare contested and won from the newly formed Shrivardhan constituency, serving as its MLA until 2014. In the same year, he contested the Raigad Lok Sabha seat in the 2014 general elections, but was defeated by Shiv Sena leader and sitting MP Anant Geete.

Following this setback, he was elected to the Maharashtra Legislative Council and served as a Member of the Legislative Council from 2014 to 2018. In the 2019 general elections, he was elected as the Member of Parliament for Raigad in the Lok Sabha and retained the seat in the 2024 elections. On 3 July 2023, following the split in the NCP, he was appointed State President of the Nationalist Congress Party (Ajit Pawar faction) in Maharashtra.

== Electoral history ==
=== Member of Maharashtra Legislative Assembly ===
Year	Constituency	Party	Votes	%	Opponent		Result	Margin
1985	Mangaon	INC	28,013	41.26%	PWPI	Nilkanth Sawant	Lost	5,432
1995	Mangaon	INC	44,569	42.11%	SS	Vinod Ghosalkar	Won	13,394
1999	Mangaon	NCP	41,573	47.85%	SS	Vinod Ghosalkar	Won	7,453
2004	Mangaon	NCP	69,865	55.80%	SS	Anant Lokhande	Won	32,274
2009	Shrivardhan	NCP	66,141	47.71%	SS	Tukaram Surve	Won	10,871

=== Member of Parliament, Lok Sabha ===
Year	Constituency	Party	Votes	%	Opponent		Result	Margin
2014	Raigad	NCP	394,068	25.71%	SS	Anant Geete	Lost	2,110
2019	Raigad	NCP	486,968	47.39%	SS	Anant Geete	Won	31,438
2024	Raigad	NCP	508,352	50.17%	SS	Anant Geete	Won	82,784

== Personal life ==
Sunil Tatkare is married to Varda Tatkare. The couple has two children, Aditi and Aniket, both of whom are active in Maharashtra politics. He is the most prominent figure of the Tatkare family, which holds significant political influence in the Raigad district and Konkan region.

His daughter, Aditi Tatkare, is a Member of the Maharashtra Legislative Assembly for Shrivardhan and currently serves as the Minister for Women and Child Development in the Maharashtra government. His son, Aniket Tatkare, served as a Member of the Maharashtra Legislative Council representing the Raigad-Ratnagiri-Sindhudurg Local Authorities Constituency from 2018 to 2024.

Tatkare’s elder brother, Anil Tatkare, has also served as an MLC for the Raigad-Ratnagiri-Sindhudurg local authorities. His nephew, Avadhut Tatkare, was elected as an MLA for Shrivardhan and served a term from 2014 to 2019.

== Controversies ==
Tatkare has faced several allegations over the years. The Maharashtra Anti-Corruption Bureau (ACB) sought permission from the state government to conduct an open inquiry against him in cases relating to land grabs and disproportionate assets. The Enforcement Directorate (ED) has also initiated a probe into his alleged accumulation of wealth beyond known sources of income.
