= Avdhoot Tatkare =

Indian politician

Avadhut Tatkare
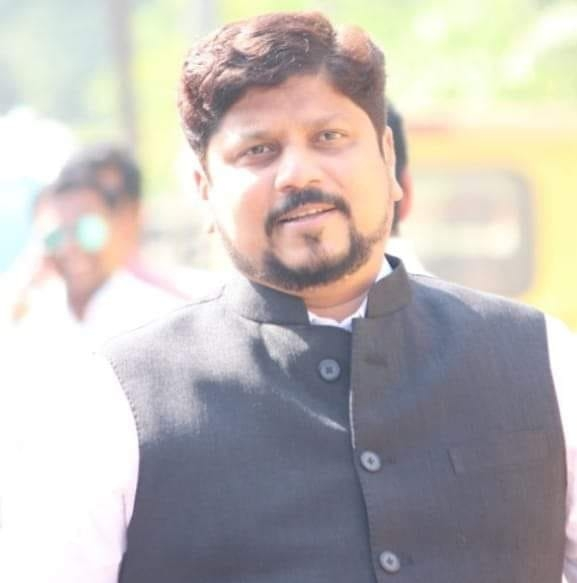
- Tatkare in 2022

Member of the Maharashtra Legislative Assembly
- In office 19 October 2014 – 24 October 2019
- Preceded by: Sunil Tatkare
- Succeeded by: Aditi Tatkare
- Constituency: Shrivardhan

President of the Roha-Ashtami Municipal Council
- In office 12 May 2009 – 11 December 2015
- Preceded by: Ratnaprabha Kapre
- Succeeded by: Samir Shedge

Personal details
- Born: Avadhut Anil Tatkare; 3 December 1978 (age 47) Mumbai, Maharashtra, India
- Party: Bharatiya Janata Party (2022–present)
- Other political affiliations: Shiv Sena (2019–2022); Nationalist Congress Party (until 2019)
- Spouse: Revati Tatkare (m. 2003)
- Relations: Tatkare family
- Children: 2
- Parent(s): Anil Tatkare (father); Shubhada Tatkare (mother)

Avadhut Anil Tatkare (born 3 December 1978) is an Indian politician from Maharashtra. He served as the Member of Legislative Assembly for Shrivardhan from 2014 to 2019. Before entering state-level politics, he was elected President of the Roha-Ashtami Municipal Council for two consecutive terms between 2009 and 2015. He has been a member of the Bharatiya Janata Party since 2022.

== Early life and background ==
Tatkare was born on 3 December 1978 in Mumbai to Anil and Shubhada Tatkare, and was raised in Roha, Raigad. His father, Anil Tatkare, served two consecutive terms as a Member of the Maharashtra Legislative Council, from 2010 to 2012 and from 2012 to 2018, representing the Raigad-Ratnagiri-Sindhudurg Local Authorities.

He hails from the Tatkare political family of Raigad. His uncle, Sunil Tatkare is the Member of Parliament for Raigad, and has previously served as a Cabinet Minister in the Government of Maharashtra.

He completed his high school education at J. M. Rathi English School & Junior College.

== Political career ==
Tatkare began his political career with the Nationalist Congress Party, serving as a member of the Roha-Ashtami Municipal Council from 2006 to 2016. During this period, he was elected as Vice President from 2006 to 2009, as the President's seat was reserved for women. He subsequently served as the President for two consecutive terms from 2009 to 2011 and from 2011 to 2015, before resigning in 2015.

In the 2014 Maharashtra Legislative Assembly elections, Tatkare was elected as the Member of Legislative Assembly for the Shrivardhan constituency, representing the NCP, succeeding his uncle, Sunil Tatkare. He has not contested any elections since his 2014 victory.

He later joined the Shiv Sena ahead of the 2019 Maharashtra Assembly elections and remained associated with the party until 2022. Following the 2022 Maharashtra political crisis, he joined the Bharatiya Janata Party.

== Personal life ==
Tatkare has been married to Revati Tatkare since 2003, and they have two sons.
