= Ramsheth Thakur =

Indian politician

Member of Parliament, Lok Sabha
- In office 1998-2004
- Preceded by: A. R. Antulay
- Succeeded by: A. R. Antulay
- Constituency: Kolaba, Maharashtra

Personal details
- Born: 2 May 1951 (age 74) Shivaji Nagar, Raigad district, Bombay State
- Party: Bharatiya Janata Party
- Other political affiliations: Peasants and Workers Party of India; Indian National Congress
- Spouse: Shakuntala
- Children: Prashant Thakur; Paresh Thakur

Ramsheth Thakur is an Indian politician. He was elected to the Lok Sabha, lower house of the Parliament of India from Kolaba, Maharashtra as a member of the Peasants and Workers Party of India.
