= Ministry of Woman and Child Development (Maharashtra) =

Government department of Maharashtra, India

Ministry Woman and Child Development Government of Maharashtra
- मंत्रालय महिला व बालविकास विभाग महाराष्ट्र शासन
- Seal of the state of Maharashtra

- Building of Administrative Headquarters of Mumbai

Agency overview
- Formed: 1960; 66 years ago
- Preceding agency: Department of School Education
- Jurisdiction: Chief Minister of Maharashtra
- Headquarters: Mantralaya, Mumbai
- Annual budget: State budget of Government of Maharashtra
- Minister responsible: Aditi Sunil Tatkare, Cabinet Minister
- Deputy Ministers responsible: Meghana Bordikar, Minister of State
- Agency executives: -, Principal Secretary; -, Joint Secretary; -, Deputy Secretary

Ministry of Woman and Child Development Department, Maharashtra is a Ministry of Government of Maharashtra.

The Ministry is headed by a cabinet level minister. Aditi Sunil Tatkare is the current Minister of Woman and Child Development.

== Head office ==
Minister of Woman and Child Development मंत्री महिला व बालविकास विभाग
- Emblem of India

- Flag of India
- Incumbent; Aditi Sunil Tatkare since 21 December 2024
- Ministry of Woman and Child Development (Maharashtra)
- Style: The Honourable
- Abbreviation: Cabinet Minister
- Member of: State Cabinet
- Reports to: Chief Minister, Maharashtra Legislature
- Seat: Mantralaya, Mumbai
- Appointer: Governor on the advice of the Chief Minister
- Term length: 5 years
- Precursor: Devendra Fadnavis (2024-2024)
- Inaugural holder: Niramala Raje Bhosale (1960-1962)
- Formation: 1 May 1960
- Deputy: Meghana Bordikar

== Cabinet Ministers ==
No.	Portrait	Minister (Constituency)	Term of office			Political party	Ministry	Chief Minister
No.	Portrait	Minister (Constituency)	From	To	Period	Political party	Ministry	Chief Minister
Minister of Woman and Child Development
01		D. S. Palaspagar (MLC for Elected by MLAs Constituency No. 19 - Bhandara District) (Legislative Council)	01 May 1960	07 March 1962	1 year, 310 days	Indian National Congress	Yashwantrao I	Yashwantrao Chavan
02		Niramala Raje Bhosale (MLA for Satara Constituency No. 268- Satara District) (Legislative Assembly)	08 March 1962	19 November 1962	256 days	Indian National Congress	Yashwantrao II	Yashwantrao Chavan
03		Shantilal Shah (MLA for Vile Parle Constituency No. 177- Mumbai Suburban District (Legislative Assembly)	20 November 1962	24 November 1963	1 year, 4 days	Indian National Congress	Kannamwar l	Marotrao Kannamwar
04		P. K. Sawant (MLA for Chiplun Constituency No. 265- Ratnagiri District) (Legislative Assembly) (Interim Chief Minister)	25 November 1962	04 December 1963	9 days	Indian National Congress	Sawant	P. K. Sawant
05		Niramala Raje Bhosale (MLA for Satara Constituency No. 268- Satara District) (Legislative Assembly)	05 December 1963	01 March 1967	3 years, 86 days	Indian National Congress	Vasantrao I	Vasantrao Naik
06		Sadashiv Govind Barve (MLA for Shivajinagar Constituency No. 209- Pune District) (Legislative Assembly)	01 March 1967	27 October 1969	2 years, 240 days	Indian National Congress	Vasantrao II	Vasantrao Naik
07		Nirmala Raje Bhosale (MLA for Satara Constituency No. 268- Satara District) (Legislative Assembly)	27 October 1969	13 March 1972	2 years, 138 days	Indian National Congress	Vasantrao II	Vasantrao Naik
08		Anant Namjoshi (MLA for Girgaon Constituency No. 185- Mumbai City District) (Legislative Assembly)	13 March 1972	04 April 1973	1 year, 32 days	Indian National Congress	Vasantrao III	Vasantrao Naik
09		Hari Govindrao Vartak (MLA for Bassein-Vasai Constituency No. 180- Palghar District (Legislative Assembly)	04 April 1973	17 Match; 1974	347 days	Indian National Congress	Vasantrao III	Vasantrao Naik
10		Pratibha Patil (MLA for Jalgaon City Constituency No. 13- Jalgaon District) (Legislative Assembly)	17 Match; 1974	21 February 1975	341 days	Indian National Congress	Vasantrao III	Vasantrao Naik
11		Pratibha Patil (MLA for Jalgaon City Constituency No. 13- Jalgaon District) (Legislative Assembly)	21 February 1975	23 February 1976	1 year, 2 days	Indian National Congress	Shankarrao I	Shankarrao Chavan
12		Prabha Rau (MLA for Pulgaon Constituency No. 41- Wardha District) (Legislative Assembly)	23 February 1976	16 April 1977	1 year, 52 days	Indian National Congress	Shankarrao I	Shankarrao Chavan
13		Nashikrao Tirpude (MLA for Bhandara Constituency No. 61- Bhandara District) (Legislative Assembly)	17 April 1977	07 March 1978	1 year, 324 days	Indian National Congress	Vasantdada I	Vasantdada Patil
14		Purushottam Dekate (MLA for Umred Constituency No. 51- Nagpur District (Legislative Assembly)	07 March 1978	18 July 1978	133 days	Indian National Congress (Indira)	Vasantdada II	Vasantdada Patil
15		Govindrao Adik (MLA for Vaijapur Constituency No. 112- Aurangabad District) (Legislative Assembly)	18 July 1978	17 February 1980	1 year, 214 days	Indian Congress (Socialist)	Pawar I	Sharad Pawar
16		Shalini Patil (MLA for Koregaon Constituency No. 257- Satara District) (Legislative Assembly)	09 June 1980	21 January 1982	1 year, 226 days	Indian National Congress	Antulay	Abdul Rahman Antulay
17		Sharadchandrika Suresh Patil (MLA for Chopda Constituency No. 10- Jalgaon District) (Legislative Assembly)	21 January 1982	02 February 1983	1 year, 12 days	Indian National Congress	Bhosale	Babasaheb Bhosale
18		Sudhakarrao Naik (MLA for Pusad Constituency No. 81- Yavatmal District) (Legislative Assembly)	07 February 1983	05 March 1985	2 years, 26 days	Indian National Congress	Vasantdada III	Vasantdada Patil
19		Surupsingh Hirya Naik (MLA for Navapur Constituency No. 04- Nandurbar District) (Legislative Assembly)	12 March 1985	03 June 1985	83 days	Indian National Congress	Vasantdada IV	Vasantdada Patil
20		Shivajirao Deshmukh (MLC for Elected by MLAs Constituency No. 18 - Sangli District) (Legislative Council)	03 June 1985	12 March 1986	282 days	Indian National Congress	Nilangekar	Shivajirao Patil Nilangekar
21		Balachandra Bhai Sawant (MLC for Elected by MLAs Constituency No. 09 - Ratnagiri District) (Legislative Council)	12 March 1986	26 June 1988	2 years, 106 days	Indian National Congress	Shankarrao II	Shankarrao Chavan
22		Vilasrao Deshmukh (MLA for Latur City Constituency No. 235- Latur District) (Legislative Assembly)	26 June 1988	03 March 1990	1 year, 250 days	Indian National Congress	Pawar II	Sharad Pawar
23		Vijaysinh Mohite-Patil (MLA for Malshiras Constituency No. 254- Solapur District) (Legislative Assembly)	04 March 1990	25 June 1991	1 year, 113 days	Indian National Congress	Pawar III	Sharad Pawar
24		Pushpatai Hirey (MLA for Dabhadi Constituency No. 74- Nashik District) (Legislative Assembly)	25 June 1991	22 February 1993	1 year, 242 days	Indian National Congress	Sudhakarrao	Sudhakarrao Naik
25		Pushpatai Hirey (MLA for Dabhadi Constituency No. 74- Nashik District) (Legislative Assembly)	06 March 1993	14 March 1995	2 years, 8 days	Indian National Congress	Pawar IV	Sharad Pawar
26		Shobhatai Fadnavis (MLA for Saoli Constituency No. 82 - Chandrapur district) (Legislative Assembly)	14 March 1995	01 February 1999	3 years, 324 days	Bharatiya Janata Party	Joshi	Manohar Joshi
27		Chandrakant Khaire (MLA for Aurangabad West Constituency No. 108- Chhatrapati Sambhaji Nagar District Also Previously Known Aurangabad District (Legislative Assembly)	01 February 1999	11 May 1999	99 days	Shiv Sena	Rane	Narayan Rane
28		Shobhatai Fadnavis (MLA for Saoli Constituency No. 82 - Chandrapur district) (Legislative Assembly)	11 May 1999; 1999	17 October 1999	159 days	Shiv Sena	Rane	Narayan Rane
29		Jaywantrao Awale (MLA for Vadgaon Maval Constituency No. 192- Pune District (Legislative Assembly)	19 October 1999	09 September 2001	1 year, 325 days	Indian National Congress	Deshmukh I	Vilasrao Deshmukh
30		Ganpatrao Deshmukh (MLA for Sangola Constituency No. 235- Solapur District (Legislative Assembly)	09 September 2001	16 January 2003	1 year, 129 days	Peasants and Workers Party of India	Deshmukh I	Vilasrao Deshmukh
31		Ranjeet Deshmukh (MLC for Elected by MLAs Constituency No. 16 - Nagpur District) (Legislative Council)	18 January 2003	01 November 2004	1 year, 295 days	Indian National Congress	Sushilkumar	Sushilkumar Shinde
32		R. R. Patil (MLA for Tasgaon-Kavathe Mahankal Constituency No. 287- Sangli District) (Legislative Assembly) (Deputy Chief Minister)	01 November 2004	09 November 2004	8 days	Nationalist Congress Party	Deshmukh II	Vilasrao Deshmukh
33		Ramraje Naik Nimbalkar (MLA for Phaltan Constituency No. 255- Satara District (Legislative Assembly)	09 November 2004	01 December 2008	4 years, 22 days	Nationalist Congress Party	Deshmukh II	Vilasrao Deshmukh
34		Madan Vishwanath Patil (MLA for Sangli Constituency No. 285- Sangli District) (Legislative Assembly)	08 December 2008	06 November 2009	333 days	Independent Supported party (Indian National Congress)	Ashok I	Ashok Chavan
35		Subhash Zanak (MLA for Risod Constituency No. 33- Washim District) (Legislative Assembly)	07 November 2009	10 November 2010	1 year, 3 days	Indian National Congress	Ashok II	Ashok Chavan
36		Varsha Gaikwad (MLA for Dharavi Constituency No. 178- Mumbai City District) (Legislative Assembly)	11 November 2010	26 September 2014	3 years, 319 days	Indian National Congress	Prithviraj	Prithviraj Chavan
37		Pankaja Munde (MLA for Parli Constituency No. 233- Beed District) (Legislative Assembly)	31 October 2014	12 November 2019	5 years, 12 days	Bharatiya Janata Party	Fadnavis I	Devendra Fadnavis
38		Devendra Fadnavis (MLA for Nagpur South West Constituency No. 52- Nagpur District) (Legislative Assembly) (Chief Minister) (In Charge)	23 November 2019	28 November 2019	5 days	Bharatiya Janata Party	Fadnavis II	Devendra Fadnavis
39		Nitin Raut (MLA for Nagpur North Constituency No. 57- Nagpur District) (Legislative Assembly)	28 November 2019	30 December 2019	32 days	Indian National Congress	Thackeray	Uddhav Thackeray
40		Yashomati Chandrakant Thakur (MLA for Teosa Constituency No. 39- Amravati District) (Legislative Assembly)	30 December 2019	29 June 2022	2 years, 181 days	Indian National Congress	Thackeray	Uddhav Thackeray
41		Eknath Shinde (MLA for Kopri-Pachpakhadi Constituency No. 147- Thane District) (Legislative Assembly) (Chief Minister) (In Charge)	30 June 2022	14 August 2022	45 days	Shiv Sena (2022–present)	Eknath	Eknath Shinde
42		Mangal Lodha (MLA for Malabar Hill Constituency No. 185- Mumbai City District) (Legislative Assembly)	14 August 2022	14 July 2023	334 days	Bharatiya Janata Party	Eknath	Eknath Shinde
43		Aditi Sunil Tatkare (MLA for Shrivardhan Constituency No. 193- Raigad District) (Legislative Assembly)	14 July 2023	26 November 2024	1 year, 135 days	Nationalist Congress Party	Eknath	Eknath Shinde
44		Devendra Fadnavis (MLA for Nagpur South West Constituency No. 52- Nagpur District) (Legislative Assembly) (Chief_Minister); In Charge	05 December 2024	21 December 2024	16 days	Bharatiya Janata Party	Fadnavis III	Devendra Fadnavis
45		Aditi Sunil Tatkare (MLA for Shrivardhan Constituency No. 193- Raigad District) (Legislative Assembly)	21 December 2024	Incumbent	1 year, 281 days	Nationalist Congress Party	Fadnavis III	Devendra Fadnavis

== Ministers of State ==
No.	Portrait	Deputy Minister (Constituency)	Term of office			Political party	Ministry	Minister	Chief Minister
No.	Portrait	Deputy Minister (Constituency)	From	To	Period	Political party	Ministry	Minister	Chief Minister
Deputy Minister of Woman and Child Development.
Vacant			23 November 2019	28 November 2019	5 days	NA	Fadnavis II	Devendra Fadnavis	Devendra Fadnavis
01		Omprakash Babarao Kadu (MLA for Achalpur Constituency No. 42- Amravati District) (Legislative Assembly)	30 December 2019	27 June 2022	2 years, 179 days	Prahar Janshakti Party Supported Party (Shiv Sena)	Thackeray	Yashomati Chandrakant Thakur	Uddhav Thackeray
02		Sanjay Bansode (MLA for Udgir Constituency No. 237- Latur District) (Legislative Assembly); Additional_Charge	27 June 2022	29 June 2022	2 days	Nationalist Congress Party	Thackeray	Yashomati Chandrakant Thakur	Uddhav Thackeray
Vacant			30 June 2022	26 November 2024	2 years, 149 days	NA	Eknath	Eknath Shinde (2022 - 2022); Mangal Lodha (2022 - 2023); Aditi Sunil Tatkare (2023 - 2024)	Eknath Shinde
03		Meghana Bordikar (MLA for Jintur Constituency No. 95- Parbhani District) (Legislative Assembly)	21 December 2024	incumbent	1 year, 281 days	Bharatiya Janata Party	Fadnavis III	Aditi Sunil Tatkare (2024 – Present)	Devendra Fadnavis
