= Ministry of Ports Development (Maharashtra) =

Maharashtra government ministry responsible for Ports Development

Ministry of Ports Development Government of Maharashtra
- मंत्रालय बंदर विकास विभाग, महाराष्ट्र शासन
- Seal of the state of Maharashtra

- Building of Administrative Headquarters of Mumbai

Ministry overview
- Jurisdiction: (India) Maharashtra
- Headquarters: Mantralay, Mumbai
- Minister responsible: Nitesh Rane, Cabinet Minister
- Deputy Minister responsible: Vacant, TBD since 29 June 2022, Minister of State
- Ministry executive: (IAS)
- Parent department: Government of Maharashtra

The Ministry of Ports Development is a Ministry of the Government of Maharashtra.

The Ministry is headed by a cabinet level minister. Nitesh Rane is Current Minister of Ports Development, Government of Maharashtra as in October 2025.

== Head office ==
Minister of Ports Development मंत्री बंदर विकास विभाग
- Emblem of India

- Flag of India

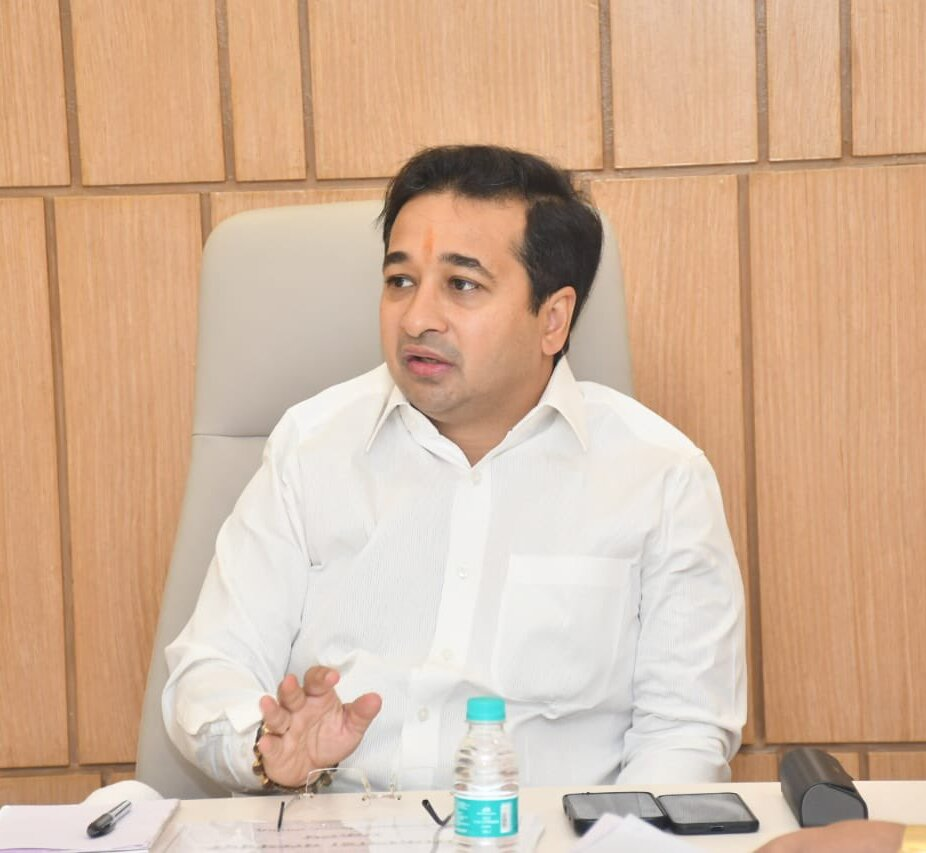
- Incumbent; Nitesh Narayan Rane since 21 December 2024
- Ministry of Ports Development (Maharashtra)
- Style: The Honourable
- Abbreviation: Cabinet Minister
- Member of: State Cabinet
- Reports to: Chief Minister, Maharashtra Legislature
- Seat: Mantralaya, Mumbai
- Appointer: Governor on the advice of the Chief Minister
- Term length: 5 years
- Precursor: Devendra Fadnavis; (2024 - 2024)
- Inaugural holder: Homi J. H. Taleyarkhan; (1960-1962)
- Formation: 1 May 1960
- Deputy: Vacant, TBD since 29 June 2022

== Cabinet Ministers ==
No.	Portrait	Minister (Constituency)	Term of office			Political party	Ministry	Chief Minister
No.	Portrait	Minister (Constituency)	From	To	Period	Political party	Ministry	Chief Minister
Minister of Ports Development
01		Vasantrao Naik (MLA for Pusad Constituency No. 81- Yavatmal District) (Legislative Assembly)	01 May 1960	07 March 1962	1 year, 310 days	Indian National Congress	Yashwantrao I	Yashwantrao Chavan
02		Homi J. H. Taleyarkhan (MLC for Elected by MLAs Constituency No. 22 - Mumbai Suburban District) (Legislative Council)	08 March 1962	19 November 1962	256 days	Indian National Congress	Yashwantrao II	Yashwantrao Chavan
03		M. G. Mane (MLC for Elected by MLAs Constituency No. 02 - Ahmednagar District) (Legislative Council)	20 November 1962	24 November 1963	1 year, 4 days	Indian National Congress	Kannamwar l	Marotrao Kannamwar
04		P. K. Sawant (MLA for Chiplun Constituency No. 265- Ratnagiri District) (Legislative Assembly) (Interim Chief Minister)	25 November 1962	04 December 1963	9 days	Indian National Congress	Sawant	P. K. Sawant
05		D. S. Palaspagar (MLC for Elected by MLAs Constituency No. 19 - Bhandara District) (Legislative Council)	05 December 1963	01 March 1967	3 years, 86 days	Indian National Congress	Vasantrao I	Vasantrao Naik
06		Balasaheb Desai (MLA for Patan Constituency No. 261- Satara District) (Legislative Assembly)	01 March 1967	27 October 1969	2 years, 240 days	Indian National Congress	Vasantrao II	Vasantrao Naik
07		S. K. Wankhede (MLA for Sawargoan Constituency No. 49- Nagpur District) (Legislative Assembly)	27 October 1969	13 March 1972	2 years, 138 days	Indian National Congress	Vasantrao II	Vasantrao Naik
08		Yashwantrao Mohite (MLA for Karad South Constituency No. 260- Satara District) (Legislative Assembly)	13 March 1972	04 April 1973	1 year, 32 days	Indian National Congress	Vasantrao III	Vasantrao Naik
09		Abdul Rahman Antulay (MLA for Shrivardhan Constituency No. 193- Raigad District) (Legislative Assembly)	04 April 1973	17 Match; 1974	347 days	Indian National Congress	Vasantrao III	Vasantrao Naik
10		M. B. Popat (MLA for Dhobitalao Constituency No. 160- Mumbai City District) (Legislative Assembly)	17 Match; 1974	21 February 1975	341 days	Indian National Congress	Vasantrao III	Vasantrao Naik
11		Yashwantrao Mohite (MLA for Karad South Constituency No. 260- Satara District) (Legislative Assembly)	21 February 1975	16 April 1977	2 years, 54 days	Indian National Congress	Shankarrao I	Shankarrao Chavan
12		Hari Govindrao Vartak (MLA for Bassein-Vasai Constituency No. 180- Palghar District (Legislative Assembly)	17 April 1977	07 March 1978	1 year, 324 days	Indian National Congress	Vasantdada I	Vasantdada Patil
13		Sharad Pawar (MLA for Baramati Constituency No. 201- Pune District) (Legislative Assembly)	07 March 1978	18 July 1978	133 days	Indian National Congress	Vasantdada II	Vasantdada Patil
14		Nihal Ahmed Maulavi Mohammed Usman (MLA for Malegaon Central Constituency No. 114- Nashik District) (Legislative Assembly)	18 July 1978	17 February 1980	1 year, 214 days	Janata Party	Pawar I	Sharad Pawar
15		Jawaharlal Darda (MLC for Elected by MLAs Constituency No. 19 - Yavatmal District) (Legislative Council)	09 June 1980	21 January 1982	1 year, 226 days	Indian National Congress	Antulay	Abdul Rahman Antulay
16		S. M. I. Aseer (MLA for Ahmednagar South Constituency No. 223- Ahmednagar District (Legislative Assembly)	21 January 1982	11 October 1982	263 days	Indian National Congress	Bhosale	Babasaheb Bhosale
17		Pratibha Patil (MLA for Jalgaon City Constituency No. 13- Jalgaon District) (Legislative Assembly)	11 October 1982	02 February 1983	114 days	Indian National Congress	Bhosale	Babasaheb Bhosale
18		Surupsingh Hirya Naik (MLA for Navapur Constituency No. 04- Nandurbar District) (Legislative Assembly)	07 February 1983	05 March 1985	2 years, 26 days	Indian National Congress	Vasantdada III	Vasantdada Patil
19		Balachandra Bhai Sawant (MLC for Elected by MLAs Constituency No. 09 - Ratnagiri District) (Legislative Council)	12 March 1985	03 June 1985	83 days	Indian National Congress	Vasantdada IV	Vasantdada Patil
20		Balachandra Bhai Sawant (MLC for Elected by MLAs Constituency No. 09 - Ratnagiri District) (Legislative Council)	03 June 1985	12 March 1986	282 days	Indian National Congress	Nilangekar	Shivajirao Patil Nilangekar
21		Balachandra Bhai Sawant (MLC for Elected by MLAs Constituency No. 09 - Ratnagiri District) (Legislative Council)	12 March 1986	26 June 1988	2 years, 106 days	Indian National Congress	Shankarrao II	Shankarrao Chavan
22		Waman Ramchandra Sherekar (MLA for Bhandup Constituency No. 178- Mumbai Suburban District (Legislative Assembly)	26 June 1988	03 March 1990	1 year, 250 days	Indian National Congress	Pawar II	Sharad Pawar
23		Padamsinh Bajirao Patil (MLA for Osmanabad Constituency No. 242- Osmanabad District (Legislative Assembly)	03 March 1990	25 January 1991	328 days	Indian National Congress	Pawar III	Sharad Pawar
24		Datta Meghe (MLC for Elected by MLAs Constituency No. 15 - Wardha District) (Legislative Council)	25 January 1991	25 June 1991	161 days	Indian National Congress	Pawar III	Sharad Pawar
25		Sudhakarrao Naik (MLA for Pusad Constituency No. 81- Yavatmal District) (Legislative Assembly) (Chief Minister)	25 June 1991	30 December 1991	188 days	Indian National Congress	Sudhakarrao	Sudhakarrao Naik
26		Vijaysinh Mohite-Patil (MLA for Malshiras Constituency No. 254- Solapur District) (Legislative Assembly)	30 December 1991	22 February 1993	1 year, 54 days	Indian National Congress	Sudhakarrao	Sudhakarrao Naik
27		Prabhakar Dharkar (MLC for Elected by MLAs Constituency No. 16 - Pune District) (Legislative Council)	06 March 1993	14 March 1995	2 years, 8 days	Independent Supported party Indian National Congress	Pawar IV	Sharad Pawar
28		Ganesh Naik (MLA for Belapur Constituency No. 151- Thane District) (Legislative Assembly)	14 March 1995	01 February 1999	3 years, 324 days	Shiv Sena	Joshi	Manohar Joshi
29		Diwakar Raote (MLC for Elected by MLAs Constituency No. 20 - Mumbai City District) (Legislative Council)	01 February 1999	11 May 1999	99 days	Shiv Sena	Rane	Narayan Rane
30		Narayan Rane (MLA for Malvan Constituency No. 269- Sindhudurg District) (Legislative Assembly) (Chief Minister)	11 May 1999	17 October 1999	159 days	Shiv Sena	Rane	Narayan Rane
31		Husain Dalwai (MLA for Ratnagiri Khed Constituency No. 266- Ratnagiri District) (Legislative Assembly)	19 October 1999	16 January 2003	3 years, 89 days	Indian National Congress	Deshmukh I	Vilasrao Deshmukh
32		Chhagan Bhujbal (MLC for Elected by MLAs Constituency No. 09 - Mumbai City District) (Legislative Council) (Deputy Chief Minister)	18 January 2003	23 December 2003	346 days	Nationalist Congress Party	Sushilkumar	Sushilkumar Shinde
33		Chhagan Bhujbal (MLC for Elected by MLAs Constituency No. 09 - Mumbai City District) (Legislative Council)	23 December 2003	01 November 2004	314 days	Nationalist Congress Party	Sushilkumar	Sushilkumar Shinde
34		Vilasrao Deshmukh (MLA for Latur City Constituency No. 235- Latur District) (Legislative Assembly) (Chief Minister)	01 November 2004	09 November 2004	8 days	Indian National Congress	Deshmukh II	Vilasrao Deshmukh
35		Patangrao Kadam (MLA for Palus-Kadegaon Constituency No. 285- Sangli District) (Legislative Assembly)	09 November 2004	01 December 2008	4 years, 22 days	Indian National Congress	Deshmukh II	Vilasrao Deshmukh
36		Ravisheth Patil (MLA for Pen Constituency No. 191- Raigad District) (Legislative Assembly)	08 December 2008	06 November 2009	333 days	Indian National Congress	Ashok I	Ashok Chavan
37		Radhakrishna Vikhe Patil (MLA for Shirdi Constituency No. 218- Ahmednagar District) (Legislative Assembly)	07 November 2009	10 November 2010	1 year, 3 days	Indian National Congress	Ashok II	Ashok Chavan
38		Narayan Rane (MLC for Elected by MLAs Constituency No. 03 - Sindhudurg District) (Legislative Council)	11 November 2010	26 September 2014	3 years, 319 days	Indian National Congress	Prithviraj	Prithviraj Chavan
39		Devendra Fadnavis (MLA for Nagpur South West Constituency No. 52- Nagpur District) (Legislative Assembly) (Chief Minister)	31 October 2014	12 November 2019	5 years, 12 days	Bharatiya Janata Party	Fadnavis I	Devendra Fadnavis
40		Devendra Fadnavis (MLA for Nagpur South West Constituency No. 52- Nagpur District) (Legislative Assembly) (Chief Minister) (In Charge)	23 November 2019	28 November 2019	5 days	Bharatiya Janata Party	Fadnavis II	Devendra Fadnavis
41		Subhash Desai (MLC for Elected by MLAs Constituency No. 09 - Mumbai Suburban District) (Legislative Council)	28 November 2019	30 December 2019	32 days	Shiv Sena	Thackeray	Uddhav Thackeray
42		Aslam Shaikh (MLA for Malad West Constituency No. 162- Mumbai Suburban District) (Legislative Assembly)	30 December 2019	29 June 2022	2 years, 181 days	Indian National Congress	Thackeray	Uddhav Thackeray
43		Eknath Shinde (MLA for Kopri-Pachpakhadi Constituency No. 147- Thane District) (Legislative Assembly) (In Charge)	30 June 2022	14 August 2022	45 days	Shiv Sena (2022–present)	Eknath	Eknath Shinde
44		Dadaji Bhuse (MLA for Malegaon Outer Constituency No. 81- Nashik District) (Legislative Assembly)	14 August 2022	14 July 2023	334 days	Shiv Sena (2022–present)	Eknath	Eknath Shinde
45		Sanjay Bansode (MLA for Udgir Constituency No. 237- Latur District) (Legislative Assembly)	14 July 2023	26 November 2024	1 year, 135 days	Nationalist Congress Party	Eknath	Eknath Shinde
46		Devendra Fadnavis (MLA for Nagpur South West Constituency No. 52- Nagpur District) (Legislative Assembly) (Chief_Minister); In Charge	05 December 2024	Incumbent	1 year, 277 days	Bharatiya Janata Party	Fadnavis III	Devendra Fadnavis
47		Nitesh Narayan Rane (MLA for Kankavli-Vaibhavwadi-Devgad Constituency No. 268- Sindhudurg District) (Legislative Assembly)	21 December 2024	Incumbent	1 year, 261 days	Bharatiya Janata Party	Fadnavis III	Devendra Fadnavis

== Ministers of State ==
No.	Portrait	Deputy Minister (Constituency)	Term of office			Political party	Ministry	Minister	Chief Minister
No.	Portrait	Deputy Minister (Constituency)	From	To	Period	Political party	Ministry	Minister	Chief Minister
Deputy Minister of Ports Development
Vacant			23 November 2019	28 November 2019	5 days	NA	Fadnavis II	Devendra Fadnavis	Devendra Fadnavis
01		Abdul Sattar Abdul Nabi (MLA for Sillod Constituency No. 104- Chhatrapati Sambhaji Nagar District Also Previously Known Aurangabad District (Legislative Assembly)	30 December 2019	27 June 2022	2 years, 179 days	Shiv Sena	Thackeray	Aslam Shaikh	Uddhav Thackeray
02		Aditi Tatkare (MLA for Shrivardhan Constituency No. 193- Raigad District) (Legislative Assembly); Additional_Charge	27 June 2022	29 June 2022	2 days	Nationalist Congress Party	Thackeray	Aslam Shaikh	Uddhav Thackeray
Vacant			30 June 2022	26 November 2024'	2 years, 149 days	NA	Eknath	Eknath Shinde (2022 - 2022); Dadaji Bhuse (2022 - 2023); Sanjay Bansode (2023 – 2024)	Eknath Shinde
Vacant			21 December 2024	incumbent	1 year, 261 days	NA	Fadnavis III	Nitesh Rane (2024 – Present)	Devendra Fadnavis
