= Anil Tatkare =

Indian politician (born 1953)

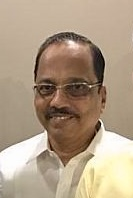
- Tatkare in 2019

Member of the Maharashtra Legislative Council
- In office 26 March 2010 – 31 May 2018
- Preceded by: Bhaskar Jadhav
- Succeeded by: Aniket Tatkare
- Constituency: Raigad–Ratnagiri–Sindhudurg Local Authorities

Personal details
- Born: Anil Dattatray Tatkare; 31 August 1953 (age 73) Mumbai, Maharashtra, India
- Party: Nationalist Congress Party (Sharadchandra Pawar) (2024-present)
- Other political affiliations: Shiv Sena (2019-2024) Nationalist Congress Party (until 2019)
- Spouse: Shubhada Tatkare (m.1977)
- Relations: Tatkare family
- Children: 2 (Avadhut, Sandeep)
- Parent(s): Dattatray Tatkare (father); Geeta Tatkare (mother)

Anil Dattatray Tatkare (born 31 August 1953) is an Indian politician from Maharashtra. He served as a Member of the Maharashtra Legislative Council for the Raigad–Ratnagiri–Sindhudurg Local Authorities for two consecutive terms from 2010 to 2018. On 20 February 2024, he was appointed as the Vice President of the Maharashtra unit of the Nationalist Congress Party (Sharadchandra Pawar).

== Early life and background ==
Tatkare was born on 31 August 1953 in Mumbai, Maharashtra, to Dattatray Tatkare and Geeta Tatkare, and was raised in Kolad, located in the Raigad district. His father, served as the Chairperson of the Panchayat Samiti in the district council for 17 years. He completed his higher secondary education in 1971 from Kolad High School. He is the eldest of five siblings, and the elder brother of Sunil Tatkare, who is the Member of Parliament for Raigad.

== Political career ==
Tatkare began his political journey as a member of the Raigad District Council from 1997 to 2002. When the seat was later reserved for women in 2002, his wife, Shubhada Tatkare, succeeded him and went on to win three consecutive terms, serving from 2002 to 2017. He was associated with the Nationalist Congress Party from its inception in 1999 until 2019.

In 2009, he contested the Maharashtra Legislative Assembly elections from the Pen constituency as an independent candidate. He lost by a small margin to Dhairyashil Patil of the Peasants and Workers Party of India.

In 2010, following the election of sitting MLC Bhaskar Jadhav as an MLA in 2009, a by-election was held for the Raigad–Ratnagiri–Sindhudurg Local Authorities seat. Tatkare contested and won the by-poll, serving his first term from 2010 to 2012. He was re-elected in 2012 and completed a full six-year term until 31 May 2018. He has not contested any elections since completing his MLC tenure in May 2018.

After two decades with the NCP, Tatkare joined the Shiv Sena in 2019 along with his son, Avadhut Tatkare. In February 2024, following the split in the NCP, he joined the Sharad Pawar-led faction and was appointed Vice President of the Maharashtra state unit.

== Personal life ==
Anil Tatkare has been married to Shubhada Tatkare since 1977. His son, Avadhut Tatkare, is a former MLA for Shrivardhan, and another son, Sandeep Tatkare, is also active in Raigad district politics. The Tatkare family has held significant influence in Raigad district politics for decades.
