= Ministry of Sports and Youth Welfare (Maharashtra) =

Maharashtra government ministry responsible for Sports and Youth Welfare

Ministry of Sports and Youth Welfare Government of Maharashtra
- मंत्रालय क्रीडा व युवक कल्याण विभाग, महाराष्ट्र शासन
- Seal of the state of Maharashtra

- Building of Administrative Headquarters of Mumbai

Ministry overview
- Jurisdiction: (India) Maharashtra
- Headquarters: Mantralay, Mumbai
- Minister responsible: Sunetra Ajit Pawar, Deputy Chief Minister and Minister of Sports and Youth Welfare
- Deputy Minister responsible: Vacant, TBD since 29 June 2022, Minister of State
- Ministry executive: (IAS)
- Parent department: Government of Maharashtra

The Ministry of Sports and Youth Welfare is a Ministry of the Government of Maharashtra.

The Ministry is headed by a cabinet level Minister. Sunetra Ajit Pawar is given charge as the Deputy Chief Minister and Minister of Sports and Youth Welfare Government of Maharashtra in 31 January 2026.

The Ministry looks after sports and games and supports in organising and conduct of sporting activities in the state. It also presents annual Shiv Chhatrapati State Sports Awards to the best sportspersons in various disciplines.

== Head office ==
Minister of Sports and Youth Welfare मंत्री क्रीडा व युवक कल्याण विभाग
- Emblem of India

- Flag of India
- Incumbent; Sunetra Ajit Pawar (Deputy Chief Minister) since 31 January 2026
- Ministry of Sports and Youth Welfare (Maharashtra)
- Style: The Honourable
- Abbreviation: Cabinet Minister
- Member of: State Cabinet
- Reports to: Chief Minister, Maharashtra Legislature
- Seat: Mantralaya, Mumbai
- Appointer: Governor on the advice of the Chief Minister
- Term length: 5 years
- Precursor: Devendra Fadnavis (2026 - 2026)
- Inaugural holder: P. K. Sawant (1960-1962)
- Formation: 1 May 1960
- Deputy: Vacant, TBD; since 29 June 2022

== Cabinet Ministers ==
No.	Portrait	Minister (Constituency)	Term of office			Political party	Ministry	Chief Minister
No.	Portrait	Minister (Constituency)	From	To	Period	Political party	Ministry	Chief Minister
Minister of Sports and Youth Welfare
01		Balasaheb Shivram Bharde (MLA for Ahmednagar South Constituency No. 224- Ahmednagar District) (Legislative Assembly)	01 May 1960	07 March 1962	1 year, 310 days	Indian National Congress	Yashwantrao I	Yashwantrao Chavan
02		P. K. Sawant (MLA for Chiplun Constituency No. 265- Ratnagiri District) (Legislative Assembly)	08 March 1962	19 November 1962	256 days	Indian National Congress	Yashwantrao II	Yashwantrao Chavan
03		D. S. Palapsagar (MLC for Elected by MLAs Constituency No. 19 - Bhandara District) (Legislative Council)	20 November 1962	24 November 1963	1 year, 4 days	Indian National Congress	Kannamwar l	Marotrao Kannamwar
04		P. K. Sawant (MLA for Chiplun Constituency No. 265- Ratnagiri District) (Legislative Assembly) (Interim Chief Minister)	25 November 1962	04 December 1963	9 days	Indian National Congress	Sawant	P. K. Sawant
05		S. K. Wankhede (MLA for Sawargoan Constituency No. 49- Nagpur District) (Legislative Assembly)	05 December 1963	01 March 1967	3 years, 86 days	Indian National Congress	Vasantrao I	Vasantrao Naik
06		Vasantrao Naik (MLA for Pusad Constituency No. 81- Yavatmal District) (Legislative Assembly) (Chief Minister)	01 March 1967	27 October 1969	2 years, 240 days	Indian National Congress	Vasantrao II	Vasantrao Naik
07		Homi J. H. Taleyarkhan (MLC for Elected by MLAs Constituency No. 22 - Mumbai Suburban District) (Legislative Council)	27 October 1969	13 March 1972	2 years, 138 days	Indian National Congress	Vasantrao II	Vasantrao Naik
08		Rafique Zakaria (MLC for Elected by MLAs Constituency No. 16 - Mumbai Suburban District) (Legislative Council)	13 March 1972	04 April 1973	1 year, 32 days	Indian National Congress	Vasantrao III	Vasantrao Naik
09		Hari Govindrao Vartak (MLA for Bassein-Vasai Constituency No. 180- Palghar District (Legislative Assembly)	04 April 1973	17 Match; 1974	347 days	Indian National Congress	Vasantrao III	Vasantrao Naik
10		Madhukar Dhanaji Chaudhari (MLA for Raver Constituency No. 11- Jalgaon District) (Legislative Assembly)	17 Match; 1974	21 February 1975	341 days	Indian National Congress	Vasantrao III	Vasantrao Naik
11		Madhukar Dhanaji Chaudhari (MLA for Raver Constituency No. 11- Jalgaon District) (Legislative Assembly)	21 February 1975	16 April 1977	2 years, 54 days	Indian National Congress	Shankarrao I	Shankarrao Chavan
12		S. K. Wankhede (Sports) (MLA for Sawargoan Constituency No. 49- Nagpur District) (Legislative Assembly)	17 April 1977	07 March 1978	1 year, 324 days	Indian National Congress	Vasantdada I	Vasantdada Patil
13		Sharad Pawar (Youth Service) (MLA for Baramati Constituency No. 201- Pune District) (Legislative Assembly)	17 April 1977	07 March 1978	1 year, 324 days	Indian National Congress	Vasantdada I	Vasantdada Patil
14		Jawaharlal Darda (MLC for Elected by MLAs Constituency No. 19 - Yavatmal District) (Legislative Council)	07 March 1978	18 July 1978	133 days	Indian National Congress	Vasantdada II	Vasantdada Patil
15		Narayan Dnyandev Patil (MLA for Kolhapur Constituency No. 273- Kolhapur District (Legislative Assembly)	18 July 1978	17 February 1980	1 year, 214 days	Peasants and Workers Party of India	Pawar I	Sharad Pawar
16		Jayant Shridhar Tilak (MLC for Elected by MLAs Constituency No. 02 - Pune District) (Legislative Council)	09 June 1980	21 January 1982	1 year, 226 days	Indian National Congress	Antulay	Abdul Rahman Antulay
17		Sharadchandrika Suresh Patil (MLA for Chopda Constituency No. 10- Jalgaon District) (Legislative Assembly)	21 January 1982	02 February 1983	1 year, 12 days	Indian National Congress	Bhosale	Babasaheb Bhosale
18		Sudhakarrao Naik (MLA for Pusad Constituency No. 81- Yavatmal District) (Legislative Assembly)	07 February 1983	05 March 1985	2 years, 26 days	Indian National Congress	Vasantdada III	Vasantdada Patil
19		Sushilkumar Shinde (MLA for Solapur City Central Constituency No. 249- Solapur District) (Legislative Assembly)	12 March 1985	03 June 1985	83 days	Indian National Congress	Vasantdada IV	Vasantdada Patil
20		Vijaysinh Mohite-Patil (MLA for Malshiras Constituency No. 254- Solapur District) (Legislative Assembly)	03 June 1985	12 March 1986	282 days	Indian National Congress	Nilangekar	Shivajirao Patil Nilangekar
21		Ram Meghe (MLA for Daryapur Constituency No. 40- Amravati District) (Legislative Assembly)	12 March 1986	26 June 1988	2 years, 106 days	Indian National Congress	Shankarrao II	Shankarrao Chavan
22		Padamsinh Bajirao Patil (MLA for Osmanabad Constituency No. 242- Osmanabad District (Legislative Assembly)	26 June 1988	03 March 1990	1 year, 250 days	Indian National Congress	Pawar II	Sharad Pawar
23		Vilasrao Deshmukh (MLA for Latur City Constituency No. 235- Latur District) (Legislative Assembly)	03 March 1990	25 June 1991	1 year, 114 days	Indian National Congress	Pawar III	Sharad Pawar
24		Sushilkumar Shinde (MLA for Solapur City Central Constituency No. 249- Solapur District) (Legislative Assembly)	25 June 1991	22 February 1993	1 year, 242 days	Indian National Congress	Sudhakarrao	Sudhakarrao Naik
25		Ramdas Athawale (MLC for Elected by MLAs Constituency No. 11 - Sangli District) (Legislative Council)	06 March 1993	14 March 1995	2 years, 8 days	Republican Party of India (Athawale)	Pawar IV	Sharad Pawar
26		Babanrao Gholap (MLA for Deolali Constituency No. 126- Pune District) (Legislative Assembly)	14 March 1995	01 February 1999	3 years, 324 days	Shiv Sena	Joshi	Manohar Joshi
27		Sudhir Mungantiwar (MLA for Ballarpur Constituency No. 72- Chandrapur District) (Legislative Assembly)	01 February 1999	17 October 1999	258 days	Bharatiya Janata Party	Rane	Narayan Rane
28		Ramkrishna More (MLA for Khed Constituency No. 219- Pune District) (Legislative Assembly)	19 October 1999	16 January 2003	3 years, 89 days	Indian National Congress	Deshmukh I	Vilasrao Deshmukh
29		Ramkrishna More (MLA for Khed Constituency No. 219- Pune District) (Legislative Assembly)	18 January 2003	01 November 2004	1 year, 295 days	Indian National Congress	Sushilkumar	Sushilkumar Shinde
30		Vilasrao Deshmukh (MLA for Latur City Constituency No. 235- Latur District) (Legislative Assembly) (Chief Minister)	01 November 2004	09 November 2004	8 days	Indian National Congress	Deshmukh II	Vilasrao Deshmukh
31		Vasant Purke (MLA for Ralegaon Constituency No. 77- Yavatmal District) (Legislative Assembly)	09 November 2004	01 December 2008	4 years, 22 days	Indian National Congress	Deshmukh II	Vilasrao Deshmukh
32		Patangrao Kadam (MLA for Palus-Kadegaon Constituency No. 285- Sangli District) (Legislative Assembly)	08 December 2008	06 November 2009	333 days	Indian National Congress	Ashok I	Ashok Chavan
33		Suresh Shetty (MLA for Andheri East Constituency No. 166- Mumbai Suburban district (Legislative Assembly)	07 November 2009	10 November 2010	1 year, 3 days	Indian National Congress	Ashok II	Ashok Chavan
34		Rajendra Darda (MLA for Aurangabad East Constituency No. 109- Chhatrapati Sambhaji Nagar District Also Previously Known Aurangabad District (Legislative Assembly)	11 November 2010	26 September 2014	3 years, 319 days	Indian National Congress	Prithviraj	Prithviraj Chavan
35		Vinod Tawde (MLA for Borivali Constituency No. 152- Mumbai Suburban District (Legislative Assembly)	31 October 2014	12 June 2019	4 years, 224 days	Bharatiya Janata Party	Fadnavis I	Devendra Fadnavis
36		Ashish Shelar (MLA for Vandre West Constituency No. 177- Mumbai Suburban District) (Legislative Assembly)	12 June 2019	12 November 2019	153 days	Bharatiya Janata Party	Fadnavis I	Devendra Fadnavis
37		Devendra Fadnavis (MLA for Nagpur South West Constituency No. 52- Nagpur District) (Legislative Assembly) (Chief Minister) (In Charge)	23 November 2019	28 November 2019	5 days	Bharatiya Janata Party	Fadnavis II	Devendra Fadnavis
38		Subhash Desai (MLC for Elected by MLAs Constituency No. 09 - Mumbai Suburban District) (Legislative Council)	28 November 2019	30 December 2019	32 days	Shiv Sena	Thackeray	Uddhav Thackeray
39		Sunil Chhatrapal Kedar (MLA for Savner Constituency No. 49- Nagpur District) (Legislative Assembly)	30 December 2019	29 June 2022	2 years, 181 days	Indian National Congress	Thackeray	Uddhav Thackeray
40		Eknath Shinde (MLA for Kopri-Pachpakhadi Constituency No. 147- Thane District) (Legislative Assembly) (In Charge)	30 June 2022	14 August 2022	45 days	Shiv Sena (2022–present)	Eknath	Eknath Shinde
41		Girish Mahajan (MLA for Jamner Constituency No. 19- Jalgaon District) (Legislative Assembly)	14 August 2022	14 July 2023	334 days	Bharatiya Janata Party	Eknath	Eknath Shinde
42		Sanjay Bansode (MLA for Udgir Constituency No. 237- Latur District) (Legislative Assembly)	14 July 2023	26 November 2024	1 year, 135 days	Nationalist Congress Party	Eknath	Eknath Shinde
43		Devendra Fadnavis (MLA for Nagpur South West Constituency No. 52- Nagpur District) (Legislative Assembly) (Chief_Minister); In Charge	05 December 2024	21 December 2024	16 days	Bharatiya Janata Party	Fadnavis III	Devendra Fadnavis
44		Dattatray Vithoba Bharne (MLA for Indapur Constituency No. 200- Pune District (Legislative Assembly)	21 December 2024	31 July 2025	222 days	Nationalist Congress Party (Ajit Pawar Group)	Fadnavis III	Devendra Fadnavis
45		Manikrao Kokate (MLA for Sinnar Constituency No. 120- Nashik District (Legislative Assembly)	31 July 2025	17 December 2025	140 days	Nationalist Congress Party	Fadnavis III	Devendra Fadnavis
46		Ajit Pawar (MLA for Baramati Constituency No. 201- Pune District (Legislative Assembly) (Deputy Chief Minister); Additional Charge	17 December 2025	28 January 2026	42 days	Nationalist Congress Party	Fadnavis III	Devendra Fadnavis
47		Devendra Fadnavis (MLA for Nagpur South West Constituency No. 52- Nagpur District) (Legislative Assembly) (Chief Minister); Additional Charge	28 January 2026	31 January 2026	3 days	Bharatiya Janata Party	Fadnavis III	Devendra Fadnavis
48		Sunetra Ajit Pawar (Not Elected Any Constituency of Maharashtra Legislature- Pune District) (Legislative Assembly / Legislative Council) (Deputy Chief Minister)	31 January 2026	Incumbent	220 days	Nationalist Congress Party (Ajit Pawar Group)	Fadnavis III	Devendra Fadnavis

== Ministers of State ==
No.	Portrait	Deputy Minister (Constituency)	Term of office			Political party	Ministry	Minister	Chief Minister
No.	Portrait	Deputy Minister (Constituency)	From	To	Period	Political party	Ministry	Minister	Chief Minister
Deputy Minister of Sports and Youth Welfare
Vacant			23 November 2019	28 November 2019	5 days	NA	Fadnavis II	Devendra Fadnavis	Devendra Fadnavis
01		Aditi Tatkare (MLA for Shrivardhan Constituency No. 193- Raigad District) (Legislative Assembly)	30 December 2019	29 June 2022	2 years, 181 days	Nationalist Congress Party	Thackeray	Sunil Chhatrapal Kedar	Uddhav Thackeray
Vacant			30 June 2022	26 November 2024	2 years, 149 days	NA	Eknath	Eknath Shinde (2022 - 2022); Girish Mahajan (2022 - 2023); Sanjay Bansode (2023 – 2024)	Eknath Shinde
Vacant			21 December 2024	incumbent	1 year, 261 days	NA	Fadnavis III	Dattatray Vithoba Bharne (2024 – 2025); Manikrao Kokate (2025 – 2025); Ajit Pawar Additional Charge (2025 – 2026); Devendra Fadnavis Additional Charge (2026 – 2026); Sunetra Pawar (2026 – Present)	Devendra Fadnavis
