= Anant Tare =

Indian politician (died 2021)

Member of Maharashtra Legislative Council
- In office 2000–2006
- Preceded by: Vijay Sawant
- Succeeded by: Bhaskar Jadhav
- Constituency: Raigad–Ratnagiri–Sindhudurg Local Authorities

Mayor of Thane
- In office 1993–1996
- Preceded by: Naeem Khan
- Succeeded by: Manohar Gadhwe

Personal details
- Born: 25 October 1954 Thane, Maharashtra, India
- Died: 22 February 2021 (aged 67) Thane, Maharashtra, India
- Party: Shiv Sena
- Children: 2
- Occupation: Politician

Anant Waman Tare (25 October 1954 – 22 February 2021) was an Indian politician from Thane, Maharashtra, affiliated with the Shiv Sena. He served as the Mayor of Thane from 1993 to 1996 and as a Member of the Maharashtra Legislative Council representing the Raigad–Ratnagiri–Sindhudurg Local Authorities constituency from 2000 to 2006.

Tare was portrayed by actor Prasad Khandekar in the 2022 Marathi biographical film Dharmaveer, which is based on the life of Shiv Sena leader Anand Dighe.
