= A. R. Antulay =

Indian politician

1st Union Minister of Minority Affairs
- In office 29 January 2006 – 19 January 2009
- President: A. P. J. Abdul Kalam; Pratibha Patil
- Prime Minister: Manmohan Singh
- Preceded by: Position established
- Succeeded by: Salman Khurshid

26th Union Minister of Health and Family Welfare
- In office 11 June 1995 – 16 May 1996
- President: Shankar Dayal Sharma
- Prime Minister: P. V. Narasimha Rao
- Preceded by: P. V. Narasimha Rao
- Succeeded by: Sartaj Singh

Ministry of Water Resources, River Development & Ganga Rejuvenation
- In office 17 January 1995 – 16 May 1996
- President: Shankar Dayal Sharma
- Prime Minister: P. V. Narasimha Rao
- Preceded by: Vidya Charan Shukla
- Succeeded by: Atal Bihari Vajpayee

8th Chief Minister of Maharashtra
- In office 09 June 1980 – 12 January 1982
- Governor: Sadiq Ali; Om Prakash Mehra
- Ministry and Department: General Administration; Home Affairs; Planning; Information and Public Relations; Information Technology; Water Resources; Water Supply; Sanitation; Command Area Development; Forest Department; Skill Development and Entrepreneurship; Minority Development and Aukaf; Khar Land Development; Earthquake Rehabilitation
- Preceded by: President's rule
- Succeeded by: Babasaheb Bhosale

Leader of the House Maharashtra Legislative Assembly
- In office 09 June 1980 – 12 January 1982
- Governor: Sadiq Ali; Om Prakash Mehra
- Speaker of the House: Pranlal Vora; Sharad Dighe
- Deputy Leader: Jawaharlal Darda
- Preceded by: Sharad Pawar
- Succeeded by: Babasaheb Bhosale

Leader of The House Maharashtra Legislative Council
- In office 21 February 1975 – 16 May 1977
- Chief Minister: Shankarrao Chavan
- Chairman of the House: Vitthal Sakharam Page
- Deputy Leader: Sundarrao Solanke
- Preceded by: Pratibha Patil
- Succeeded by: Vasantdada Patil

Cabinet Minister Government of Maharashtra
- In office 05 December 1963 – 01 March 1967
- Governor: Vijaya Lakshmi Pandit; P V Cherian
- Chief Minister: Vasantrao Naik
- Ministry and Departments: Finance; Public Works (Excluding Public Undertakings); Planning; Co-operation; Higher and Technical Education; Fisheries Department
- In office 01 March 1967 – 13 March 1972
- Governor: P V Cherian; Ali Yavar Jung
- Chief Minister: Vasantrao Naik
- Ministry and Departments: Public Works (Including Public Undertakings); Energy, New and Renewable Energy; Transport; Protocol; Water Supply; Soil and Water Conservation; Parliamentary Affairs; Sanitation; Ex. Servicemen Welfare; Ports Development; Minority Development and Aukaf
- In office 13 March 1972 – 20 February 1975
- Governor: Ali Yavar Jung
- Chief Minister: Vasantrao Naik
- Ministry and Departments: Law and Judiciary; Special Assistance; Social Justice; Environment and Climate Change; Public Health; Housing; Rural Development; Industries; Textiles; School Education; Medical Education; Skill Development and Entrepreneurship; Sports and Youth Welfare; Agriculture; Food and Drug Administration; Horticulture; Khar Land Development; Employment Guarantee; Minority Development and Aukaf
- In office 21 February 1975 – 16 April 1977
- Governor: Ali Yavar Jung
- Chief Minister: Shankarrao Chavan
- Ministry and Departments: Law and Judiciary; Public Works (Including Public Undertakings); Water Resources; Marketing; Mining Department; Ex. Servicemen Welfare; Khar Land Development

Member of Parliament, Lok Sabha
- In office 29 November 1989 – 5 March 1998
- Preceded by: Dinkar Patil
- Succeeded by: Ramsheth Thakur
- Constituency: Kolaba
- In office 13 May 2004 – 16 May 2009
- Preceded by: Ramsheth Thakur
- Succeeded by: constituency switched to Raigad Lok Sabha constituency
- Constituency: Kolaba

Member of Maharashtra Legislative Assembly
- In office 1962–1972
- Preceded by: New Constituency
- Succeeded by: A. Shakur A. Karim Ukaye
- Constituency: Shrivardhan
- In office 1980–1990
- Preceded by: Ravindra Raut
- Succeeded by: Ravindra Raut
- Constituency: Shrivardhan

Personal details
- Born: 9 February 1929 Raigad, Bombay Presidency, British India
- Died: 2 December 2014 (aged 85) Mumbai, Maharashtra, India
- Party: Indian National Congress
- Education: Bombay University (BA)

Abdul Rahman Antulay (Note: Marathi: अब्दुर्रह्मान अन्तुले) (9 February 1929 – 2 December 2014) was an Indian politician. Antulay was a union minister for Minority Affairs and a Member of Parliament in the 14th Lok Sabha of India. Earlier he had been the Chief Minister of the state of Maharashtra, but was forced to resign after being convicted by the Bombay High Court on charges that he had extorted money for a trust fund he managed. Later, the Supreme Court of India cleared him of the allegations in that case.

Antulay belonged to the Indian National Congress. In the 2009 Indian general elections, he lost to Anant Geete from the Raigad Lok Sabha constituency of Maharashtra. He is the first Muslim chief minister of Maharashtra.

== Life ==
He was born in a Konkani Muslim Family near. to father Hafiz Abdul Gafoor and mother Zohrabi in Ambet village, near Mahad Raigad, Maharashtra, India. He was married to Nargis Antulay and the couple had one son and three daughters. After appearing for his B.A. examinations, he studied to be a barrister, educated at Bombay University and Lincoln's Inn, London.

Antulay was a member of the Maharashtra Legislative Assembly from 1962 to 1976, during which time he served in the Maharashtra state government as Minister of State for Law and Judiciary, Ports and Fisheries and then as Minister of Law & Judiciary, Building, Communication and Housing from October 1969 to February 1976. He was a member of the Rajya Sabha from 1976 to 1980; in 1980, he was again elected to the Maharashtra Legislative Assembly and served as Chief Minister of Maharashtra from June 1980 to January 1982. He was forced to resign his post after allegations of corruption and a conviction in an extortion case. He again got elected in 1985 election to the Maharashtra Legislative Assembly and remained until 1989, when he was elected to the 9th Lok Sabha. He was re-elected to the 10th Lok Sabha in 1991. From June 1995 to May 1996, he was Union Minister of Health and Family Welfare, and from February to May 1996 he was additionally in charge of Water Resources. In 1996 he was re-elected to the 11th Lok Sabha, and in 2004 he was elected to the 14th Lok Sabha. He was Union Minister for Ministry of Minority Affairs (India) under Manmohan Singh's government.

He started his career as active social worker in 1945. As a social worker his notable achievements include construction of (i) a jetty on the bank of Savitri River, Bankot (Khadi) Creek through local people offering free labor (shramdan in Marathi) to complete the task. He also worked with his own hands along with the villagers of Ambet; (ii) road between the village Ambet and Lonere Goregaon (then in Kolaba, now in Raigad district) to connect his village to NH-17. He had a keen interest in the uplifting of the weaker sections of the society and as the Chief Minister of Maharashtra had launched Sanjay Gandhi Niradhar Yojana (a monthly financial aid scheme for poor and destitute), pension and housing facilities for legislators and media persons, and many more initiatives. He had also announced that he would get back the Bhawani sword — the sword used by iconic Maratha king Shivaji which now lies in the British Museum in London.

He had to resign from the post of Chief Minister of Maharashtra due to allegations of his involvement in corruption. However, the Supreme Court cleared him of all allegations years later. The charges were seen as political ploy to malign him and arrest his political growth. When cleared by the Supreme Court, he said "I had done nothing wrong. I was targeted by political rivals but they failed. I suffered some setbacks, but they could not destroy me."

Antulay died from chronic Kidney failure on 2 December 2014 while being treated at the Breach Candy Hospital in Mumbai.

Upon Antulay's demise, noted criminal lawyer J.P. Mishra, who represented the Bharatiya Janata Party leader Ramdas Nayak in the corruption cases he had filed against Antulay, paid tributes to his former adversary. He acknowledged Antulay as "an administrator par excellence" and praised him as "a truly great human being. He set up the trusts for the benefit of the poorest people in society, but they became his undoing. Even during the trial, he was always amiable and soft-spoken, never harbouring animosity or ill-will against anybody".

== Literary works ==
He published several books:

- Parliamentary Privilege (compilation of his five articles published in the Times of India);
- Mahajan Report - Uncovered;
- Appointment of a Chief Justice;
- Democracy- Parliamentary or Presidential? (compilation of his speeches and interviews).

== Controversies ==
He resigned as Chief Minister of Maharashtra after the Bombay High Court convicted him of extortion on 13 January 1982. The court ruled that Antulay had illegally required Bombay area builders to make donations to Indira Gandhi Pratibha Pratishthan trust, one of several trust funds he had established and controlled, in exchange for receiving more cement than the quota allotted to them by the Government. He was later granted bail by the court. However, the Supreme Court later cleared him of the allegations.

Again after 2008 Mumbai attacks he has raised a controversy by saying that the end of Hemant Karkare, of the Anti-Terrorism Squad of Maharashtra, killed in the attacks, may be related to his investigation of the 2006 Malegaon blasts, leading to questions about the Mumbai attacks. Later he changed his stand and told Parliament he had not talked about who killed the police officers but about who "sent them in the wrong direction". His party, Congress, distanced itself from his statements. The then US ambassador, in some of the US embassy cables, accused that this early dismissal, then followed by tacit promotion, indicates that "the Congress Party will readily stoop to the old caste/religious-based politics if it feels it is in its interest."

== Notes ==
Preceded by Sharad Pawar	Chief Minister of Maharashtra; 9 June 1980 – 12 January 1982	Succeeded by Babasaheb Bhosale
