= Roha Ashtami =

- city
- Location in Maharashtra, India
- Coordinates: 18.4333°N 73.1167°E
- Country: RohaIndia
- State: Maharashtra
- District: Raigad

Government
  - Body: Municipal council

Population (2001)
  - Total: 19,082

Languages
  - Official: Marathi
- Time zone: UTC+5:30 (IST)

Roha Ashtami is a twin city and a municipal council in the Raigad district in the Indian state of Maharashtra.

== Demographics ==
At the 2001 India census, Roha Ashtami had a population of 19,082. Males constitute 52% of the population and females 48%. Roha Ashtami has an average literacy rate of 81%, higher than the national average of 59.5%: male literacy is 83%, and female literacy is 78%. In Roha Ashtami, 12% of the population is under 6 years of age.
