= Nationalist Congress Party (Ajit Pawar faction) =

Political party in India

Nationalist Congress Party (Ajit Pawar)
- Abbreviation: NCP (AP)
- Leader: Sunetra Pawar (After Ajit Pawar)
- President: None
- Chairperson: None
- Spokesperson: Amol Mitkari
- Parliamentary Chairperson: Praful Patel
- Rajya Sabha Leader: Praful Patel
- Lok Sabha Leader: Sunil Tatkare
- Founded: 1 July 2023 (2 years ago)
- Dissolved: 6 February 2024 (2 years ago)
- Split from: Nationalist Congress Party
- Preceded by: Nationalist Congress Party
- Merged into: Nationalist Congress Party
- Headquarters: Opposite Mumbai Mantralaya
- Ideology: centrism secularism social equality or egalitarianism Indian Nationalism
- Political position: Centrism
- Colours: Pink
- ECI Status: Unregistered
- Alliance: National Democratic Alliance (National Level), (Jharkhand); North-East Democratic Alliance (Nagaland); MahaYuti (Maharashtra)
- Seats in Rajya Sabha: 1 / 245
- Seats in Lok Sabha: 1 / 543
- Seats in State Legislative Assemblies: Indian states 41 / 288 (Maharashtra) 7 / 60 (Nagaland)
- Seats in Maharashtra Legislative Council: 6 / 78
- Number of states and union territories in government: 2 / 31

Election symbol
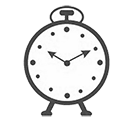

Party flag

The Ajit Pawar faction of the Nationalist Congress Party was a faction of the erstwhile united Nationalist Congress Party that was led primarily by Ajit Pawar. The faction had come into existence due to several disagreements with the then party president and Ajit's uncle Sharad Pawar. The faction got hold of the party name afterwards.

== History ==
In July 2023, a majority of the elected representatives of the party led by Ajit Pawar joined the National Democratic Alliance government. This caused a direct split between Ajit Pawar and the founder-president of the party Sharad Pawar. On 7 February 2024, the Election Commission of India awarded the party name and symbol to the group headed by Ajit Pawar. The group led by Sharad Pawar will be known as Nationalist Congress Party (Sharadchandra Pawar).
