= Ajit Pawar =

Indian politician (1959–2026)

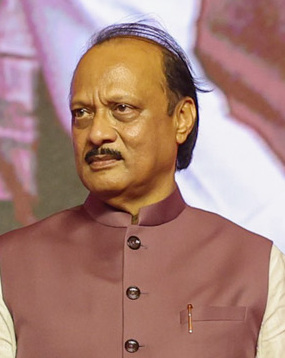
- Pawar in 2024

8th Deputy Chief Minister of Maharashtra
- In office 5 December 2024 – 28 January 2026 Serving with Eknath Shinde
- Governor: C. P. Radhakrishnan; Acharya Devvrat (additional charge)
- Chief Minister: Devendra Fadnavis
- Ministry and Departments: Finance; Planning; State Excise; Sports and Youth Welfare (additional charge); Minority Development and Aukaf (additional charge)
- Preceded by: Devendra Fadnavis
- Succeeded by: Sunetra Pawar
Other positions
8th Deputy Chief Minister of Maharashtra
In office 2 July 2023 – 26 November 2024 Serving with Devendra Fadnavis
Governor	Ramesh Bais; C. P. Radhakrishnan
Chief Minister	Eknath Shinde
Ministry and Departments	Finance; Planning
Preceded by	Devendra Fadnavis
Succeeded by	Himself
In office 30 December 2019 – 29 June 2022
Governor	Bhagat Singh Koshyari
Chief Minister	Uddhav Thackeray
Ministry and Departments	Finance; Planning; State Excise (additional charge)
Preceded by	Himself
Succeeded by	Devendra Fadnavis
In office 23 November 2019 – 26 November 2019
Governor	Bhagat Singh Koshyari
Chief Minister	Devendra Fadnavis
Ministry and Departments	Minister without Portfolio
Preceded by	President's rule
Succeeded by	Himself
In office 7 December 2012 – 26 September 2014
Governor	Om Prakash Kohli (additional charge); C. Vidyasagar Rao
Chief Minister	Prithviraj Chavan
Ministry and Departments	Finance; Planning; Energy
Preceded by	Himself
Succeeded by	President's rule
In office 10 November 2010 – 25 September 2012
Governor	K. Sankaranarayanan
Chief Minister	Prithviraj Chavan
Ministry and Departments	Finance; Planning; Energy
Preceded by	Chhagan Bhujbal
Succeeded by	Himself
23rd Leader of the Opposition in Maharashtra Legislative Assembly
In office 4 July 2022 – 2 July 2023
Governor	Bhagat Singh Koshyari; Ramesh Bais
Deputy	Balasaheb Thorat
Chief Minister	Eknath Shinde
Speaker	Zirwal Narhari Sitaram (acting); Rahul Narwekar
Preceded by	Devendra Fadnavis
Succeeded by	Jitendra Awhad (acting) Balasaheb Thorat (additional charge); Vijay Namdevrao Wadettiwar
Leader of the House in Maharashtra Legislative Council
In office 24 February 2020 – 29 June 2022
Governor	Bhagat Singh Koshyari
Deputy	Subhash Desai
Chairman	Ramraje Naik Nimbalkar
Preceded by	Chandrakant Patil; Subhash Desai (acting)
Succeeded by	Devendra Fadnavis
In office 11 November 2010 – 25 September 2012
Governor	K. Sankaranarayanan
Chairman	Shivajirao Deshmukh
Preceded by	Chhagan Bhujbal
Succeeded by	R. R. Patil
Cabinet Minister in Maharashtra
In office 7 November 2009 – 10 November 2010
Governor	S. C. Jamir; K. Sankaranarayanan
Ministry and Departments	Water Resources; Krishna Valley Irrigation Corporation; Energy
Chief Minister	Ashok Chavan
Preceded by	Sunil Tatkare; Ramraje Naik Nimbalkar
Succeeded by	Ramraje Naik Nimbalkar; Sunil Tatkare
In office 8 December 2008 – 6 November 2009
Governor	S. C. Jamir
Ministry and Departments	Water Resources; Water Supply; Sanitation Command Area Development
Chief Minister	Ashok Chavan
In office 9 November 2004 – 1 December 2008
Governor	Mohammed Fazal; S. M. Krishna; S. C. Jamir
Ministry and Departments	Water Resources; Excluding Krishna Valley Corporation
Chief Minister	Vilasrao Deshmukh
In office 18 January 2003 – 1 November 2004
Governor	Mohammed Fazal
Ministry and Departments	Horticulture; Rural Development; Panchayat Raj
Chief Minister	Sushilkumar Shinde
In office 19 October 1999 – 16 January 2003
Governor	Mohammed Fazal
Ministry and Departments	Horticulture; Irrigation (Krishna Valley Development); Irrigation (Konkan Valley Development)
Chief Minister	Vilasrao Deshmukh
Succeeded by

Member of Maharashtra Legislative Assembly
- In office 18 November 1991 – 28 January 2026
- Preceded by: Sharad Pawar
- Succeeded by: Sunetra Pawar
- Constituency: Baramati

Member of Parliament, Lok Sabha
- In office 20 June 1991 – 18 September 1991
- Preceded by: Shankarrao Bajirao Patil
- Succeeded by: Sharad Pawar
- Constituency: Baramati, Maharashtra

National President of Nationalist Congress Party
- In office 2 July 2023 – 28 January 2026
- Preceded by: Sharad Pawar
- Succeeded by: Sunetra Pawar

Personal details
- Born: Ajit Anantrao Pawar; 22 July 1959 Deolali Pravara, Bombay State, India
- Died: 28 January 2026 (aged 66) Baramati, Maharashtra, India
- Cause of death: Aircraft accident
- Party: Nationalist Congress Party (1999–2026)
- Other political affiliations: Indian National Congress (1982–1999)
- Spouse: Sunetra Patil (m. 1985)
- Relations: Sharad Pawar (uncle); Pratap Govindrao Pawar (uncle); Supriya Sule (cousin sister); Rohit Rajendra Pawar (nephew)
- Children: Parth Pawar (son); Jay Pawar (son)
- Occupation: Politician
- Website: www.ajitpawar.org
- Nickname: Dada

Ajit Anantrao Pawar (Note: Marathi pronunciation: [əd͡ʒit̪ pəʋaːɾ]) (22 July 1959 – 28 January 2026) was an Indian politician who served as Maharashtra's longest-serving deputy chief minister for more than eight years, between 2010 and his death in 2026, for six terms. He held the office under various governments, including the cabinets of Prithviraj Chavan, Devendra Fadnavis, Uddhav Thackeray, and Eknath Shinde.

He also served as the leader of the opposition in the Maharashtra Legislative Assembly from 2022 to 2023 and represented Baramati Lok Sabha constituency in 1991.

== Early life ==
Ajit Anantrao Pawar was born on 22 July 1959 in Deolali Pravara, Maharashtra, to Anantrao and Ashatai Pawar. In 1985, he married Sunetra Pawar (née Patil), the sister of Padamsinh Bajirao Patil, a senior NCP leader. The couple had two sons, Parth and Jay Pawar.

Pawar's grandparents were Govindrao Pawar and Shardabai Pawar. Shardabai was active in the Peasants and Workers Party (PWP). In 1938, she was elected unopposed to the Pune Local Board.

The couple had eleven children, including seven sons and four daughters. One of their sons, Sharad Pawar, later became the president of the Nationalist Congress Party (NCP) and served as the four-time Chief Minister of Maharashtra.

Following the footsteps of his uncle Sharad Pawar in the Indian National Congress, Ajit Pawar made his first foray into politics in 1982 when he was elected to the board of a cooperative sugar factory. In 1991, he was elected as the chairman of the Pune District Central Cooperative Bank and remained in the post for the next 16 years.

== Political career ==
Pawar was elected to the Lok Sabha for the first time in 1991 from the Baramati Parliamentary constituency. He later vacated the seat for his uncle, who then became the Defence Minister in Prime Minister P. V. Narasimha Rao's government. Pawar was known for his blunt and pragmatic leadership style, nicknamed "Ajit Dada".

Later, he was elected to the Maharashtra Legislative Assembly seven times from the Baramati Assembly constituency. He first won in a 1991 by-election and subsequently retained it for five consecutive terms in 1995, 1999, 2004, 2009, and 2014. He served as the Minister of State for Agriculture and Power in CM Sudhakarrao Naik's government from 1991 to 1992.

He became the Minister of State for Soil Conservation, Power and Planning in 1992 when Sharad Pawar became the Chief Minister. In 1999, as part of the INC-NCP coalition government, he became a Cabinet Minister responsible for the Irrigation Department. He was additionally given the Rural Development Department in 2003 as part of Sushilkumar Shinde's cabinet. After the INC-NCP coalition won in the 2004 Assembly elections, he retained the Water Resources Ministry in Deshmukh's and later Ashok Chavan's cabinets.

Ajit Pawar had extensive experience in elected office. In particular, as Deputy Chief Minister, he exerted strong influence over the administration of the state. As Finance Minister, he handled the state budget. He also accelerated the implementation of many major projects while working in the Irrigation and Water Resources Department.

== Leader of Nationalist Congress Party ==
=== Rebellion against Sharad Pawar ===
On 23 November 2019, he defected from NCP and joined a government led by the Bharatiya Janata Party and became the Deputy Chief Minister. He submitted a paper with the signatures of NCP MLAs to the Governor to prove the government's majority. However, the government collapsed less than 80 hours later and he resigned alongside then-CM Devendra Fadnavis. He subsequently returned to the NCP, and on 1 December 2019, it was announced that he would take over as Deputy CM for the Maha Vikas Aghadi government after the start of the winter session of the state legislature on 16 December.

In 2022, due to a split in the Shiv Sena, the Maha Vikas Aghadi government collapsed. After the rebel Shiv Sena faction and the BJP formed a government with Eknath Shinde as CM, Pawar became the Leader of the Opposition in the Maharashtra Legislative Assembly.

=== 2023 party split ===
In 2023, having the support of the majority of the erstwhile NCP's MLAs, he also claimed the position of president of the NCP, as well as the party's name and its electoral symbol. Pawar joined the ruling Maha Yuti coalition and took the oath as deputy CM of the state on 2 July. On 7 February 2024, the Election Commission Of India (ECI) awarded the party name and symbol to the faction headed by Ajit. The faction led by Sharad Pawar took an alternative name: Nationalist Congress Party (Sharadchandra Pawar). Despite his faction being routed in the 2024 Lok Sabha election, his NCP placed in third in the 2024 Legislative Assembly election, with the Maha Yuti alliance forming a majority government after a landslide victory; Pawar was again sworn-in as deputy chief minister in December, controlling portfolios such as finance. The party also performed well in the 2025–26 Maharashtra local elections. Months before his death, reconciliation talks between the two NCP parties were reportedly occurring. His wife, Rajya Sabha MP Sunetra Pawar, succeeded him as the deputy chief minister.

== Death ==
On 28 January 2026, at approximately 08:44 IST (UTC+5:30), a business jet carrying Pawar on an air charter flight from Chhatrapati Shivaji Maharaj International Airport in Mumbai to Baramati Airport in Maharashtra crashed while attempting a second approach to Baramati Airport Runway 11. The aircraft veered off the runway, burst into flames, and was destroyed on impact, resulting in the deaths of Pawar and four others on board.

The aircraft was a 16-year-old Learjet 45XR, registration VT-SSK, operated by VSR Aviation.

At the time of the incident, Pawar was travelling to Baramati to address multiple public meetings in connection with the upcoming Zilla Parishad elections. The Maharashtra government declared a three-day state of mourning following his death; his funeral was held in Baramati on 29 January, with full state honours. His body was cremated.

== Electoral history ==
Election candidature history
Election	Year	Party	Constituency	Opponent		Result	Margin
Lok Sabha	1991	INC	Baramati	BJP	Kanta Nalawade	Won	336,831
Maharashtra Legislative Assembly	1991^	INC	Baramati	BJP	K.H.Khanderao	Won	86,915
Maharashtra Legislative Assembly	1995	INC	Baramati	IND	Kakade Ratanrao Bhagwanrao	Won	77,335
Maharashtra Legislative Assembly	1999	NCP	Baramati	IND	Taware Chandrarao Krishnarao	Won	50,366
Maharashtra Legislative Assembly	2004	NCP	Baramati	SS	Popatrao Mansingrao Tupe	Won	66,157
Maharashtra Legislative Assembly	2009	NCP	Baramati	IND	Taware Ranjankumar Shankarrao	Won	102,797
Maharashtra Legislative Assembly	2014	NCP	Baramati	BJP	Prabhakar Dadaram Gawade	Won	89,792
Maharashtra Legislative Assembly	2019	NCP	Baramati	BJP	Gopichand Padalkar	Won	165,265
Maharashtra Legislative Assembly	2024	NCP	Baramati	NCP-SP	Yugendra Pawar	Won	100,899
