= Raigad–Ratnagiri–Sindhudurg Local Authorities constituency =

Constituency in Maharashtra, India

Raigad–Ratnagiri–Sindhudurg Local Authorities constituency is one of the 78 seats of the Maharashtra Legislative Council and one of the 22 Local Authorities constituencies in the state. It represents elected members of local bodies across the districts of Raigad, Ratnagiri, and Sindhudurg.

== Members of Legislative Council ==
Member	Term		Party
Vijay Sawant	01-Jun-1988	31-May-1994	Peasants and Workers Party
Vijay Sawant	01-Jun-1994	31-May-2000	Indian National Congress
Anant Tare	01-Jun-2000	31-May-2006	Shiv Sena
Bhaskar Jadhav	01-Jun-2006	28-Oct-2009	Nationalist Congress Party
Anil Tatkare	26-Mar-2010^{†}	31-May-2012	Nationalist Congress Party
Anil Tatkare	01-Jun-2012	31-May-2018	Nationalist Congress Party
Aniket Tatkare	01-Jun-2018	31-May-2024	Nationalist Congress Party
Vacant	01-Jun-2024	21-Jun-2026	–
Aniket Tatkare	22-Jun-2026	Incumbent	Nationalist Congress Party

† – By-poll held after Bhaskar Jadhav was elected as MLA for Guhagar constituency.
