= Shrivardhan Assembly constituency =

Constituency of the Maharashtra legislative assembly in India

Coordinates: 18.0515791°N 72.9974982°E

Shrivardhan
- Constituency No. 193 for the Maharashtra Legislative Assembly

Constituency details
- Country: India
- Region: Western India
- State: Maharashtra
- District: Raigad
- Lok Sabha constituency: Raigad
- Established: 1962
- Total electors: 265,354
- Reservation: None

Member of Legislative Assembly
- 15th Maharashtra Legislative Assembly
- Incumbent Aditi Sunil Tatkare
- Party: NCP
- Alliance: NDA
- Elected year: 2024

Shrivardhan Assembly constituency is one of the 288 Vidhan Sabha (Assembly) constituencies of Maharashtra state in Western India.

== Members of Assembly ==
Year	Member	Party
1962	A. R. Antulay	Indian National Congress
1967	A. R. Antulay	Indian National Congress
1972	A. R. Antulay	Indian National Congress
1978	A. Shakur A. Karim Ukaye	Janata Party
1980	Ravindra Raut	Indian National Congress (I)
1980^	A. R. Antulay	Indian National Congress (I)
1985	A. R. Antulay	Independent
1990	Ravindra Raut	Indian National Congress
1995	Shyam Sawant	Shiv Sena
1999	Shyam Sawant	Shiv Sena
2004	Shyam Sawant	Shiv Sena
2005^	Tukaram Surve	Shiv Sena
2009	Sunil Tatkare	Nationalist Congress Party
2014	Avadhut Tatkare	Nationalist Congress Party
2019	Aditi Tatkare	Nationalist Congress Party
2024	Aditi Tatkare	Nationalist Congress Party

== Election results ==
=== Assembly Election 2024 ===
2024 Maharashtra Legislative Assembly election : Shrivardhan
Party	Candidate	Votes	%	±%
NCP	Aditi Tatkare	116,050	72.28%	New
NCP-SP	Anil Dattaram Navgane	33,252	20.71%	New
Independent	Rajabhau Thakur	4,080	2.54%	New
NOTA	None of the Above	3,375	2.10%	▼0.36
MNS	Faizal Abdul Ajij Popere	2,125	1.32%	▲0.36
Independent	Mohammed Qasim Burhanuddin Solkar	1,589	0.99%	New
Independent	Santosh Tanaji Pawar	1,341	0.84%	New
Margin of victory		82,798	51.57%	▲25.75
Turnout		163,939	61.78%	▲0.93
Total valid votes		160,564		
Registered electors		265,354		
NCP hold		Swing	▲12.28	

=== Assembly Election 2019 ===
2019 Maharashtra Legislative Assembly election : Shrivardhan
Party	Candidate	Votes	%	±%
NCP	Aditi Tatkare	92,074	59.99%	▲19.56
SS	Vinod Ramchandra Ghosalkar	52,453	34.18%	▼6.21
NOTA	None of the Above	3,772	2.46%	▲0.10
Independent	Pawar Dnyandeo Maruti	1,844	1.20%	New
MNS	Sanjay Balkrishna Gaikwad	1,473	0.96%	New
Independent	Santosh Tanaji Pawar	1,183	0.77%	New
Independent	Dr. A. Moiz A. Aziz Shaikh	1,057	0.69%	New
Margin of victory		39,621	25.82%	▲25.76
Turnout		157,352		▼3.04
Total valid votes		153,476		
Registered electors		257,600		
NCP hold		Swing	▲19.56	

=== Assembly Election 2014 ===
2014 Maharashtra Legislative Assembly election : Shrivardhan
Party	Candidate	Votes	%	±%
NCP	Avadhut Tatkare	61,038	40.43%	▼7.27
SS	Ravindra Ramji Munde	60,961	40.38%	▲0.52
BJP	Krushna Pandurang Kobnak	11,295	7.48%	New
PWPI	Aslam Ibrahim Raut	5,585	3.70%	New
INC	Uday Bhivaji Kathe	3,960	2.62%	New
NOTA	None of the Above	3,562	2.36%	New
BMP	Maulana Danish Naeem Lambe	1,953	1.29%	New
Independent	Santosh Tanaji Pawar	1,014	0.67%	New
Margin of victory		77	0.05%	▼7.79
Turnout		150,955		▼1.98
Total valid votes		150,955		
Registered electors		241,067		
NCP hold		Swing	▼7.27	

=== Assembly Election 2009 ===
2009 Maharashtra Legislative Assembly election : Shrivardhan
Party	Candidate	Votes	%	±%
NCP	Sunil Tatkare	66,141	47.71%	New
SS	Tukaram Surve	55,270	39.86%	▼12.54
Independent	Gulam Peshaimam	7,210	5.20%	New
Independent	Faisal Popere	3,882	2.80%	New
BSP	Ubhare Farid Faruk	2,273	1.64%	New
RPI(A)	Kawade Shripal Balaji	1,497	1.08%	New
Independent	Abhijeet Dipak Sable	1,433	1.03%	New
Margin of victory		10,871	7.84%	▼5.48
Turnout		138,647	64.60%	▼3.21
Total valid votes		138,643		
Registered electors		214,625		▲23.01
NCP gain from SS		Swing	▼4.69	

=== Assembly By-election 2006 ===
2006 Maharashtra Legislative Assembly by-election : Shrivardhan
Party	Candidate	Votes	%	±%
SS	Sawant Shyam Tukaram	61,995	52.40%	▲9.48
INC	Shaymbhai Sawant	46,240	39.08%	▲1.94
Independent	Ali Kuachali	10,075	8.52%	New
Margin of victory		15,755	13.32%	▲7.55
Turnout		118,323	67.82%	▼2.77
Total valid votes		118,310		
Registered electors		174,479		▼0.28
SS hold		Swing	▲9.48	

=== Assembly Election 2004 ===
2004 Maharashtra Legislative Assembly election : Shrivardhan
Party	Candidate	Votes	%	±%
SS	Sawant Shyam Tukaram	52,998	42.92%	▲6.98
INC	Antulay Mushtaq Ataullah	45,873	37.15%	▲10.92
PWPI	Gidi Krishna Baloji	18,856	15.27%	▼5.12
Independent	Sawant Shyam Tukaram	2,929	2.37%	New
BSP	Joshi Bhimrao Kashinath	1,581	1.28%	New
Independent	Khatib Irshad Hussain	1,253	1.01%	New
Margin of victory		7,125	5.77%	▼3.94
Turnout		123,496	70.58%	▲10.56
Total valid votes		123,490		
Registered electors		174,969		▲8.78
SS hold		Swing	▲6.98	

=== Assembly Election 1999 ===
1999 Maharashtra Legislative Assembly election : Shrivardhan
Party	Candidate	Votes	%	±%
SS	Sawant Shyam Tukaram	34,695	35.94%	▼6.42
INC	Tawsalkar Santosh Manohar	25,324	26.23%	▼0.63
PWPI	Kauchali Ali Abdulla	19,687	20.39%	▲2.87
NCP	Peshimam Gulam Mohamad Mushir	16,834	17.44%	New
Margin of victory		9,371	9.71%	▼5.79
Turnout		104,429	64.93%	▼15.61
Total valid votes		96,540		
Registered electors		160,842		▲6.59
SS hold		Swing	▼6.42	

=== Assembly Election 1995 ===
1995 Maharashtra Legislative Assembly election : Shrivardhan
Party	Candidate	Votes	%	±%
SS	Sawant Shyam Tukaram	48,349	42.36%	▲3.67
INC	Raut Ravindra Narayan	30,658	26.86%	▼18.65
PWPI	Undre Rehana A. Rahim	20,000	17.52%	New
Independent	Dhopat Suresh Bhiku	5,216	4.57%	New
BBM	Mendadkar Ramchandra Kanu	4,706	4.12%	New
Independent	Dandekar Sudhakar Madhukar	2,135	1.87%	New
Independent	Raut Ravindra Shantaram	1,048	0.92%	New
Margin of victory		17,691	15.50%	▲8.68
Turnout		118,271	78.38%	▲15.45
Total valid votes		114,136		
Registered electors		150,902		▲0.75
SS gain from INC		Swing	▼3.15	

=== Assembly Election 1990 ===
1990 Maharashtra Legislative Assembly election : Shrivardhan
Party	Candidate	Votes	%	±%
INC	Raut Ravindra Narayan	41,032	45.52%	▲29.97
SS	Pandurang Bandhuji Sawant	34,882	38.69%	New
JD	Jalgaonkar Ali Akbar A. Rahiman	12,819	14.22%	New
Independent	Dhadve Pandurang Gopal	837	0.93%	New
Margin of victory		6,150	6.82%	▼36.34
Turnout		92,255	61.60%	▲1.31
Total valid votes		90,150		
Registered electors		149,774		▲20.90
INC gain from Independent		Swing	▼18.19	

=== Assembly Election 1985 ===
1985 Maharashtra Legislative Assembly election : Shrivardhan
Party	Candidate	Votes	%	±%
Independent	A. R. Antulay	46,465	63.70%	New
JP	Katkar Ganpat Sakharam	14,984	20.54%	New
INC	Bhai Dandekar	11,341	15.55%	New
Margin of victory		31,481	43.16%	
Turnout		75,435	60.89%	
Total valid votes		72,943		
Registered electors		123,887		
Independent gain from INC(I)		Swing		

=== Assembly By-election 1980 ===
1980 Maharashtra Legislative Assembly by-election : Shrivardhan
Party	Candidate	Votes	%	±%
INC(I)	A. R. Antulay	72,897		
JP	D. Ranvilkar	8,054		
Margin of victory		64,843		
Turnout				
Total valid votes		0		
INC(I) hold		Swing		

=== Assembly Election 1980 ===
1980 Maharashtra Legislative Assembly election : Shrivardhan
Party	Candidate	Votes	%	±%
INC(I)	Raut Ravindra Narayan	36,157	62.35%	▲20.59
JP	Dandekar Madhukar Laxman	20,829	35.92%	▼12.74
Margin of victory		15,328	26.43%	▲19.53
Turnout		60,189	54.12%	▼7.39
Total valid votes		57,994		
Registered electors		111,205		▲3.91
INC(I) gain from JP		Swing	▲13.69	

=== Assembly Election 1978 ===
1978 Maharashtra Legislative Assembly election : Shrivardhan
Party	Candidate	Votes	%	±%
JP	Ukaye A. Shakur A. Karim	31,001	48.65%	New
INC(I)	Raut Ravindra Narayan	26,607	41.76%	New
Margin of victory		4,394	6.90%	▼61.70
Turnout		67,433	63.01%	▲0.85
Total valid votes		63,718		
Registered electors		107,018		▲11.95
JP gain from INC		Swing	▼35.65	

=== Assembly Election 1972 ===
1972 Maharashtra Legislative Assembly election : Shrivardhan
Party	Candidate	Votes	%	±%
INC	A. R. Antulay	47,290	84.30%	▲38.2
ABJS	Anna Thosar	8,808	15.70%	▲3.56
Margin of victory		38,482	68.60%	▲64.26
Turnout		59,769	62.53%	▼6.98
Total valid votes		56,098		
Registered electors		95,592		▲13.70
INC hold		Swing	▲38.20	

=== Assembly Election 1967 ===
1967 Maharashtra Legislative Assembly election : Shrivardhan
Party	Candidate	Votes	%	±%
INC	A. R. Antulay	25,450	46.10%	▼11.39
PWPI	M. L. Dandekar	23,056	41.76%	▲29.51
ABJS	G. S. Karkar	6,700	12.14%	▲7.64
Margin of victory		2,394	4.34%	▼27.40
Turnout		59,485	70.76%	▲5.19
Total valid votes		55,206		
Registered electors		84,071		▲75.20
INC hold		Swing	▼11.39	

=== Assembly Election 1962 ===
1962 Maharashtra Legislative Assembly election : Shrivardhan
Party	Candidate	Votes	%	±%
INC	A. R. Antulay	16,684	57.49%	New
PSP	Digambar Vinayak Purohit	7,475	25.76%	New
PWPI	Yusuf Abdalla Hafiz	3,556	12.25%	New
ABJS	Gopal Narayan Sawant	1,304	4.49%	New
Margin of victory		9,209	31.73%	
Turnout		31,416	65.47%	
Total valid votes		29,019		
Registered electors		47,986		
INC win (new seat)				
