= Sawantwadi Assembly constituency =

Constituency of the Maharashtra legislative assembly in India

Coordinates: 15.91°N 73.82°E

Sawantwadi
- Constituency No. 270 for the Maharashtra Legislative Assembly

Constituency details
- Country: India
- Region: Western India
- State: Maharashtra
- District: Sindhudurg
- Lok Sabha constituency: Ratnagiri-Sindhudurg
- Established: 1952
- Total electors: 230,545
- Reservation: None

Member of Legislative Assembly
- 15th Maharashtra Legislative Assembly
- Incumbent Deepak Vasant Kesarkar
- Party: SHS
- Alliance: NDA
- Elected year: 2019

Sawantwadi-Vengurla-Dodamarg Assembly constituency is one of the 288 Vidhan Sabha (legislative assembly) constituencies of Maharashtra state in western India.

== Overview ==
Sawantwadi constituency is one of the three Vidhan Sabha constituencies located in Sindhudurg district. It comprises the entire Vengurla, Sawantwadi and Dodamarg tehsils of the district.

Sawantwadi is part of Ratnagiri-Sindhudurg Lok Sabha constituency along with five other Vidhan Sabha constituencies, namely Kankavli and Kudal (part of Sindhudurg district) and Chiplun, Ratnagiri and Rajapur (part of Ratnagiri district).

== Members of the Legislative Assembly ==
Year	Member	Party
From 1952 - 1957 see: Savantwadi
1952	Prataprao Deorao Bhonsle	Indian National Congress
1962	Shivramraje (Sawant) Bhonsle	Indian National Congress
1967	Shivramraje (Sawant) Bhonsle	Indian National Congress
1972	Prataprao Deorao Bhonsle	Indian National Congress
1978	Jayanand Mathkar	Janata Party
1980	Shivramraje Sawant-Bhonsle	Indian National Congress (I)
1985	Shivramraje Sawant-Bhonsle	Indian National Congress
1990	Pravin Prataprao Bhonsle	Indian National Congress
1995	Pravin Prataprao Bhonsle	Indian National Congress
1999	Shivram Dalvi	Shiv Sena
2004	Shivram Dalvi	Shiv Sena
2009	Deepak Kesarkar	Nationalist Congress Party
2014	Deepak Kesarkar	Shiv Sena
2019	Deepak Kesarkar	Shiv Sena
2024	Deepak Kesarkar	Shiv Sena

== Election results ==
=== Assembly Election 2024 ===
2024 Maharashtra Legislative Assembly election : Sawantwadi
Party	Candidate	Votes	%	±%
SS	Deepak Vasant Kesarkar	81,008	49.48%	▼0.25
SS(UBT)	Rajan Krishna Teli	41,109	25.11%	New
Independent	Vishal Prabhakar Parab	33,281	20.33%	New
Independent	Archana Ghare Parab	6,174	3.77%	New
NOTA	None of the Above	2,385	1.46%	▼1.05
Independent	Dattaram Vishnu Gaonkar	1,234	0.75%	New
Margin of victory		39,899	24.37%	▲14.94
Turnout		166,090	72.04%	▲8.73
Total valid votes		163,705		
Registered electors		230,545		
SS hold		Swing	▼0.25	

=== Assembly Election 2019 ===
2019 Maharashtra Legislative Assembly election : Sawantwadi
Party	Candidate	Votes	%	±%
SS	Deepak Vasant Kesarkar	69,784	49.74%	▲0.62
Independent	Rajan Krishna Teli	56,556	40.31%	New
NCP	Baban Salgaonkar	5,396	3.85%	▼2.41
NOTA	None of the Above	3,524	2.51%	▲1.46
MNS	Prakash Gopal Redkar	3,409	2.43%	▼1.82
VBA	Satyawan Uttam Jadhav	1,450	1.03%	New
BMP	Dadu Alias Raju Ganesh Kadam	1,391	0.99%	New
Independent	Ajinkya Gawade	1,388	0.99%	New
Margin of victory		13,228	9.43%	▼19.11
Turnout		143,982		▼3.07
Total valid votes		140,309		
Registered electors		225,302		
SS hold		Swing	▲0.62	

=== Assembly Election 2014 ===
2014 Maharashtra Legislative Assembly election : Sawantwadi
Party	Candidate	Votes	%	±%
SS	Deepak Vasant Kesarkar	70,902	49.12%	▲14.85
BJP	Teli Rajan Krishna	29,710	20.58%	New
INC	Chandrakant Dattaram Gawade	25,376	17.58%	New
NCP	Dalvi Suresh Yashawant	9,029	6.25%	▼42.03
MNS	Uparkar (Jiji) Parshuram	6,129	4.25%	New
NOTA	None of the Above	1,515	1.05%	New
ABHM	Ajinkya Dhondu Gawade	882	0.61%	New
Margin of victory		41,192	28.53%	▲14.52
Turnout		145,892		▲0.60
Total valid votes		144,359		
Registered electors		220,928		
SS gain from NCP		Swing	▲0.83	

=== Assembly Election 2009 ===
2009 Maharashtra Legislative Assembly election : Sawantwadi
Party	Candidate	Votes	%	±%
NCP	Deepak Vasant Kesarkar	63,430	48.28%	▲15.46
SS	Dalvi Shivram Gopal	45,012	34.26%	▼2.59
Independent	Pravin Prataprao Bhonsle	19,364	14.74%	New
JD(S)	Baburao Dattaram Dhuri	1,792	1.36%	New
BSP	Sunil Alias Yashwant Vasant Pednekar	1,781	1.36%	▼1.69
Margin of victory		18,418	14.02%	▲9.99
Turnout		131,405	64.76%	▼1.08
Total valid votes		131,379		
Registered electors		202,926		▲25.72
NCP gain from SS		Swing	▲11.43	

=== Assembly Election 2004 ===
2004 Maharashtra Legislative Assembly election : Sawantwadi
Party	Candidate	Votes	%	±%
SS	Dalvi Shivram Gopal	39,152	36.85%	▼3.62
NCP	Bhonsle Pravin Prataprao	34,868	32.82%	▼6.05
Independent	Suresh Yashwant Dalvi	26,782	25.21%	New
BSP	Adv. Anil Sagun Dalvi	3,232	3.04%	New
Independent	Sunil Bhairu Gawade	2,216	2.09%	New
Margin of victory		4,284	4.03%	▲2.44
Turnout		106,279	65.84%	▲14.06
Total valid votes		106,250		
Registered electors		161,412		▲8.18
SS hold		Swing	▼3.62	

=== Assembly Election 1999 ===
1999 Maharashtra Legislative Assembly election : Sawantwadi
Party	Candidate	Votes	%	±%
SS	Dalvi Shivram Gopal	31,254	40.47%	▲11.46
NCP	Pravin Prataprao Bhonsle	30,023	38.87%	New
INC	Vikas Bhalchandra Sawant	15,959	20.66%	▼16.17
Margin of victory		1,231	1.59%	▼6.24
Turnout		82,786	55.48%	▼21.00
Total valid votes		77,236		
Registered electors		149,207		▲0.36
SS gain from INC		Swing	▲3.63	

=== Assembly Election 1995 ===
1995 Maharashtra Legislative Assembly election : Sawantwadi
Party	Candidate	Votes	%	±%
INC	Bhonsle Pravin Prataprao	39,849	36.84%	▼8.56
SS	Palav Varsha Liladhar	31,375	29.00%	▲18.39
JD	Kesarkar Vasant Sitaram	24,535	22.68%	▼10.39
Independent	Bhonsle Satvashiladevi Shivaram Sawant	5,577	5.16%	New
Independent	Ramchandra Sakharam Gavankar	2,321	2.15%	New
Independent	Savant Pandurang Attaram	942	0.87%	New
Independent	Gaonkar Dnyaneshwar Rama	908	0.84%	New
Margin of victory		8,474	7.83%	▼4.49
Turnout		111,342	74.89%	▲9.57
Total valid votes		108,175		
Registered electors		148,673		▲8.82
INC hold		Swing	▼8.56	

=== Assembly Election 1990 ===
1990 Maharashtra Legislative Assembly election : Sawantwadi
Party	Candidate	Votes	%	±%
INC	Bhonsle Pravin Prataprao	39,189	45.40%	▲0.78
JD	Jayanand Mathkar	28,550	33.07%	New
SS	Naik Jaywant Balkrishna	9,158	10.61%	New
Independent	Vasant Sitaram Alias Anna Kesarkar	8,089	9.37%	New
Margin of victory		10,639	12.32%	▲6.08
Turnout		87,996	64.41%	▲12.83
Total valid votes		86,322		
Registered electors		136,617		▲22.10
INC hold		Swing	▲0.78	

=== Assembly Election 1985 ===
1985 Maharashtra Legislative Assembly election : Sawantwadi
Party	Candidate	Votes	%	±%
INC	Shivram Sawant Khem Sawant Bhonsale	25,135	44.61%	New
JP	Jayanand Mathkar	21,617	38.37%	▼0.02
Independent	Vasant Kesarkar	6,276	11.14%	New
Independent	Vijay Kerkar	1,776	3.15%	New
Independent	Balkrishna Raghoba Sawant	1,534	2.72%	New
Margin of victory		3,518	6.24%	▼4.71
Turnout		57,408	51.31%	▲8.73
Total valid votes		56,338		
Registered electors		111,887		▲8.63
INC gain from INC(I)		Swing	▼4.73	

=== Assembly Election 1980 ===
1980 Maharashtra Legislative Assembly election : Sawantwadi
Party	Candidate	Votes	%	±%
INC(I)	Shivram Sawant Khem Sawant Bhonsale	21,156	49.35%	▲47.96
JP	Jayanand Mathakar	16,458	38.39%	▼23.42
BJP	Kanekar Shripad Narsinh	5,256	12.26%	New
Margin of victory		4,698	10.96%	▼19.46
Turnout		43,803	42.53%	▼25.13
Total valid votes		42,870		
Registered electors		102,997		▲2.83
INC(I) gain from JP		Swing	▼12.47	

=== Assembly Election 1978 ===
1978 Maharashtra Legislative Assembly election : Sawantwadi
Party	Candidate	Votes	%	±%
JP	Mathkar Jayanand Shivram	41,331	61.82%	New
INC	Bhalchandra Anant Sawant	20,992	31.40%	▼31.27
Independent	Vasant Sita Ram Kesarkar	2,203	3.29%	New
Independent	Sawant Sawlaram Rajaram	1,406	2.10%	New
INC(I)	Sawant Balkrishna R.	930	1.39%	New
Margin of victory		20,339	30.42%	▼7.89
Turnout		68,955	68.84%	▲9.01
Total valid votes		66,862		
Registered electors		100,163		▲31.09
JP gain from INC		Swing	▼0.85	

=== Assembly Election 1972 ===
1972 Maharashtra Legislative Assembly election : Sawantwadi
Party	Candidate	Votes	%	±%
INC	Pratap Rao Deo Rao Bhosale	27,647	62.67%	▼3.62
SSP	Jaya Nand Shiv Ram Mathkar	10,747	24.36%	New
ABJS	Ganpat Sitaram Kaleskar	5,294	12.00%	▲5.4
Independent	K. R. Sawant Aliast Desai	428	0.97%	New
Margin of victory		16,900	38.31%	▼4.59
Turnout		45,796	59.94%	▼1.01
Total valid votes		44,116		
Registered electors		76,405		▲8.40
INC hold		Swing	▼3.62	

=== Assembly Election 1967 ===
1967 Maharashtra Legislative Assembly election : Sawantwadi
Party	Candidate	Votes	%	±%
INC	Shivram Sawant Khem Sawant Bhonsale	27,452	66.29%	▼14.52
PSP	Jaya Nand Shiv Ram Mathkar	9,686	23.39%	New
ABJS	Ganpat Sitaram Kaleskar	2,732	6.60%	New
PWPI	K. R. Desai	1,544	3.73%	▲0.34
Margin of victory		17,766	42.90%	▼22.11
Turnout		43,988	62.41%	▲12.15
Total valid votes		41,414		
Registered electors		70,487		▲4.28
INC hold		Swing	▼14.52	

=== Assembly Election 1962 ===
1962 Maharashtra Legislative Assembly election : Sawantwadi
Party	Candidate	Votes	%	±%
INC	Shivram Sawant Khem Sawant Bhonsale	25,455	80.81%	New
Independent	Laxman Narayan Govekar	4,978	15.80%	New
PWPI	Rajaram Apa Gawas	1,067	3.39%	New
Margin of victory		20,477	65.01%	
Turnout		34,055	50.38%	
Total valid votes		31,500		
Registered electors		67,597		
INC win (new seat)				

== See also ==
- Sawantvadi
- List of constituencies of Maharashtra Vidhan Sabha
