= Chiplun Assembly constituency =

Constituency of the Maharashtra legislative assembly in India

Coordinates: 17.53°N 73.52°E

Chiplun
- Constituency No. 265 for the Maharashtra Legislative Assembly

Constituency details
- Country: India
- Region: Western India
- State: Maharashtra
- District: Ratnagiri
- Lok Sabha constituency: Ratnagiri-Sindhudurg
- Established: 1957
- Total electors: 276,224
- Reservation: None

Member of Legislative Assembly
- 15th Maharashtra Legislative Assembly
- Incumbent Shekhar Govindrao Nikam
- Party: NCP
- Alliance: NDA
- Elected year: 2024

Chiplun Assembly constituency is one of the 288 Vidhan Sabha (legislative assembly) constituencies of Maharashtra state in western India.

== Overview ==
Chiplun constituency is one of the five Vidhan Sabha constituencies located in Ratnagiri district. It comprises parts of the Chiplun and Sangameshwar tehsils of the district.

Chiplun is part of the Ratnagiri-Sindhudurg Lok Sabha constituency along with five other Vidhan Sabha segments, namely Ratnagiri and Rajapur in Ratnagiri district and Kankavli, Kudal and Sawantwadi in Sindhudurg district.

== Members of the Legislative Assembly ==
Year	Member	Party
1957	Shankar Tambitkar	Communist Party of India
1957	Gangaram Kamble	Scheduled Castes Federation
1962	P. K. Sawant	Indian National Congress
1967	P. K. Sawant	Indian National Congress
1972	P. K. Sawant	Indian National Congress
1978	Rajaram Shinde	Janata Party
1980	Rajaram Shinde	Janata Party
1985	Nishikant Joshi	Indian National Congress
1990	Bapu Khedekar	Shiv Sena
1995	Bhaskar Jadhav	Shiv Sena
1999	Bhaskar Jadhav	Shiv Sena
2004	Rameshbhai Kadam	Nationalist Congress Party
2009	Sadanand Chavan	Shiv Sena
2014	Sadanand Chavan	Shiv Sena
2019	Shekhar Nikam	Nationalist Congress Party
2024	Shekhar Nikam	Nationalist Congress Party

== Election results ==
=== Assembly Election 2024 ===
2024 Maharashtra Legislative Assembly election : Chiplun
Party	Candidate	Votes	%	±%
NCP	Shekhar Govindrao Nikam	96,555	50.76%	New
NCP-SP	Prashant Baban Yadav	89,688	47.15%	New
NOTA	None of the Above	2,320	1.22%	▼0.09
Independent	Shekhar Gangaram Nikam	1,613	0.85%	New
Margin of victory		6,867	3.61%	▼13.43
Turnout		192,532	69.70%	▲3.90
Total valid votes		190,212		
Registered electors		276,224		▲2.17
NCP hold		Swing	▼7.08	

=== Assembly Election 2019 ===
2019 Maharashtra Legislative Assembly election : Chiplun
Party	Candidate	Votes	%	±%
NCP	Shekhar Govindrao Nikam	101,578	57.84%	▲15.78
SS	Sadanand Chavan	71,654	40.80%	▼4.93
BSP	Sachin Laxman Mohite	2,392	1.36%	▲0.40
NOTA	None of the Above	2,297	1.31%	▲0.09
Margin of victory		29,924	17.04%	▲13.37
Turnout		178,173	65.90%	▼1.34
Total valid votes		175,624		
Registered electors		270,366		▲8.28
NCP gain from SS		Swing	▲12.11	

=== Assembly Election 2014 ===
2014 Maharashtra Legislative Assembly election : Chiplun
Party	Candidate	Votes	%	±%
SS	Sadanand Chavan	75,695	45.72%	▼4.41
NCP	Shekhar Govindrao Nikam	69,627	42.06%	▲4.12
BJP	Madhav Bhujang Gawali	9,143	5.52%	New
INC	Kadam Rashami Rajendra	3,702	2.24%	New
Independent	Gopinath Krishnaji Zaple	2,720	1.64%	New
NOTA	None of the Above	2,013	1.22%	New
BSP	Gamare Premdas Shantaram	1,592	0.96%	▼0.60
Republican Sena	Jadhav Sushant Baban	994	0.60%	New
Margin of victory		6,068	3.67%	▼8.52
Turnout		167,596	67.12%	▼1.02
Total valid votes		165,545		
Registered electors		249,688		▲10.85
SS hold		Swing	▼4.41	

=== Assembly Election 2009 ===
2009 Maharashtra Legislative Assembly election : Chiplun
Party	Candidate	Votes	%	±%
SS	Sadanand Chavan	76,015	50.13%	▲44.42
NCP	Kadam Rameshbhai Ramchandra	57,531	37.94%	▼9.71
MNS	Salunke Suryakant Tukaram	10,642	7.02%	New
Independent	Bhojane Nishikant Narayan	3,195	2.11%	New
BSP	Mohite Sameer Vishram	2,368	1.56%	▲0.84
RSPS	Suresh Babu Padyal	1,885	1.24%	New
Margin of victory		18,484	12.19%	▲7.47
Turnout		151,700	67.35%	▼6.92
Total valid votes		151,636		
Registered electors		225,256		▲49.45
SS gain from NCP		Swing	▲2.48	

=== Assembly Election 2004 ===
2004 Maharashtra Legislative Assembly election : Chiplun
Party	Candidate	Votes	%	±%
NCP	Kadam Rameshbhai Ramchandra	53,311	47.65%	▼0.31
Independent	Bhaskar Jadhav	48,025	42.92%	New
SS	Prabhakar Tukaram Shinde	6,394	5.71%	▼44.18
Independent	Udeg Pradeep Shantaram	1,828	1.63%	New
PWPI	Gopal Rambhau Khapre	1,515	1.35%	New
BSP	Hemant Vasant Kamble	811	0.72%	New
Margin of victory		5,286	4.72%	▲2.80
Turnout		111,888	74.24%	▲6.14
Total valid votes		111,884		
Registered electors		150,721		▲11.48
NCP gain from SS		Swing	▼2.24	

=== Assembly Election 1999 ===
1999 Maharashtra Legislative Assembly election : Chiplun
Party	Candidate	Votes	%	±%
SS	Bhaskar Jadhav	45,926	49.89%	▲1.09
NCP	Rameshbhai Kadam	44,150	47.96%	New
INC	Dabholkar Sudhir Sakharam	1,720	1.87%	▼39.76
Margin of victory		1,776	1.93%	▼5.24
Turnout		95,062	70.32%	▼9.70
Total valid votes		92,054		
Registered electors		135,194		▲3.07
SS hold		Swing	▲1.09	

=== Assembly Election 1995 ===
1995 Maharashtra Legislative Assembly election : Chiplun
Party	Candidate	Votes	%	±%
SS	Bhaskar Jadhav	49,795	48.80%	▲11.30
INC	Balasaheb Bendu Mate	42,476	41.63%	▲18.07
Independent	Burate Shantaram Vithoba	6,948	6.81%	New
Independent	Prabhakar Jadhav	1,440	1.41%	New
BSP	Kadam Shantaram Ganpat	797	0.78%	New
Margin of victory		7,319	7.17%	▲6.40
Turnout		104,333	79.54%	▲11.12
Total valid votes		102,030		
Registered electors		131,164		▲5.45
SS hold		Swing	▲11.30	

=== Assembly Election 1990 ===
1990 Maharashtra Legislative Assembly election : Chiplun
Party	Candidate	Votes	%	±%
SS	Bapu Khedekar	31,103	37.51%	New
Independent	Balasaheb Mate	30,460	36.73%	New
INC	Nishikant Madhao	19,539	23.56%	▼29.34
JD	Salvi Shankar	1,820	2.19%	New
Margin of victory		643	0.78%	▼31.93
Turnout		84,462	67.90%	▲6.49
Total valid votes		82,922		
Registered electors		124,387		▲30.67
SS gain from INC		Swing	▼15.39	

=== Assembly Election 1985 ===
1985 Maharashtra Legislative Assembly election : Chiplun
Party	Candidate	Votes	%	±%
INC	Joshi Nishikani Madhao	30,300	52.90%	New
Independent	Vasantrao Balwantrao Shinde	11,565	20.19%	New
JP	Abu Dalvai	10,026	17.50%	▼26.20
Independent	R. B. Gaikwad	4,416	7.71%	New
Independent	Lalmani Dube	509	0.89%	New
Independent	Saadat Alli Abdul Kadir Kadiri	460	0.80%	New
Margin of victory		18,735	32.71%	▲19.15
Turnout		58,560	61.52%	▲3.05
Total valid votes		57,276		
Registered electors		95,189		▲6.82
INC gain from JP		Swing	▲9.20	

=== Assembly Election 1980 ===
1980 Maharashtra Legislative Assembly election : Chiplun
Party	Candidate	Votes	%	±%
JP	Rajaram Shinde	22,245	43.70%	▼3.24
INC(I)	Shinde Raghunath Gopalrao	15,340	30.14%	▲28.67
Independent	Govindrao Nikam	13,110	25.75%	New
Margin of victory		6,905	13.57%	▼1.64
Turnout		52,156	58.53%	▼12.66
Total valid votes		50,903		
Registered electors		89,111		▲3.16
JP hold		Swing	▼3.24	

=== Assembly Election 1978 ===
1978 Maharashtra Legislative Assembly election : Chiplun
Party	Candidate	Votes	%	±%
JP	Shinde Rajaram Keshav	28,293	46.94%	New
INC	Shinde Vasantrao Balwantrao	19,128	31.73%	▼53.90
Independent	Betkar Krishna Laxman	11,974	19.87%	New
INC(I)	Shinde Appasaheb Bapujirao	881	1.46%	New
Margin of victory		9,165	15.21%	▼56.06
Turnout		62,234	72.05%	▲20.71
Total valid votes		60,276		
Registered electors		86,381		▲5.58
JP gain from INC		Swing	▼38.70	

=== Assembly Election 1972 ===
1972 Maharashtra Legislative Assembly election : Chiplun
Party	Candidate	Votes	%	±%
INC	Parashuram Krishnaji Sawant	34,379	85.63%	▲32.52
ABJS	Rajaram Gangaram Ghag	5,767	14.37%	▼10.29
Margin of victory		28,612	71.27%	▲42.82
Turnout		42,011	51.35%	▼10.38
Total valid votes		40,146		
Registered electors		81,817		▲14.68
INC hold		Swing	▲32.52	

=== Assembly Election 1967 ===
1967 Maharashtra Legislative Assembly election : Chiplun
Party	Candidate	Votes	%	±%
INC	Parashuram Krishnaji Sawant	22,528	53.11%	▼2.47
ABJS	R. G. Ghag	10,459	24.66%	▲8.64
Independent	S. B. Mohite	5,472	12.90%	New
PSP	A. M. Dalawai	3,956	9.33%	▼8.47
Margin of victory		12,069	28.45%	▼9.33
Turnout		45,347	63.56%	▲5.63
Total valid votes		42,415		
Registered electors		71,346		▲15.65
INC hold		Swing	▼2.47	

=== Assembly Election 1962 ===
1962 Maharashtra Legislative Assembly election : Chiplun
Party	Candidate	Votes	%	±%
INC	Parashuram Krishnaji Sawant	18,452	55.58%	▲37.91
PSP	Abubakarkhan Mahamadkhan Dalwai	5,909	17.80%	New
ABJS	Raghunath Bhavrao Shinde	5,317	16.02%	New
CPI	Shankar Ganu Tambitkar	3,521	10.61%	▼24.6
Margin of victory		12,543	37.78%	▲34.66
Turnout		36,130	58.57%	▼27.04
Total valid votes		33,199		
Registered electors		61,690		▼42.36
INC gain from CPI		Swing	▲20.37	

=== Assembly Election 1957 ===
1957 Bombay State Legislative Assembly election : Chiplun
Party	Candidate	Votes	%	±%
CPI	Tambitkar Shankar Ganu	30,469	35.21%	New
SCF	Kambale Gangaram Bhikaji (Sc)	27,769	32.09%	New
INC	Khedekar Sudkoji Baburao (Sc)	15,294	17.67%	New
INC	Sawant Parsharam Krishnarao	13,015	15.04%	New
Margin of victory		2,700	3.12%	
Turnout		86,547	80.86%	
Total valid votes		86,547		
Registered electors		107,033		
CPI win (new seat)				

== See also ==
- Chiplun
- List of constituencies of Maharashtra Vidhan Sabha
- Walope
