= Rajapur Assembly constituency =

Constituency of the Maharashtra legislative assembly in India

Coordinates: 16.66°N 73.52°E

Rajapur
- Constituency No. 267 for the Maharashtra Legislative Assembly

Constituency details
- Country: India
- Region: Western India
- State: Maharashtra
- District: Ratnagiri
- Lok Sabha constituency: Ratnagiri-Sindhudurg
- Established: 1952
- Total electors: 238,455
- Reservation: None

Member of Legislative Assembly
- 15th Maharashtra Legislative Assembly
- Incumbent Kiran Samant
- Party: SHS
- Alliance: NDA
- Elected year: 2024

Rajapur Assembly constituency is one of the 288 Vidhan Sabha (legislative assembly) constituencies of Maharashtra state in western India.

== Overview ==
Rajapur constituency is one of the five Vidhan Sabha constituencies located in the Ratnagiri district. It comprises the entire Rajapur and Lanja tehsils and part of Sangameshwar tehsil of the district.

Rajapur is part of the Ratnagiri-Sindhudurg Lok Sabha constituency along with five other Vidhan Sabha segments, namely Ratnagiri and Chiplun in Ratnagiri district and Kankavli, Kudal and Sawantwadi in the Sindhudurg district.

== Members of the Legislative Assembly ==
Election	Member	Party
1952	Subhedar Sitaram Murari	Indian National Congress
1957	Prabhat Mahadeo Kulkarni	Praja Socialist Party
1962	Sahadev Mukund Thakre	Indian National Congress
1967	Laxman Rangnath Hatankar	Praja Socialist Party
1972	Sahadev Mukund Thakre	Indian National Congress
1978	Laxman Rangnath Hatankar	Janata Party
1980	Narayan Sakharam Tavade	Janata Party
1985	Laxman Rangnath Hatankar	Indian National Congress
1990	Laxman Rangnath Hatankar	Indian National Congress
1995	Vijayrao alias Appa Salvi	Shiv Sena
1999	Ganpat Daulat Kadam	Shiv Sena
2004	Ganpat Daulat Kadam	Shiv Sena
2006 By-election	Ganpat Daulat Kadam	Indian National Congress
2009	Rajan Prabhakar Salvi	Shiv Sena
2014	Rajan Prabhakar Salvi	Shiv Sena
2019	Rajan Prabhakar Salvi	Shiv Sena
2024	Kiran Samant	Shiv Sena

== Election results ==
=== Assembly Election 2024 ===
2024 Maharashtra Legislative Assembly election : Rajapur
Party	Candidate	Votes	%	±%
SS	Kiran Samant	80,256	52.53%	▲2.13
SS(UBT)	Rajan Prabhakar Salvi	60,579	39.65%	New
Independent	Avinash Shantaram Lad	7,945	5.20%	New
NOTA	None of the above	1,834	1.20%	▼0.78
Independent	Amrut Tambade (Dada)	1,204	0.79%	New
Independent	Rajendra Ravindranath Salvi	1,074	0.70%	New
BSP	Jadhav Sandeep Vishram	1,065	0.70%	▼0.42
Margin of victory		19,677	12.88%	▲3.73
Turnout		154,615	64.84%	▲9.11
Total valid votes		152,781		
Registered electors		238,455		▲0.24
SS hold		Swing	▲2.13	

=== Assembly Election 2019 ===
2019 Maharashtra Legislative Assembly election : Rajapur
Party	Candidate	Votes	%	±%
SS	Rajan Prabhakar Salvi	65,433	50.40%	▼3.67
INC	Avinash Shantaram Lad	53,557	41.26%	▲14.89
MNS	Avinash Dhondu Soundalkar	6,150	4.74%	New
NOTA	None of the above	2,576	1.98%	▲0.61
ABHM	Vilas Rajaram Khanvilker	1,862	1.43%	▲0.10
BSP	Mahendra Dharma Pawar	1,454	1.12%	▼0.43
Margin of victory		11,876	9.15%	▼18.54
Turnout		132,569	55.73%	▼5.37
Total valid votes		129,816		
Registered electors		237,887		▲1.59
SS hold		Swing	▼3.67	

=== Assembly Election 2014 ===
2014 Maharashtra Legislative Assembly election : Rajapur
Party	Candidate	Votes	%	±%
SS	Rajan Prabhakar Salvi	76,266	54.07%	▲2.03
INC	Desai Rajendra Alias Rajan Yashwant	37,204	26.37%	▼8.36
NCP	Ajit Ramesh Yashwanthrao	11,923	8.45%	New
BJP	Yadav Sanjay Atmaram	9,953	7.06%	New
BSP	Anand Babu Kamble	2,193	1.55%	▼0.98
NOTA	None of the above	1,935	1.37%	New
ABHM	Pramila Bharati	1,875	1.33%	▲0.03
BMP	Ramesh Dhakta Pajve	895	0.63%	New
Margin of victory		39,062	27.69%	▲10.38
Turnout		143,077	61.10%	▼4.95
Total valid votes		141,062		
Registered electors		234,159		▲10.85
SS hold		Swing	▲2.03	

=== Assembly Election 2009 ===
2009 Maharashtra Legislative Assembly election : Rajapur
Party	Candidate	Votes	%	±%
SS	Rajan Prabhakar Salvi	72,574	52.04%	▲7.22
INC	Kadam Ganpat Daulat	48,433	34.73%	▼14.04
MNS	Saundalkar Avinash Dhondu	5,390	3.87%	New
Independent	Matkar Shantaram Keshav	4,599	3.30%	New
BSP	Agre Hemant Shankar	3,529	2.53%	New
JD(S)	Arte Yuyutsu Ramakant	3,119	2.24%	New
ABHM	Bharati Pramila Gambhirrai	1,809	1.30%	▼1.38
Margin of victory		24,141	17.31%	▲13.36
Turnout		139,521	66.05%	▼1.25
Total valid votes		139,453		
Registered electors		211,245		▲51.46
SS gain from INC		Swing	▲3.27	

=== Assembly By-election 2006 ===
2006 Maharashtra Legislative Assembly by-election : Rajapur
Party	Candidate	Votes	%	±%
INC	Kadam Ganpat Daulat	45,778	48.77%	▲10.17
SS	Rajan Prabhakar Salvi	42,070	44.82%	▼11.25
Independent	Gothankar Mahadeo Krishnaji	3,502	3.73%	New
ABHM	Khanvilkar Vilasrao Rajaram	2,518	2.68%	▼2.65
Margin of victory		3,708	3.95%	▼13.53
Turnout		93,869	67.30%	▲0.69
Total valid votes		93,868		
Registered electors		139,476		▼0.26
INC gain from SS		Swing	▼7.30	

=== Assembly Election 2004 ===
2004 Maharashtra Legislative Assembly election : Rajapur
Party	Candidate	Votes	%	±%
SS	Kadam Ganpat Daulat	52,231	56.07%	▲10.99
INC	Harish Sitaram Rogye	35,952	38.60%	▲7.58
ABHM	Bharati Pramila Gambhirrai	4,963	5.33%	New
Margin of victory		16,279	17.48%	▲3.41
Turnout		93,147	66.61%	▲7.97
Total valid votes		93,146		
Registered electors		139,839		▲3.50
SS hold		Swing	▲10.99	

=== Assembly Election 1999 ===
1999 Maharashtra Legislative Assembly election : Rajapur
Party	Candidate	Votes	%	±%
SS	Kadam Ganpat Daulat	32,619	45.08%	▼13.27
INC	Hatankar Laxman Rangnath	22,441	31.02%	▲3.18
NCP	Arvind Shirsekar	9,415	13.01%	New
Independent	Salavi Vijayrao Alias Appa	5,800	8.02%	New
Independent	Pajave Ramesh Dhakata	1,562	2.16%	New
Independent	Vishwasarao Vamanrao Ramachandra	515	0.71%	New
Margin of victory		10,178	14.07%	▼16.44
Turnout		79,235	58.64%	▼17.61
Total valid votes		72,352		
Registered electors		135,112		▼0.56
SS hold		Swing	▼13.27	

=== Assembly Election 1995 ===
1995 Maharashtra Legislative Assembly election : Rajapur
Party	Candidate	Votes	%	±%
SS	Appa Alias Vijayrao Salvi	58,550	58.35%	▲23.90
INC	Hatankar Laxman Rangnath	27,935	27.84%	▼20.20
JD	Malpekar Ramakant Shantaram	8,670	8.64%	▼7.04
Independent	Bhitale Raghunath Tanu	1,738	1.73%	New
Samajwadi Janata Party (Maharashtra)	Pawar Bhagaji Hari	1,634	1.63%	New
Independent	Vichare Ramesh Krishnarao	1,246	1.24%	New
Margin of victory		30,615	30.51%	▲16.92
Turnout		103,609	76.25%	▲8.24
Total valid votes		100,342		
Registered electors		135,879		▲5.05
SS gain from INC		Swing	▲10.31	

=== Assembly Election 1990 ===
1990 Maharashtra Legislative Assembly election : Rajapur
Party	Candidate	Votes	%	±%
INC	Hatankar Laxman Rangnath	41,197	48.04%	▼3.96
SS	Narvekar Chandrakant Balkrishna	29,543	34.45%	New
JD	Kaviskar Suhas	13,445	15.68%	New
Independent	Kamaluddin Shamsuddin Wadekar	892	1.04%	New
Independent	Ayare Anant Ramchandra	678	0.79%	New
Margin of victory		11,654	13.59%	▼0.31
Turnout		87,973	68.01%	▲8.67
Total valid votes		85,755		
Registered electors		129,350		▲18.67
INC hold		Swing	▼3.96	

=== Assembly Election 1985 ===
1985 Maharashtra Legislative Assembly election : Rajapur
Party	Candidate	Votes	%	±%
INC	Hatankar Laxman Rangnath	32,726	52.00%	New
JP	Bhikajirao Chavan	23,977	38.10%	New
Independent	Khanvilkar Manmohan Pandurang	2,989	4.75%	New
Independent	Vichare Ramesh Krishnarao	1,579	2.51%	New
Independent	Ramdas N. Rumde	925	1.47%	New
Independent	Kamaluddin Shamsuddin Wadekar	741	1.18%	New
Margin of victory		8,749	13.90%	▲5.02
Turnout		64,677	59.34%	▲13.91
Total valid votes		62,937		
Registered electors		109,001		▲6.50
INC gain from JP		Swing	▲12.40	

=== Assembly Election 1980 ===
1980 Maharashtra Legislative Assembly election : Rajapur
Party	Candidate	Votes	%	±%
JP	Tavade Narayan Sakharam	17,875	39.60%	New
INC(I)	Thakare Sahadeo Mukund	13,865	30.72%	▲28.85
Independent	Tatankar Laxman Rangannath	12,265	27.17%	New
Independent	Rumade Ramdas Namdeo	1,131	2.51%	New
Margin of victory		4,010	8.88%	▼39.27
Turnout		46,501	45.43%	▼22.70
Total valid votes		45,136		
Registered electors		102,351		▲2.13
JP gain from JP		Swing	▼31.07	

=== Assembly Election 1978 ===
1978 Maharashtra Legislative Assembly election : Rajapur
Party	Candidate	Votes	%	±%
JP	Hatankar Laxman Rangnath	46,099	70.67%	New
INC	Thakare Sahadeo Mukund	14,693	22.53%	▼29.20
Independent	Rumade Ramdas Namdeo	2,224	3.41%	New
INC(I)	Ayare Anant Ramchandra	1,217	1.87%	New
Independent	Kazi Fakir Mohammad	996	1.53%	New
Margin of victory		31,406	48.15%	▲42.87
Turnout		68,276	68.13%	▲5.79
Total valid votes		65,229		
Registered electors		100,219		▲39.49
JP gain from INC		Swing	▲18.94	

=== Assembly Election 1972 ===
1972 Maharashtra Legislative Assembly election : Rajapur
Party	Candidate	Votes	%	±%
INC	Sahadev Mukund Thakre	22,006	51.73%	▲22.78
SSP	Laxman Rangnath Hatankar	19,761	46.46%	New
Independent	Sadanand Shivram Chawan	770	1.81%	New
Margin of victory		2,245	5.28%	▼24.36
Turnout		44,786	62.34%	▼0.33
Total valid votes		42,537		
Registered electors		71,845		▲4.92
INC gain from PSP		Swing	▼6.86	

=== Assembly Election 1967 ===
1967 Maharashtra Legislative Assembly election : Rajapur
Party	Candidate	Votes	%	±%
PSP	Laxman Rangnath Hatankar	23,156	58.59%	▲27.75
INC	Sahadev Mukund Thakre	11,443	28.95%	▼10.49
ABJS	P. R. Kinare	3,748	9.48%	New
Independent	K. F. M. Daood	1,174	2.97%	New
Margin of victory		11,713	29.64%	▲21.04
Turnout		42,918	62.67%	▲17.40
Total valid votes		39,521		
Registered electors		68,479		▲31.67
PSP gain from INC		Swing	▲19.15	

=== Assembly Election 1962 ===
1962 Maharashtra Legislative Assembly election : Rajapur
Party	Candidate	Votes	%	±%
INC	Sahadev Mukund Thakre	8,408	39.44%	▲14.78
PSP	Laxman Rangnath Hatankar	6,574	30.84%	▼44.50
ABJS	Purshottam Anant Shetye	4,667	21.89%	New
PWPI	Wasudev Pandurang Chavan	1,669	7.83%	New
Margin of victory		1,834	8.60%	▼42.09
Turnout		23,544	45.27%	▲4.30
Total valid votes		21,318		
Registered electors		52,007		▲4.27
INC gain from PSP		Swing	▼35.90	

=== Assembly Election 1957 ===
1957 Bombay State Legislative Assembly election : Rajapur
Party	Candidate	Votes	%	±%
PSP	Kulkarni Prabhat Mahadeo	15,394	75.34%	New
INC	Subhedar Sitaram Murari	5,038	24.66%	▼16.40
Margin of victory		10,356	50.69%	▲32.60
Turnout		20,432	40.97%	▲7.58
Total valid votes		20,432		
Registered electors		49,876		▼10.24
PSP gain from INC		Swing	▲34.28	

=== Assembly Election 1952 ===
1952 Bombay State Legislative Assembly election : Rajapur
Party	Candidate	Votes	%	±%
INC	Subhedar Sitaram Murari	7,618	41.06%	New
Socialist	Narkar Gopal Balkrishna	4,261	22.96%	New
Independent	Thakurdesai Mahadeo Vasudeo	2,246	12.10%	New
PWPI	Murtuza. S. A	2,158	11.63%	New
Independent	Karangutkar Hari Sakharam	1,251	6.74%	New
Independent	Karambelkar Ramchandra Pandurang	1,021	5.50%	New
Margin of victory		3,357	18.09%	
Turnout		18,555	33.39%	
Total valid votes		18,555		
Registered electors		55,567		
INC win (new seat)				

== See also ==
- Rajapur
- List of constituencies of Maharashtra Vidhan Sabha
