= Rajan Salvi =

Indian politician

Member of Legislative Assembly of Maharashtra
- In office 2009–2024
- Preceded by: Ganpat Kadam
- Succeeded by: Kiran Samant
- Constituency: Rajapur

Personal details
- Party: Shiv Sena

Rajan Salvi is a Shiv Sena politician from Ratnagiri district, Maharashtra. He was a member of Legislative Assembly from Rajapur Vidhan Sabha constituency of Konkan, Maharashtra, India as a member of Shiv Sena, from 2009 to 2024. He was elected for three consecutive terms in the Maharashtra Legislative Assembly for 2009, 2014 and 2019. He lost the 2024 poll to Kiran Samant.

Rajan Salvi contested for Assembly Speaker Post against BJP's Rahul Narwekar in 2022 as Maha Vikas Aghadi (MVA) candidate.

== Positions held ==
- 2009: Elected to Maharashtra Legislative Assembly
- 2014: Re-Elected to Maharashtra Legislative Assembly
- 2019: Elected to Maharashtra Legislative Assembly

== See also ==
- Ratnagiri–Sindhudurg Lok Sabha constituency
- Raigad Lok Sabha constituency
