= Nilesh Narayan Rane =

Indian politician (born 1981)

Member of Maharashtra Legislative Assembly
- Incumbent
- Assumed office 23 November 2024
- Preceded by: Vaibhav Naik
- Constituency: Kudal

Member of Parliament, Lok Sabha
- In office 17 May 2009 — 18 May 2014
- Preceded by: Constituency established
- Succeeded by: Vinayak Raut
- Constituency: Ratnagiri-Sindhudurg, Maharashtra

Personal details
- Born: 17 March 1981 (age 45) Maharashtra, India
- Party: Shiv Sena (since 2024)
- Other political affiliations: Maharashtra Swabhiman Paksha (2017-2019); Bharatiya Janata Party (2019-2024); Indian National Congress (2009-2017)
- Spouse: Priyanka Rane (m. 2007)
- Children: Abhiraj Rane
- Parent: Narayan Rane (father)
- Relatives: Nitesh Rane (brother)
- Occupation: Politician

Nilesh Narayan Rane (born 17 March 1981) is an Indian politician. He is from Maharashtra, a state in Western India. He is a son of Narayan Rane, former Chief Minister of Maharashtra & former Union Cabinet Minister of MSME.

== Personal life ==
Rane is the son of former union cabinet minister Narayan Rane. His brother, Nitesh Narayan Rane, represents Kankavli constituency in Maharashtra Legislative Assembly.

== Political career ==
Rane was elected to 15th Lok Sabha of India from Ratnagiri-Sindhudurg constituency of Maharashtra as a member of Indian National Congress (INC).

As part of the 15th Lok Sabha, Rane served on the Committee on Home Affairs and the Rules Committee.

Rane contested from same constituency for a seat in 16th Lok Sabha, but lost to Shiv Sena candidate Vinayak Raut.

As of 2019, he was a member of the Bharatiya Janata Party (BJP).

In 2024, he switched over to Shiv Sena from BJP to contest as a Maha Yuti candidate in 2024 Maharashtra Legislative Assembly election from Kudal Assembly constituency which he won that seat by a margin of 8,176 votes.
