= Sadanand Chavan =

Indian politician

Member of Legislative Assembly of Maharashtra
- In office 2009–2019
- Preceded by: Rameshbhai Kadam
- Succeeded by: Shekhar Nikam
- Constituency: Chiplun

Personal details
- Born: 23/09/1963 Chiplun
- Party: Independent

Sadanand Chavan is an independent politician from Ratnagiri district, Maharashtra, India. He was a Member of Legislative Assembly from Chiplun Vidhan Sabha constituency of Konkan, Maharashtra as an independent. He has been elected to the Maharashtra Legislative Assembly for 2009 and 2014.

== Positions held ==
- 2009: Elected to Maharashtra Legislative Assembly
- 2014: Re-elected to Maharashtra Legislative Assembly

== See also ==
- Ratnagiri–Sindhudurg Lok Sabha constituency
- Raigad Lok Sabha constituency
