= Vaibhav Naik =

Indian politician

Vaibhav Vijay Naik

Member of Legislative Assembly of Maharashtra
- In office 19 October 2014 – 23 November 2024
- Preceded by: Narayan Rane
- Succeeded by: Nilesh Rane
- Constituency: Kudal

Personal details
- Party: Shiv Sena (UBT)

Vaibhav Vijay Naik is a Shiv Sena (UBT) politician from Sindhudurg district, Maharashtra. He is currently a member of the Legislative Assembly from Kudal Vidhan Sabha constituency of Konkan, Maharashtra, India as a member of Shiv Sena. He defeated the then Industries Minister Narayan Rane in the 2014 Assembly polls by a margin of 10,376 votes.

== Positions held ==
- 2014: Elected to Maharashtra Legislative Assembly
- 2019: Elected to Maharashtra Legislative Assembly

== See also ==
- Ratnagiri–Sindhudurg Lok Sabha constituency
