= Ratnagiri–Sindhudurg Lok Sabha constituency =

Lok Sabha constituency in Maharashtra

Coordinates: 16.7°N 73.4°E

Ratnagiri–Sindhudurg
- Lok Sabha constituency
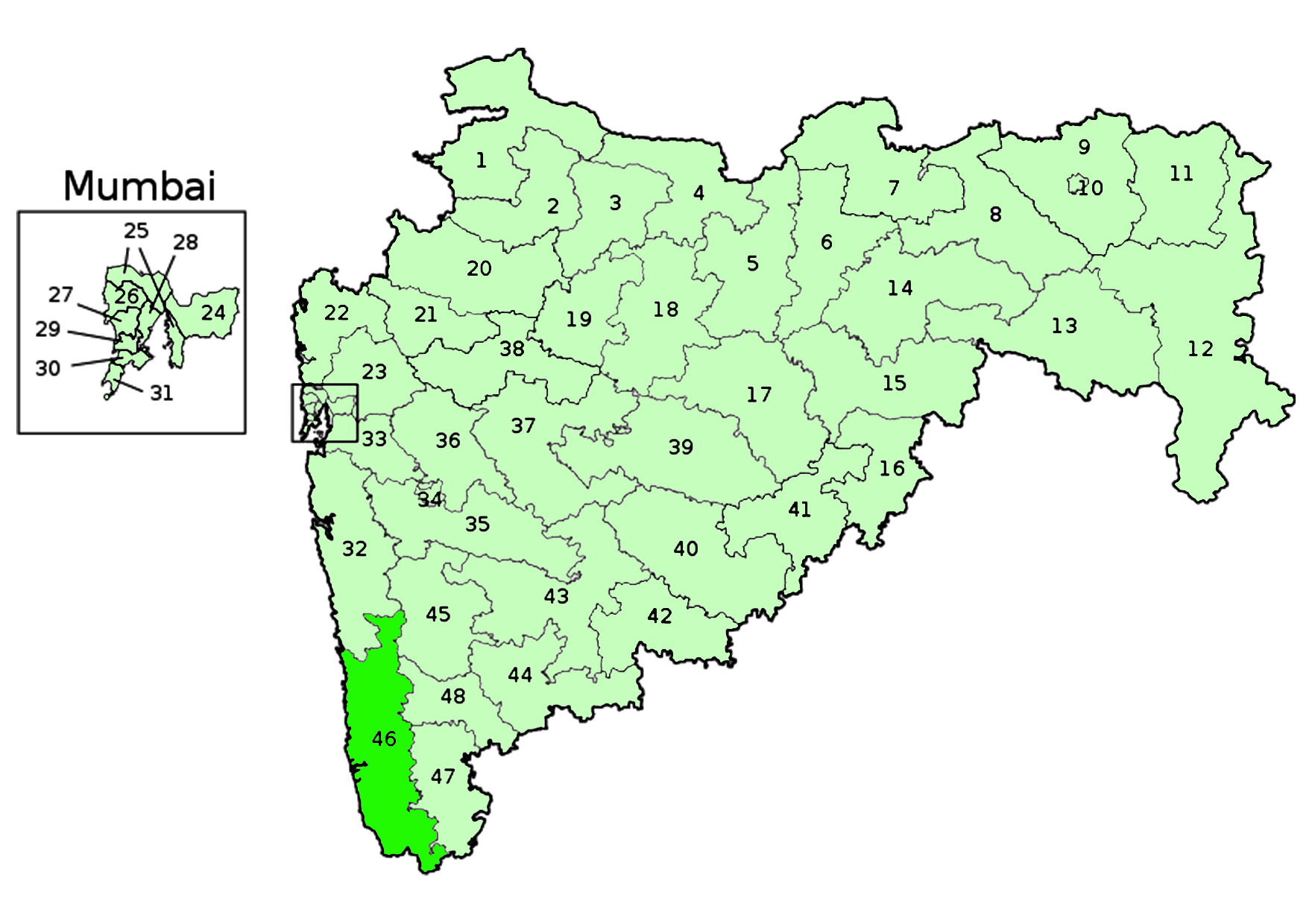

Constituency details
- Country: India
- Region: Western India
- State: Maharashtra
- Assembly constituencies: Chiplun; Ratnagiri; Rajapur; Kankavli; Kudal; Sawantwadi
- Established: 2008–present
- Total electors: 1,367,361
- Reservation: None

Member of Parliament
- 18th Lok Sabha
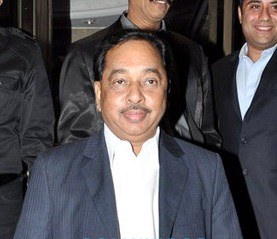
- Incumbent Narayan Rane
- Party: Bharatiya Janata Party
- Elected year: 2024

Ratnagiri–Sindhudurg is one of the 48 Lok Sabha (lower house of Indian parliament) constituencies of Maharashtra state in western India. This constituency was created on 19 February 2008 as a part of the implementation of the Presidential notification based on the recommendations of the Delimitation Commission of India constituted on 12 July 2002. It first held elections in 2009 and its first member of parliament (MP) was Nilesh Rane of the Indian National Congress. As of the 2024 elections, its current MP is Narayan Rane of Bharatiya Janata Party

== Assembly segments ==
At present, Ratnagiri–Sindhudurg Lok Sabha constituency comprises six Vidhan Sabha (legislative assembly) segments. These segments are:

#	Name	District	Member	Party	Leading (in 2024)
265	Chiplun	Ratnagiri	Shekhar Nikam	NCP	SS(UBT)
266	Ratnagiri	Ratnagiri	Uday Samant	SHS	SS(UBT)
267	Rajapur	Ratnagiri	Kiran Samant	SHS	SS(UBT)
268	Kankavli	Sindhudurg	Nitesh Rane	BJP	BJP
269	Kudal	Sindhudurg	Nilesh Rane	SHS	BJP
270	Sawantwadi	Sindhudurg	Deepak Kesarkar	SHS	BJP

== Members of Parliament ==
Year	Name	Party
Before 2008 : See Ratnagiri and Rajapur
2009	Nilesh Rane	Indian National Congress
2014	Vinayak Raut	Shiv Sena
2019	Vinayak Raut	Shiv Sena
2024	Narayan Rane	Bharatiya Janata Party

== Election results ==
=== General election 2024 ===
2024 Indian general elections: Ratnagiri-Sindhudurg
Party	Candidate	Votes	%	±%
BJP	Narayan Rane	448,514	49.07	New
SS(UBT)	Vinayak Raut	4,00,656	43.83	New
Independent	Vinayak Lavu Raut	15,826	1.73	N/A
NOTA	None of the above	11,643	1.27	▼0.26
VBA	Maruti Ramachandra Joshi	10,039	1.10	N/A
Majority		47,858	5.23	▼14.56
Turnout		9,16,994	63.12	▲1.13
BJP gain from SS		Swing		

=== General election 2019 ===
2019 Indian general elections: Ratnagiri-Sindhudurg
Party	Candidate	Votes	%	±%
SS	Vinayak Raut	458,022	50.83	−4.19
MSHP	Nilesh Narayan Rane	2,79,700	31.04	
INC	Navinchandra Bandivadekar	63,299	7.02	−31.25
NOTA	None of the above	13,777	1.53	
Majority		1,78,322	19.79	
Turnout		9,02,355	61.99	
SS gain from MSHP		Swing		

=== General election 2014 ===
2014 Indian general elections: Ratnagiri–Sindhudurg
Party	Candidate	Votes	%	±%
SS	Vinayak Raut	493,088	55.02	+12.28
INC	Nilesh Rane	3,43,037	38.27	−10.97
BSP	Aayre Rajendra Lahu	13,088	1.46	−0.69
AAP	Abhijit Shriram Hegshetye	12,700	1.42	N/A
IND	Sunil Alias Yashwant Vasant Pednekar	7,328	0.82	N/A
IND	Arun Harishchandra Manjrekar	5,999	0.67	N/A
Socialist Party (India)	Dipak Dattaram Nevgi	2,904	0.32	N/A
IND	Ajinkya Dhondu Gawade	2,332	0.26	N/A
BMP	Birje Yashwant Anant	1,992	0.22	N/A
ABHM	Vinod Sawant	1,395	0.16	−0.18
NOTA	None of the above	12,393	1.38	N/A
Margin of victory		1,50,051	16.75	+10.25
Turnout		8,96,409	65.56	+8.17
Registered electors		13,67,362		
MSHP gain from INC		Swing	+11.63	

=== General election 2009 ===
2009 Indian general elections: Ratnagiri-Sindhudurg
Party	Candidate	Votes	%	±%
INC	Nilesh Rane	353,915	49.24	
SS	Suresh Prabhu	3,07,165	42.74	
IND	Surendra Borkar	18,858	2.62	
BSP	Jayendra Parulekar	15,469	2.15	
Kranti Kari Jai Hind Sena	Ajay Alias Aaba Dada Jadhav	7,405	1.03	
BBM	Siraj Abdulla Kauchali	6,587	0.92	
IND	Khalape Akbar Mahammad	4,516	0.63	
ABHM	Vilasrao Khanvilkar	2,448	0.34	
RSPS	Rajesh Purushottam Surve	2,358	0.33	
Margin of victory		46,750	6.50	
Turnout		7,18,721	57.39	N/A
Registered electors		12,52,345		
INC gain from SS		Swing		

== See also ==
- Rajapur Lok Sabha constituency
- Ratnagiri Lok Sabha constituency
- Raigad Lok Sabha constituency
- Ratnagiri district
- Sindhudurg district
