= Malvan Assembly constituency =

Former constituency of the Maharashtra legislative assembly in India

Coordinates: 19.241°N 73.133°E

Malvan
- Former constituency for the Maharashtra Legislative Assembly

Constituency details
- Country: India
- Region: Western India
- State: Maharashtra
- District: Sindhudurg district
- Established: 1952
- Abolished: 2008

Malvan (formerly Malwan) was one of the constituencies of Maharashtra Vidhan Sabha, in India. It was a segment of the Ratnagiri Lok Sabha constituency. Malvan seat's last election was in 2004 and it was defunct from 2009.

== Members of the Legislative Assembly ==
Election	Member	Party
1952	Mahajan Shripad Sadashiv	Indian National Congress
1957	Manjarekar Shridhar Balkrishna	Bharatiya Jana Sangh
1962	Shyam Gangaram Kocharekar	Praja Socialist Party
1967	Vijaysingh G. Prabhugaonkar	Indian National Congress
1972	Vijaysingh G. Prabhugaonkar	Indian National Congress
1978	Dalvi Yashwant Babaji	Janata Party
1980	Keshavrao Vyankatesh Rane	Indian National Congress
1985	Prabhugaokar Bapusahed	Indian National Congress
1990	Narayan Tatu Rane	Shiv Sena
1995	Narayan Tatu Rane	Shiv Sena
1999	Narayan Tatu Rane	Shiv Sena
2004	Narayan Tatu Rane	Shiv Sena
2005 By-election	Narayan Tatu Rane	Indian National Congress

== Election results ==
=== Assembly By-election 2005 ===
2005 Maharashtra Legislative Assembly by-election : Malvan
Party	Candidate	Votes	%	±%
INC	Narayan Tatu Rane	78,616	83.76%	▲53.15
SS	Uparkar Parshoram Alias Jiji	15,244	16.24%	▼49.64
Margin of victory		63,372	67.52%	▲32.25
Turnout		93,861	70.85%	▼1.69
Total valid votes		93,860		
Registered electors		132,486		▼0.76
INC gain from SS		Swing	▲17.88	

=== Assembly Election 2004 ===
2004 Maharashtra Legislative Assembly election : Malvan
Party	Candidate	Votes	%	±%
SS	Narayan Tatu Rane	63,784	65.88%	▲4.15
INC	Vijay Sawant	29,639	30.61%	▲9.97
SP	Nandkumar Shridhar Sawant	1,779	1.84%	New
BSP	Sharad Bhowar	1,612	1.67%	New
Margin of victory		34,145	35.27%	▼5.82
Turnout		96,846	72.54%	▲15.44
Total valid votes		96,814		
Registered electors		133,498		▲7.99
SS hold		Swing	▲4.15	

=== Assembly Election 1999 ===
1999 Maharashtra Legislative Assembly election : Malvan
Party	Candidate	Votes	%	±%
SS	Narayan Tatu Rane	41,028	61.73%	▲4.51
INC	Nandkumar Shridhar Sawant	13,718	20.64%	▼14.38
NCP	Parkar Sandesh Bhaskar	11,722	17.64%	New
Margin of victory		27,310	41.09%	▲18.89
Turnout		70,588	57.10%	▼22.78
Total valid votes		66,468		
Registered electors		123,618		▼1.25
SS hold		Swing	▲4.51	

=== Assembly Election 1995 ===
1995 Maharashtra Legislative Assembly election : Malvan
Party	Candidate	Votes	%	±%
SS	Narayan Tatu Rane	56,101	57.22%	▲17.96
INC	Naik Vijay Vishnu	34,334	35.02%	▲5.01
JD	Dukhande Gopal Dattaram	6,341	6.47%	▼22.66
Independent	Karangutkar Arun Shantaram	1,010	1.03%	New
Margin of victory		21,767	22.20%	▲12.95
Turnout		99,994	79.88%	▲12.35
Total valid votes		98,042		
Registered electors		125,187		▲3.69
SS hold		Swing	▲17.96	

=== Assembly Election 1990 ===
1990 Maharashtra Legislative Assembly election : Malvan
Party	Candidate	Votes	%	±%
SS	Narayan Tatu Rane	31,466	39.26%	New
INC	Y. D. Sawant	24,051	30.01%	▼17.46
JD	S. S. Sawant	23,344	29.13%	New
Independent	Anand Govind Angane	1,016	1.27%	New
Margin of victory		7,415	9.25%	▲1.96
Turnout		81,531	67.53%	▲13.16
Total valid votes		80,146		
Registered electors		120,737		▲19.85
SS gain from INC		Swing	▼8.21	

=== Assembly Election 1985 ===
1985 Maharashtra Legislative Assembly election : Malvan
Party	Candidate	Votes	%	±%
INC	Prabhugaokar Bapusahed	25,598	47.47%	New
JP	Baban D'souza	21,665	40.18%	New
Independent	Kalsekar Vivekand Anant	3,171	5.88%	New
Independent	Appasaheb Chavan	2,331	4.32%	New
Independent	Bhai Chindarkar	791	1.47%	New
Margin of victory		3,933	7.29%	▼0.78
Turnout		54,771	54.37%	▲16.48
Total valid votes		53,920		
Registered electors		100,743		▲5.31
INC gain from INC(I)		Swing	▲6.60	

=== Assembly Election 1980 ===
1980 Maharashtra Legislative Assembly election : Malvan
Party	Candidate	Votes	%	±%
INC(I)	Keshavrao Vyankatesh Rane	14,591	40.87%	New
JP	Baban Dsouza	11,709	32.79%	New
Independent	Shyam Gangaram Kocharekar	6,987	19.57%	New
INC(U)	Mukund Hari Kadam	1,169	3.27%	New
Independent	Kaam Narhari Sakharam	682	1.91%	New
Independent	Bhai Chindarkar	566	1.59%	New
Margin of victory		2,882	8.07%	▼31.79
Turnout		36,249	37.89%	▼27.01
Total valid votes		35,704		
Registered electors		95,664		▲0.66
INC(I) gain from JP		Swing	▼18.13	

=== Assembly Election 1978 ===
1978 Maharashtra Legislative Assembly election : Malvan
Party	Candidate	Votes	%	±%
JP	Dalvi Yashwant Babaji	35,221	59.00%	New
INC	Keshavrao Vyankatesh Rane	11,429	19.15%	▼41.50
PWPI	Sawant Sitaram Sakharam	8,284	13.88%	New
Independent	Dholam Dhondi Babu	2,970	4.98%	New
Independent	Kadam Ghanashyam Tulshiram	1,160	1.94%	New
Independent	Govind Raghunath Dhuri	630	1.06%	New
Margin of victory		23,792	39.86%	▲13.36
Turnout		61,678	64.90%	▲1.60
Total valid votes		59,694		
Registered electors		95,036		▲51.03
JP gain from INC		Swing	▼1.65	

=== Assembly Election 1972 ===
1972 Maharashtra Legislative Assembly election : Malvan
Party	Candidate	Votes	%	±%
INC	Vijay Singh G. Prabhugaokar	23,386	60.65%	▲10.24
SSP	Shyam Gangaram Kocharekar	13,166	34.14%	New
Independent	Pandurang R. Chavhan	1,051	2.73%	New
ABJS	Malanakar Vithal Narayan	958	2.48%	New
Margin of victory		10,220	26.50%	▲20.27
Turnout		39,835	63.30%	▲4.56
Total valid votes		38,561		
Registered electors		62,926		▲1.94
INC hold		Swing	▲10.24	

=== Assembly Election 1967 ===
1967 Maharashtra Legislative Assembly election : Malvan
Party	Candidate	Votes	%	±%
INC	V. G. Prabhugaonkar	16,966	50.41%	▲22.05
PSP	Shyam Gangaram Kocharekar	14,868	44.18%	▼6.10
Independent	G. A. Hadkar	1,819	5.41%	New
Margin of victory		2,098	6.23%	▼15.69
Turnout		36,262	58.74%	▲7.60
Total valid votes		33,653		
Registered electors		61,729		▲1.77
INC gain from PSP		Swing	▲0.13	

=== Assembly Election 1962 ===
1962 Maharashtra Legislative Assembly election : Malvan
Party	Candidate	Votes	%	±%
PSP	Shyam Gangaram Kocharekar	14,232	50.28%	New
INC	Narayan Govindrao Prabhugaonkar	8,028	28.36%	▲15.18
PWPI	Raghunath Gopal Varadkar	2,550	9.01%	New
ABJS	Vishram Satyavan Talashilkar	1,771	6.26%	New
Independent	Mahadeo Shivram Prabhu	1,722	6.08%	New
Margin of victory		6,204	21.92%	▼51.72
Turnout		31,015	51.14%	▲6.61
Total valid votes		28,303		
Registered electors		60,653		▲3.67
PSP gain from ABJS		Swing	▼36.54	

=== Assembly Election 1957 ===
1957 Bombay State Legislative Assembly election : Malvan
Party	Candidate	Votes	%	±%
ABJS	Manjarekar Shridhar Balkrishna	22,618	86.82%	New
INC	Bhandarkar Shantabai Madhukar	3,433	13.18%	▼25.16
Margin of victory		19,185	73.64%	▲65.01
Turnout		26,051	44.53%	▲2.00
Total valid votes		26,051		
Registered electors		58,508		▲22.37
ABJS gain from INC		Swing	▲48.48	

=== Assembly Election 1952 ===
1952 Bombay State Legislative Assembly election : Malvan
Party	Candidate	Votes	%	±%
INC	Mahajan Shripad Sadashiv	7,796	38.34%	New
Independent	Manjarekar Shridhar Balkrishna	6,041	29.71%	New
Socialist	Shikhare Sakharam Raoji	5,061	24.89%	New
PWPI	Gavande Rajaram Keshav	912	4.49%	New
Independent	Hadkar Babu Bapuji	524	2.58%	New
Margin of victory		1,755	8.63%	
Turnout		20,334	42.53%	
Total valid votes		20,334		
Registered electors		47,814		
INC win (new seat)				

== See also ==
- List of constituencies of Maharashtra Legislative Assembly
