= Vinayak Raut =

Indian politician

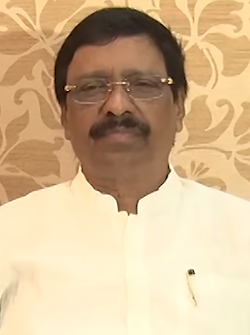

Member of Parliament, Lok Sabha
- In office 16 May 2014 – 4 June 2024
- Preceded by: Nilesh Rane
- Succeeded by: Narayan Rane
- Constituency: Ratnagiri-Sindhudurg

Member of Maharashtra Legislative Council
- In office 28 July 2012 – 16 May 2014
- Constituency: elected by Legislative Assembly members

Member of Maharashtra Legislative Assembly
- In office 7 October 1999 – 14 May 2004
- Preceded by: Gurunath Desai
- Succeeded by: Ashok Jadhav
- Constituency: Vile Parle

Personal details
- Born: 15 March 1954 (age 72) Sindhudurg, Bombay State, India
- Party: Shiv Sena (UBT)
- Spouse: Shamal Raut (m. 1984)
- Children: 2
- Parents: Bhaurao Raut (father); Rukmini Raut (mother)
- Website: vinayakraut.dudaone.com

Vinayak Raut (born 15 March 1954) is an Indian politician & former Member of Parliament, Loksabha. He is leader of Shiv Sena in Lok Sabha and he represented Ratnagiri-Sindhudurg constituency in the 17th Lok Sabha. Originally from Mumbai, Raut was previously elected as a member of the Maharashtra Legislative Assembly from Vile Parle of Mumbai for 1999-2004 as a Shiv Sena candidate. He was also elected as a member of Maharashtra Legislative Council from Shiv Sena Party in 2012. He resigned on 27 May 2014 from the Maharashtra Legislative Council. Raut was elected as MP for Ratnagiri-Sindhudurg constituency in the 2014 elections. He lost in 2024 to BJP leader Narayan Rane.

== Positions held ==
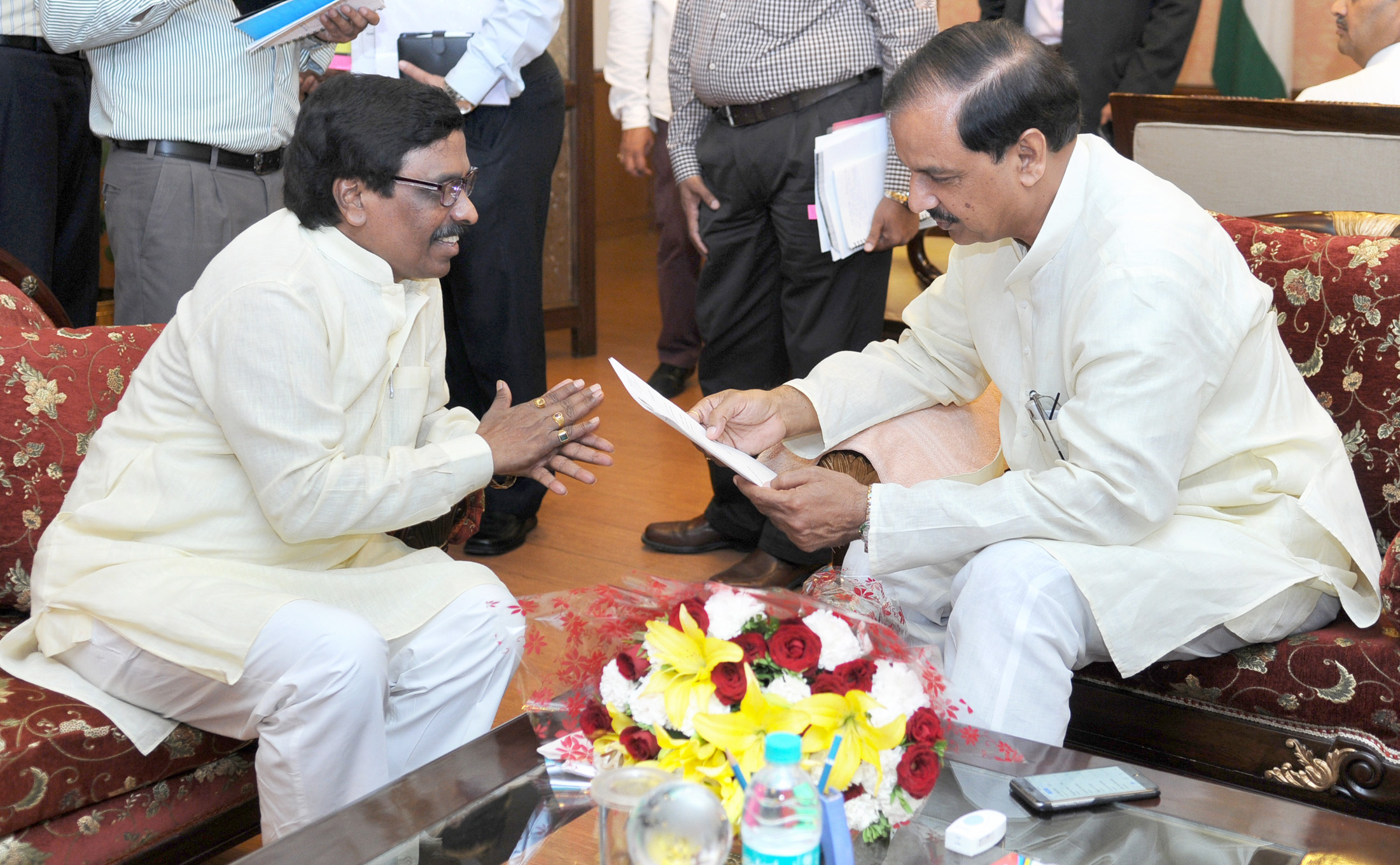
Shri Vinayak Raut, MP, Sindudurg, Ratnagiri, Maharashtra, calling on the Minister of State for Culture (Independent Charge), Tourism (Independent Charge) and Civil Aviation, Dr. Mahesh Sharma, in New Delhi on August 05, 2015

- 1985-1992: Councillor, B.M.C., Mumbai
- 1999-2004: Member, Maharashtra Legislative Assembly
- 2005: All India Party Secretary, Shiv Sena
- 2012-2014: Member, Maharashtra Legislative Council
- 2014: Elected to 16th Lok Sabha
- 2019: Elected to 17th Lok Sabha
- 2019: Leader Of Lok Sabha Shivsena

== See also ==
- Lok Sabha Members
