= Shekhar Govindrao Nikam =

Indian politician

Member of the Maharashtra Legislative Assembly
- Incumbent
- Assumed office 2019
- Preceded by: Sadanand Chavan
- Constituency: Chiplun

Personal details
- Party: Nationalist Congress Party
- Occupation: Politician

Shekhar Govindrao Nikam is a leader of Nationalist Congress Party and a member of the Maharashtra Legislative Assembly elected from Chiplun Assembly constituency in Ratnagiri city. He is the son of former Member of Parliament Govindrao Nikam, who represented Ratnagiri Loksabha Constituency from 1989 to 1996.

== Positions held ==
- 2019: Elected to Maharashtra Legislative Assembly.
- 2024: Elected to Maharashtra Legislative Assembly
