= Walope =

Village in Maharashtra

Walope is a small village in Chiplun tehsil in Ratnagiri district in the Indian state of Maharashtra. It is located on the Mumbai-Goa highway in western India. It is 3 km away from Chiplun city. It is near Chiplun railway station.

== Facilities ==
Facilities include water and electricity.
