= Nitesh Narayan Rane =

Indian politician

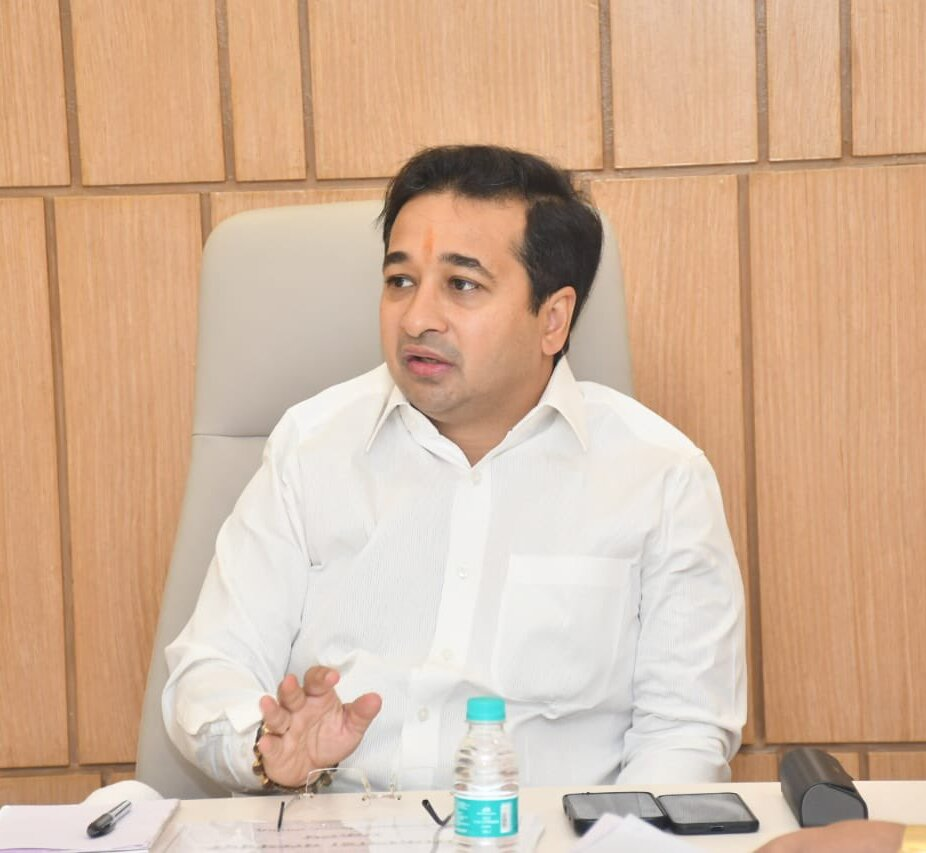
- Nitesh Rane at a cabinet meeting 2025

Minister of Ports Development Government of Maharashtra
- Incumbent
- Assumed office 15 December 2024
- Chief Minister: Devendra Fadnavis
- Guardian minister: Sindhudurg district
- Preceded by: Sanjay Bansode

Minister of Fisheries Government of Maharashtra
- Incumbent
- Assumed office 15 December 2024
- Chief Minister: Devendra Fadnavis
- Guardian minister: Sindhudurg district
- Preceded by: Sudhir Mungantiwar

Member of the Maharashtra Legislative Assembly
- Incumbent
- Assumed office 2014
- Preceded by: Pramod Jathar
- Constituency: Kankavli

Personal details
- Born: 23 June 1982 (age 44) Mumbai, Maharashtra, India
- Citizenship: India
- Party: Bharatiya Janata Party (2019-present); Indian National Congress (until 2019)
- Spouse: Rutuja Rane (m. 2007)
- Relations: Nilesh Rane (brother)
- Parent: Narayan Rane (father)
- Occupation: Politician

Nitesh Narayan Rane (born 23 June 1982) is a cabinet minister in the Government of Maharashtra and a member of Maharashtra Legislative Assembly for the Kankavli Vidhan Sabha constituency. He is the head of the non-governmental organisation "Swabhiman Sanghatana" and son of former Maharashtra chief minister Narayan Rane.

== Early life ==
Nitesh Rane was born in Bombay (now Mumbai) to Neelam Rane and Narayan Rane, a senior leader from Maharashtra on 23 June 1982. He is an MBA professional and studied in the United Kingdom along with his elder brother Nilesh. He returned to India to enter politics and help his father when his father decided to quit Shiv Sena in 2005 and join Congress.

== Personal life ==
Nitesh Rane married Rutuja Shinde on 28 November 2010. The wedding ceremony took place at the Hotel Grand Hyatt, Mumbai and the reception was held at Royal Western India Turf Club.

== Career ==
=== Swabhiman Sanghatana ===
Rane started his career by founding Swabhiman Sanghatana which raises social issues in areas of youth unemployment, health services, basic amenities throughout Maharashtra, and mainly in Mumbai. He was also the general secretary of Youth Congress, Mumbai but resigned from his post in December 2008 because of the conflict between him and other local Congress leaders. At the onset of summer of 2010, the organisation launched a toll free helpline where citizens could register their complaints against the private water supply tankers. Rane stated that the private tankers charged exorbitant prices ranging from anything between 6 and 25 times the rate set by Brihanmumbai Municipal Corporation. He blamed the Shiv Sena-BJP administered BMC for their failure to curb "water-mafia".

== Politics ==
He contested from Kankavli vidhansabha constituency in 2014 Maharashtra Legislative Assembly election and won by a margin of over 25,000 votes.

=== Other works ===
In September 2012, he co-founded Maharashtra Kalanidhi (MKN) with Anant This is wrong information theatre and cinema. The initiative also aided the production of the Marathi comedy film Duniyadari (2013).

In February 2012, he launched the Sindhudurg Tour Guide, a training program to create job opportunities for local youth in tourism in the Sindhudurg district. In February 2014, he launched Naukri Express, a mobile job office that travels across Maharashtra, connecting job seekers with local employers.

=== Controversies ===
Late in 2009, he protested the release of the Marathi film Zenda as one character in it "Sada Malwankar" resembled his father Narayan Rane, who was the then Minister of Revenue for the state. The producer-director of the film Avdhoot Gupte had to re-shoot and re-dub few scenes and also change the character's name to "Sada Panvalkar" thus removing the connection of Rane family with their hometown Malvan.

In 2010, Chintu Shaikh, a small businessman who runs a medical store in Vikhroli, filed an F.I.R. against Rane under section 307 of the Indian Penal Code for attempted murder. Shaikh claimed that Rane had fired two rounds at him. But the prima facie medical report called the injury to be sustained by some "sharp object" and not bullets. With further investigation, the Central Bureau of Investigation (CBI) gave clean chit to Rane in 2012. The case was transferred to CBI from police when Shaikh filed a petition in Bombay High Court claiming that police were wrongfully protecting Rane.

In March 2010, he launched water mafia helpline to tackle water mafia in Mumbai. He also warned the tanker association to lower their prices, and claimed that the BMC has done nothing to curb the city's water mafia. In 2011, Rane claimed that the water mafia sells water to poor people at high rates and Sena-BJP are running the water mafia. In a move against water mafia his organisation team along with him destroyed an illegal pipeline that water mafia has built in Thane from which 10 lakh litres of water was being stolen every day.

In 2012, Rane claimed that the Election Commission of India should close the stall of Vada pav run by Shiv Sena, just in the manner it had ordered covering of statues of Mayawati in Uttar Pradesh. He deemed these stalls as "promotional activity" of Shiv Sena in the light of upcoming elections of BMC. Earlier in 2011 BMC had threatened to demolish illegal stalls, including those set by Swabhiman Sanghatana. BMC had then removed Shiv Sena's stalls also after Rane warned BMC for partial behaviour.

In 2012, he was warned by BMC for displaying huge hoardings and banners on the occasion of his birthday by his followers. In response he stated that the banners were already removed by them and that BMC was targeting Nitesh Rane while turning a blind eye on banners of Shiv Sena.

On 3 December 2013, he was detained by police for allegedly damaging toll booth and assaulting workers at a toll plaza in Goa.

In 2013-14, Rane was in news for his tweets against Narendra Modi and Gujarati people inhabiting Mumbai, demanding they leave Mumbai and stated to take action against them.

In 2017, Rane was arrested for assaulting a government official by throwing fish at him.

In July 2019, Rane was arrested for assaulting a government deputy engineer.

In December 2021, he came into limelight in a controversy where he derided Aditya Thakrey with the sound of cat while protesting outside Legislative Assembly.

In December 2024, he called Kerala "mini-Pakistan". Later, he clarified that "Kerala is very much part of India" after controversy.

In 2026, the Maharashtra Maritime Board invited bids for 15 floating advertising hoardings across the Mumbai Metropolitan Region, including four along Mumbai’s coastline. Rane, the state’s ports minister, defended the proposal, while environmental activist Sumaira Abdulali warned that illuminated hoardings could affect marine biodiversity through light pollution.
