= Narayan Rane =

Indian politician

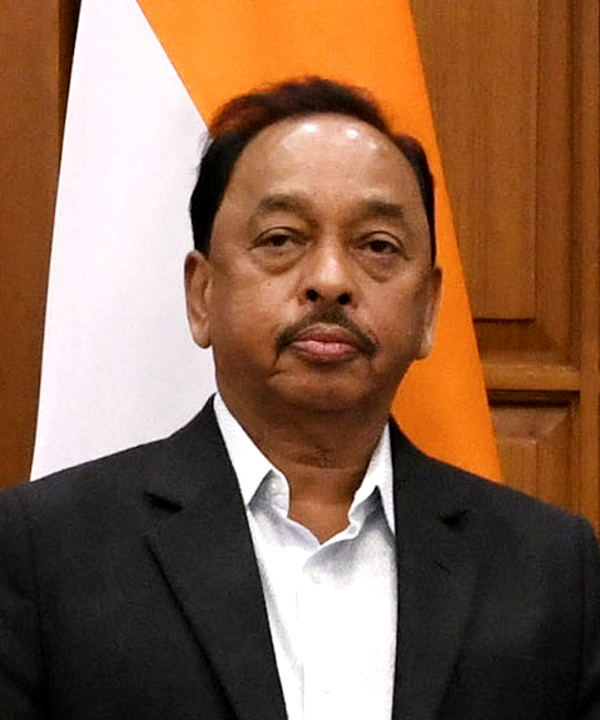
- Rane in 2021

Member of Parliament, Lok Sabha
- Incumbent
- Assumed office 4 June 2024
- Preceded by: Vinayak Raut
- Constituency: Ratnagiri–Sindhudurg, Maharashtra

Union Minister of Micro, Small and Medium Enterprises
- In office 7 July 2021 – 9 June 2024
- Prime Minister: Narendra Modi
- Preceded by: Nitin Gadkari
- Succeeded by: Jitan Ram Manjhi

Member of Parliament, Rajya Sabha
- In office 3 April 2018 – 2 April 2024
- Succeeded by: Ashok Chavan
- Constituency: Maharashtra

Member of Maharashtra Legislative Council
- In office 8 July 2016 – 21 September 2017
- Succeeded by: Prasad Lad
- Constituency: elected by MLAs

Minister of Industries of Maharashtra
- In office 19 November 2010 – 21 July 2014
- Chief Minister: Prithviraj Chavan
- Preceded by: Rajendra Darda
- Succeeded by: Prakash Mehta
- In office 19 February 2009 – 7 November 2009
- Chief Minister: Ashok Chavan

Minister of Ports of Maharashtra
- In office 19 November 2010 – 21 July 2014
- Chief Minister: Prithviraj Chavan
- Preceded by: Radhakrishna Vikhe Patil
- Succeeded by: Devendra Fadnavis

Minister of Revenue of Maharashtra
- In office 7 November 2009 – 11 November 2010
- Chief Minister: Ashok Chavan
- Preceded by: Patangrao Kadam
- Succeeded by: Balasaheb Thorat
- In office 16 August 2005 – 8 December 2008
- Chief Minister: Vilasrao Deshmukh
- Preceded by: Vilasrao Deshmukh
- Succeeded by: Patangrao Kadam
- In office 15 June 1996 – 18 October 1999
- Chief Minister: Manohar Joshi
- Preceded by: Sudhir Joshi
- Succeeded by: Ashok Chavan

Leader of the Opposition in Maharashtra Legislative Assembly
- In office 22 October 1999 – 12 July 2005
- Chief Minister: Vilasrao Deshmukh; Sushilkumar Shinde
- Preceded by: Madhukar Pichad
- Succeeded by: Ramdas Kadam

13th Chief Minister of Maharashtra
- In office 1 February 1999 – 18 October 1999
- Preceded by: Manohar Joshi
- Succeeded by: Vilasrao Deshmukh

Minister of Animal Husbandry, Dairy Development & Fisheries of Maharashtra
- In office 14 March 1995 – 15 June 1996
- Chief Minister: Manohar Joshi
- Preceded by: Madhukar Pichad
- Succeeded by: Radhakrishna Vikhe Patil

Member of Maharashtra Legislative Assembly
- In office 2009–2014
- Preceded by: Constituency established
- Succeeded by: Vaibhav Naik
- Constituency: Kudal
- In office 1990–2009
- Preceded by: Vijay Prabhugaonkar
- Succeeded by: Constituency abolished
- Constituency: Malvan

Personal details
- Born: 10 April 1952 (age 74) Bombay, Bombay State, India
- Party: Bharatiya Janata Party (2019–present)
- Other political affiliations: Maharashtra Swabhiman Paksha (2017–2019); Indian National Congress (2005–2017); Shiv Sena (1968–2005)
- Spouse: Neelam N. Rane
- Children: Nilesh; Nitesh
- Education
- Profession: Businessperson; politician

Narayan Tatu Rane (born 10 April 1952) is an Indian politician and Member of Parliament, Lok Sabha from Ratnagiri-Sindhudurg. He was a Chief Minister of Maharashtra. He formerly served as Minister of Micro, Small and Medium Enterprises in the Second Modi ministry. He has previously held Cabinet Ministry positions for Industry, Port, Employment and Self-employment, Revenue, and Industry in the Government of Maharashtra.

He was a member of Shiv Sena and opposition leader of Vidhan Sabha until July 2005, when he joined Indian National Congress party. He quit Congress in September 2017 and launched the Maharashtra Swabhiman Paksha. In 2018, he declared support for Bharatiya Janta Party (BJP) and was elected to the Rajya Sabha on a BJP nomination. On 15 October 2019, he merged his party, Maharashtra Swabhiman Paksha, into the BJP.

== Personal life ==
Narayan Rane was born to Tatu Sitaram Rane and Laxmibai Rane in Chembur, Mumbai, Maharashtra. He dropped out of 11th grade. He has two sons: Nilesh and Nitesh Rane. Nitesh is a politician and member of the Maharashtra Legislative Assembly.

== Political career ==
=== Shiv Sena ===
Rane joined Shiv Sena in his early twenties and started his political career as local Shakha Pramukh at Chembur, Mumbai. He then became the Councillor of Kopargaon. Under the BJP-Shiv Sena coalition government, Rane first received the Revenue Ministry portfolio. He succeeded Manohar Joshi as Chief Minister in 1999, when Joshi was forced to resign due to a land use controversy. Later that year, the BJP-Sena alliance led by Rane lost the October 1999 Maharashtra elections to an INC-NCP coalition. The election campaign opened a breach between Rane and Uddhav Thackeray, the president of Shiv Sena. Relations between Thackeray and Rane finally ruptured completely in 2005, when Rane submitted his resignation from the party. In response Thackeray expelled Rane from the party on 3 July 2005, accusing Rane of "gangsterism" and "betrayal of the party."

=== Indian National Congress ===
Rane joined the Indian National Congress in 2005, receiving his old post as Revenue Minister under the Second Deshmukh Ministry. In a 2005 by-election, he won re-election from his old Malvan seat in the Konkan region on a Congress ticket. In the wake of 2008 Mumbai attacks, Vilasrao Deshmukh, then Chief Minister of Maharashtra resigned, and Sonia Gandhi elevated Ashok Chavan as Chief Minister. Rane accused the Congress leadership of breaching its promises to make him Chief Minister and was suspended by the party. After Rane apologized, the INC revoked his suspension. Prithviraj Chavan appointed Rane as Minister of Industry in his first ministry, elevating Balasheb Thorat to Rane's old Revenue portfolio. Rane resigned from the Cabinet in July 2014 over differences with the party's leadership on the INC's campaign effort. The BJP and SHS went on to claim victory in the 2014 Maharashtra Legislative Assembly election, in which Rane lost his bid for re-election to a Shiv Sena candidate.

In 2016, the INC appointed Rane as a member of the Maharashtra Legislative Council. However, the appointment did not suppress the increasingly public feud between Rane and the Congress leadership,, prompting speculation about Rane's future in the party. On 21 September 2017, Rane resigned both from the INC and from his membership on the Maharashtra Legislative Council.

=== Maharashtra Swabhiman Paksha ===
Though press at the time expected Rane's resignation to result in an appointment to Devendra Fadnavis's cabinet, Shiv Sena, still led by Rane's longtime rival Uddhav Thackeray, threatened to withdraw from the BJP-led coalition if Rane was admitted. Temporarily without a party, Rane formed a new political party in October 2017 called the Maharashtra Swabhiman Paksha and indicated that it would ally with Bharatiya Janata Party. However, when Rane ran for Rajya Sabha in 2018, he did so under a BJP party line.

=== Bharatiya Janata Party ===
Narayan Rane merged his party, Maharashtra Swabhiman Paksha, with the Bharatiya Janata Party on October 15, 2019. Following that year's legislative assembly elections in Maharashtra, the BJP-Sena alliance broke down completely. During the July 2021 Cabinet reshuffle, Prime Minister Shri Narendra Modi elevated Rane to Minister of Micro, Small and Medium Enterprises. Political writer Aditi Phadnis interpreted this as a BJP attempt to make inroads in the Marathi strongholds of their former allies, Shiv Sena. In 2024 he was elected as a Member of Parliament, Lok Sabha from Ratnagiri-Sindhudurg Lok Sabha as a BJP candidate.

== Newspaper Prahaar ==
Rane launched the Marathi daily Prahaar on 8 October 2008, under the ownership of Rane Prakashan Pvt. Ltd. While he serves as the Consulting Editor, journalist Madhukar Bhave is the editor of the newspaper.

== Controversies ==
In August 2011, Urban Development Deputy Secretary BK Gahart claimed in a deposition before the inquiry committee investigating the Adarsh Housing Society scam that while Rane was Chief Minister in the 1999 Shiv Sena-BJP ministry, he expedited a land allocation at the behest of Adarsh Housing Society. The BJP-Sena opposition unsuccessfully campaigned for Rane's resignation as Industry Minister, but when the inquiry committee completed its report in April 2013, indicting four former Chief Ministers of Maharashtra, Rane was not included.

In August 2021, while traveling under the BJP Jan Ashirwad Yatra initiative (a program under which Modi ministers traveled to their home constituencies and regions), Rane claimed Uddhav Thackeray, the Chief Minister of Maharashtra following the 2019 Maharashtra political crisis, forgot the year of India's independence during an Independence Day speech, requiring prompting by an aide. Rane went on to declare that, "Had I been there, I would have given him a slap." Maharashtra Police arrested Rane in Ratnagiri on 24 August. A court conditionally granted him bail the following day.

In February 2022, an F.I.R. was registered against Rane for allegedly making defamatory and false statements about Disha Salian's death.

The Bombay High Court declined to grant interim relief to Union Minister Narayan Rane in a plea seeking protection from arrest concerning his controversial remarks about then-Chief Minister Uddhav Thackeray. Rane's petition, filed through his counsel Aniket Nikam, sought to quash multiple First Information Reports (FIRs) registered against him across Maharashtra. The court refused an urgent hearing on the matter, leading Rane's legal team to withdraw the plea with the liberty to approach a vacation bench.

== See also ==
- Narayan Rane ministry
- List of chief ministers of Maharashtra
- Shiv Sena

Preceded by Sudhir Joshi	Minister of Revenue; 15 June 1996 – 1 February 1999	Succeeded by Diwakar Raote
Preceded by Manohar Joshi	Chief Minister of Maharashtra; 1 February 1999 – 17 October 1999	Succeeded by Vilasrao Deshmukh
Preceded by Vilasrao Deshmukh	Minister of Revenue; 16 August 2005 – 6 December 2008	Succeeded by Patangrao Kadam
Preceded by Ashok Chavan	Minister of Industry; 20 February 2009 – 9 November 2009	Succeeded by Rajendra Darda
Preceded by Patangrao Kadam	Minister of Revenue; 9 November 2009 – 19 November 2010	Succeeded by Balasaheb Thorat
Preceded by Rajendra Darda	Minister of Industry, Port and Employment; 20 November 2010 – October 2014	Succeeded by Subhash Desai
Preceded by Nitin Gadkari	Minister of Micro, Small and Medium Enterprises; 7 July 2021 – 9 June 2024	Succeeded by Jitan Ram Manjhi
