= Kiran Samant =

Indian politician

Member of the Maharashtra Legislative Assembly
- Incumbent
- Assumed office 2024
- Constituency: Rajapur Assembly constituency

Personal details
- Born: 1973 (age 52–53) Ratnagiri, Maharashtra, India
- Party: Shiv Sena
- Parent: Ravindra Dwarkanath Samant (father)
- Relatives: Uday Samant (brother)
- Education: Board of Technical Examination, Bangalore
- Profession: Politician, Civil Engineer, Builder

Kiran Samant (born 1973), alias Bhaiyya Samant, is an Indian politician from Maharashtra. He is a member of the Maharashtra Legislative Assembly from Rajapur Assembly constituency in Ratnagiri district. He won the 2024 Maharashtra Legislative Assembly election representing Shiv Sena.

== Early life and education ==
Samant was born and raised in Ratnagiri, Maharashtra. He is the son of Ravindra Dwarkanath Samant and the brother of state minister Uday Samant. He studied for a diploma in civil engineering and passed the technical examinations conducted by the Board of Technical Examination, Bangalore in 1992. He is a builder and runs his own business.

== Career ==
Samant won from the Rajapur Assembly constituency representing Shiv Sena in the 2024 Maharashtra Legislative Assembly election. He polled 80,256 votes and defeated his nearest rival, Rajan Prabhakar Salvi of Shiva Sena (UBT), by a margin of 19,677 votes.
