= Maharashtra Swabhiman Paksha =

- Abbreviation: MSP
- Leader: Narayan Rane
- President: Narayan Rane
- Founder: Narayan Rane
- Founded: 17 October 2017 (8 years ago)
- Dissolved: 15 October 2019 (6 years ago)
- Merged into: Bharatiya Janata Party
- Colours: Orange
- Alliance: National Democratic Alliance (2018-2019)

Election symbol
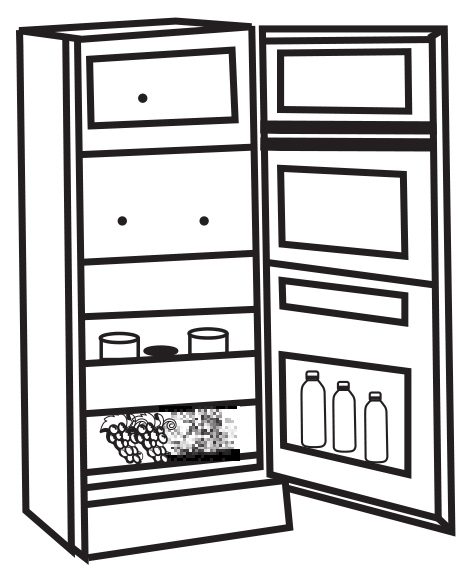

Maharashtra Swabhiman Paksha was founded by Narayan Rane on 17 October 2018. The party was indicated to ally with Bharatiya Janata Party. It was registered in the ECI in December 2018

In 2018, he declared support for Bharatiya Janata Party, and was elected to the Rajya Sabha on a BJP nomination.

== Merger with BJP ==
Maharashtra Swabhiman Paksha led by Narayan Rane merged with the Bharatiya Janata Party on 15 October 2019, at Kankavli in presence of Maharasthra Chief Minister Devendra Fadnavis.

== Electoral performance ==
=== Lok Sabha elections ===
Lok Sabha Term	Indian General Election	Seats contested	Seats won	Votes Polled	% of votes	% of votes in seats contested	State (seats)	Reference
17th Lok Sabha	2019	1	0	2,79,700	31.04	0		
