= Kankavli Assembly constituency =

Constituency of the Maharashtra legislative assembly in India

Kankavli
- Constituency No. 268 for the Maharashtra Legislative Assembly

Constituency details
- Country: India
- Region: Western India
- State: Maharashtra
- District: Sindhudurg
- Lok Sabha constituency: Ratnagiri-Sindhudurg
- Established: 1952
- Total electors: 231,788
- Reservation: None

Member of Legislative Assembly
- 15th Maharashtra Legislative Assembly
- Incumbent Nitesh Narayan Rane
- Party: BJP
- Alliance: NDA

Kankavli-Vaibhavwadi-Devgad Assembly constituency is one of the 288 Vidhan Sabha (Legislative Assembly) constituencies of Maharashtra state in Western India. The constituency is located in the Sindhudurg district.

It is a part of the Ratnagiri-Sindhudurg Lok Sabha constituency, along with five other Vidhan Sabha segments, namely Kudal and Sawantwadi from the Sindhudurg district and Chiplun Sangameshwar, Ratnagiri and Rajapur from the Ratnagiri district.

== Members of the Legislative Assembly ==
| Election | Member | Party |
|---|---|---|
| 1952 | Rane Keshav Vyankatesh | Indian National Congress |
| 1957 | Sawant Bhaskar Balkrishna | Peasants and Workers Party of India |
| 1962 | Yeshwant Babaji Dalvi | Praja Socialist Party |
| 1967 | S. S. Sawant | Peasants and Workers Party of India |
| 1972 | K. Vyankateshrao Rane | Indian National Congress |
| 2009 | Jathar Pramod Shantaram | Bharatiya Janata Party |
| 2014 | Nitesh Narayan Rane | Indian National Congress |
| 2019 | Nitesh Narayan Rane | Bharatiya Janata Party |
| 2024 | Nitesh Narayan Rane | Bharatiya Janata Party |

== Election results ==
=== Assembly Election 2024 ===
2024 Maharashtra Legislative Assembly election : Kankavli
| Party | Candidate | Votes | % | ±% |
|---|---|---|---|---|
| BJP | Nitesh Narayan Rane | 108,369 | 66.85% | ▲9.95 |
| SS(UBT) | Sandesh Bhaskar Parkar | 50,362 | 31.07% | New |
| Independent | Ganesh Arvind Mane | 1,144 | 0.71% | New |
| NOTA | None of the above | 1,011 | 0.62% | ▼0.69 |
| Margin of victory | | 58,007 | 35.78% | ▲16.85 |
| Turnout | | 163,129 | 70.38% | ▲4.90 |
| Total valid votes | | 162,118 | | |
| Registered electors | | 231,788 | | ▲0.74 |
| BJP hold | | Swing | ▲9.95 | |

=== Assembly Election 2019 ===
2019 Maharashtra Legislative Assembly election : Kankavli
| Party | Candidate | Votes | % | ±% |
|---|---|---|---|---|
| BJP | Nitesh Narayan Rane | 84,504 | 56.90% | ▲25.37 |
| SS | Satish Jagannath Sawant | 56,388 | 37.97% | ▲29.65 |
| INC | Sushil Amrutrao Rane | 3,355 | 2.26% | ▼46.07 |
| VBA | Adv. Manali Sandeep Vanjare | 2,054 | 1.38% | New |
| NOTA | None of the above | 1,945 | 1.31% | ▲0.42 |
| MNS | Rajan Shankar Dabholkar | 1,421 | 0.96% | New |
| Margin of victory | | 28,116 | 18.93% | ▲2.12 |
| Turnout | | 150,660 | 65.48% | ▼4.12 |
| Total valid votes | | 148,516 | | |
| Registered electors | | 230,081 | | ▲2.68 |
| BJP gain from INC | | Swing | ▲8.57 | |

=== Assembly Election 2014 ===
2014 Maharashtra Legislative Assembly election : Kankavli
| Party | Candidate | Votes | % | ±% |
|---|---|---|---|---|
| INC | Nitesh Narayan Rane | 74,715 | 48.33% | ▲8.45 |
| BJP | Jathar Pramod Shantaram | 48,736 | 31.53% | ▼8.37 |
| SS | Subhash Mayekar | 12,863 | 8.32% | New |
| NCP | Atul Suresh Raorane | 8,196 | 5.30% | New |
| Independent | Vijay Krishnaji Sawant | 7,215 | 4.67% | New |
| NOTA | None of the above | 1,381 | 0.89% | New |
| PWPI | Dr. Tulshiram Vasudeo Raorane | 1,326 | 0.86% | New |
| Margin of victory | | 25,979 | 16.81% | ▲16.79 |
| Turnout | | 155,962 | 69.60% | ▼1.11 |
| Total valid votes | | 154,578 | | |
| Registered electors | | 224,081 | | ▲9.64 |
| INC gain from BJP | | Swing | ▲8.43 | |

=== Assembly Election 2009 ===
2009 Maharashtra Legislative Assembly election : Kankavli
| Party | Candidate | Votes | % | ±% |
|---|---|---|---|---|
| BJP | Jathar Pramod Shantaram | 57,651 | 39.90% | New |
| INC | Ravindra Sadanand Phatak | 57,617 | 39.88% | ▼26.54 |
| JSS | Kuldeep Pednekar | 24,566 | 17.00% | New |
| Independent | Prin. Mahendra Natekar | 2,935 | 2.03% | New |
| BSP | Vasudev Sitaram Jadhav | 1,717 | 1.19% | New |
| Margin of victory | | 34 | 0.02% | ▼34.97 |
| Turnout | | 144,515 | 70.71% | ▲8.94 |
| Total valid votes | | 144,486 | | |
| Registered electors | | 204,374 | | ▲186.54 |
| BJP gain from INC | | Swing | ▼26.52 | |

=== Assembly Election 1972 ===
1972 Maharashtra Legislative Assembly election : Kankavli
| Party | Candidate | Votes | % | ±% |
|---|---|---|---|---|
| INC | K. Vyankateshrao Rane | 28,268 | 66.42% | ▲31.69 |
| PWPI | Sitaram Sakharam Sawant | 13,376 | 31.43% | ▼7.52 |
| INC(O) | Hari Baburao Aglave | 918 | 2.16% | New |
| Margin of victory | | 14,892 | 34.99% | ▲30.78 |
| Turnout | | 44,059 | 61.77% | ▲8.53 |
| Total valid votes | | 42,562 | | |
| Registered electors | | 71,325 | | ▲5.02 |
| INC gain from PWPI | | Swing | ▲27.47 | |

=== Assembly Election 1967 ===
1967 Maharashtra Legislative Assembly election : Kankavli
| Party | Candidate | Votes | % | ±% |
|---|---|---|---|---|
| PWPI | S. S. Sawant | 12,826 | 38.95% | ▲19.89 |
| INC | Bhaskar Balkrishna Sawant | 11,438 | 34.73% | ▲0.72 |
| PSP | B. R. Hatle | 8,668 | 26.32% | ▼13.00 |
| Margin of victory | | 1,388 | 4.21% | ▼1.10 |
| Turnout | | 36,155 | 53.24% | ▲10.93 |
| Total valid votes | | 32,932 | | |
| Registered electors | | 67,914 | | ▲2.53 |
| PWPI gain from PSP | | Swing | ▼0.37 | |

=== Assembly Election 1962 ===
1962 Maharashtra Legislative Assembly election : Kankavli
| Party | Candidate | Votes | % | ±% |
|---|---|---|---|---|
| PSP | Yeshwant Babaji Dalvi | 10,035 | 39.32% | New |
| INC | Bhaskar Balkrishna Sawant | 8,679 | 34.01% | ▲15.58 |
| PWPI | Sitaram Sakharam Sawant | 4,864 | 19.06% | ▼62.51 |
| ABJS | Gajanan Atmaram Pitre | 1,113 | 4.36% | New |
| Independent | Sakharam Govind Tawate | 830 | 3.25% | New |
| Margin of victory | | 1,356 | 5.31% | ▼57.84 |
| Turnout | | 28,023 | 42.31% | ▼3.43 |
| Total valid votes | | 25,521 | | |
| Registered electors | | 66,240 | | ▲8.63 |
| PSP gain from PWPI | | Swing | ▼42.25 | |

=== Assembly Election 1957 ===
1957 Bombay State Legislative Assembly election : Kankavli
| Party | Candidate | Votes | % | ±% |
|---|---|---|---|---|
| PWPI | Sawant Bhaskar Balkrishna | 22,750 | 81.57% | ▲55.92 |
| INC | Rane Keshav Vyankatesh | 5,139 | 18.43% | ▼19.65 |
| Margin of victory | | 17,611 | 63.15% | ▲51.37 |
| Turnout | | 27,889 | 45.74% | ▲11.43 |
| Total valid votes | | 27,889 | | |
| Registered electors | | 60,977 | | ▲9.93 |
| PWPI gain from INC | | Swing | ▲43.49 | |

=== Assembly Election 1952 ===
1952 Bombay State Legislative Assembly election : Kankavli
| Party | Candidate | Votes | % | ±% |
|---|---|---|---|---|
| INC | Rane Keshav Vyankatesh | 7,246 | 38.08% | New |
| Socialist | Gholkar Shankar Shripad | 5,004 | 26.30% | New |
| PWPI | Tawade Jagannath Ramkrishna | 4,880 | 25.65% | New |
| Independent | Shetye Purushottam Anant | 1,899 | 9.98% | New |
| Margin of victory | | 2,242 | 11.78% | |
| Turnout | | 19,029 | 34.31% | |
| Total valid votes | | 19,029 | | |
| Registered electors | | 55,469 | | |
| INC win (new seat) | | | | |

== See also ==
- Kankavli
- List of constituencies of Maharashtra Vidhan Sabha
