= Ratnagiri Assembly constituency =

Constituency of the Maharashtra legislative assembly in India

Coordinates: 16.99°N 73.32°E

Ratnagiri
- Constituency No. 266 for the Maharashtra Legislative Assembly

Constituency details
- Country: India
- Region: Western India
- State: Maharashtra
- District: Ratnagiri
- Lok Sabha constituency: Ratnagiri-Sindhudurg
- Established: 1952
- Total electors: 291,263
- Reservation: None

Member of Legislative Assembly
- 15th Maharashtra Legislative Assembly
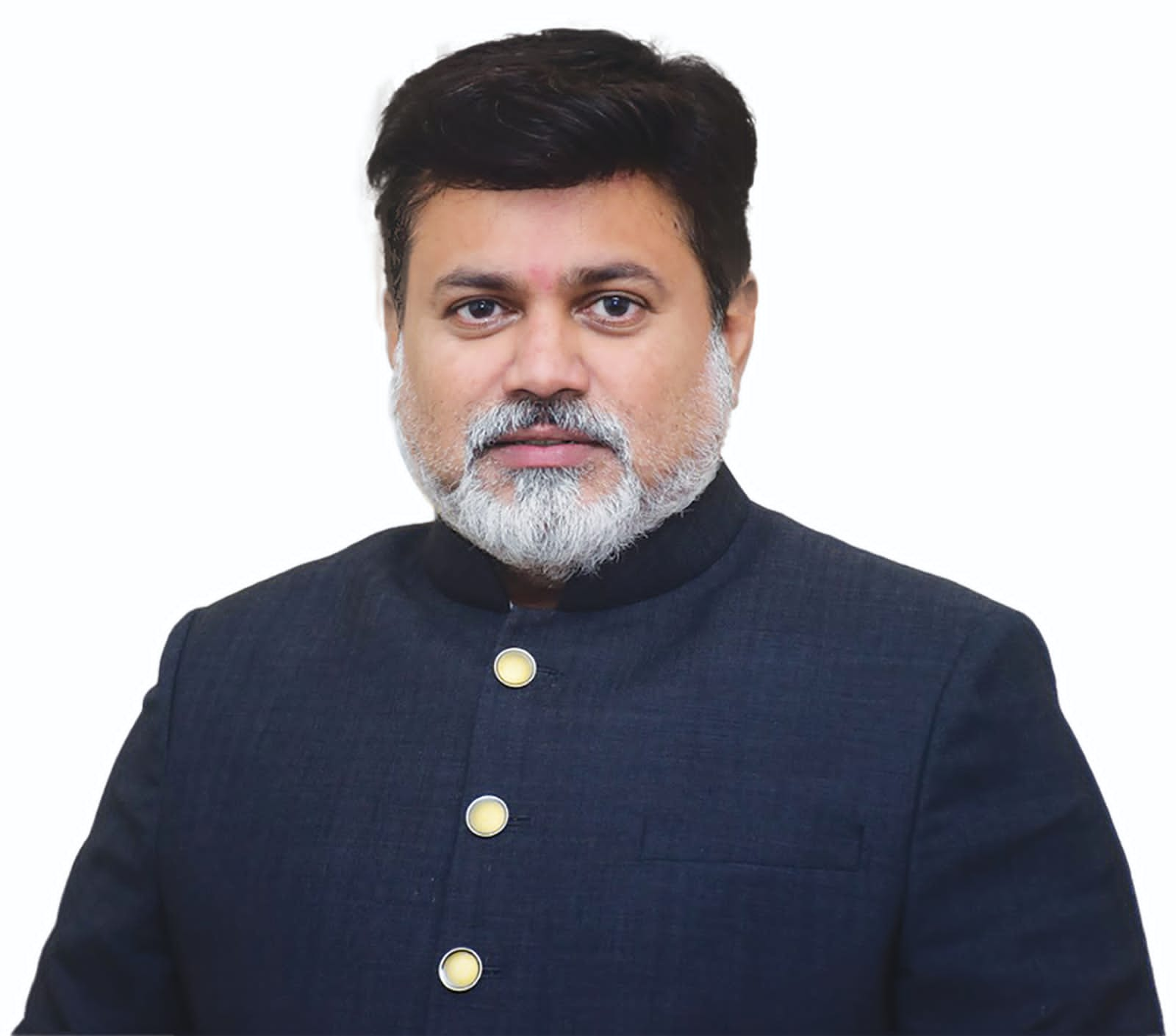
- Incumbent Uday Samant
- Party: SHS
- Alliance: NDA
- Elected year: 2024

Ratnagiri Assembly constituency is one of the 288 Vidhan Sabha (Assembly) constituencies of Maharashtra state in Western India. It is one of the 6 assembly seats under Ratnagiri-Sindhudurg Lok Sabha constituency. It consists only Ratnagiri Taluka.

== Members of the Legislative Assembly ==
Election	Member	Party
1952	Surwe Sitaram Nana	Indian National Congress
1957	Modak Atmaram Vasudeo	Praja Socialist Party
1962	Shantaram Laxman Peje	Indian National Congress
1967	Shantaram Laxman Peje	Indian National Congress
1972	Hassnain. S. E	Indian National Congress
1978	Abhyankar Kusum Ramchandra	Janata Party
1980	Abhyankar Kusum Ramchandra	Bharatiya Janata Party
1984 By-election	Gotad Shivajirao Ramchandra	Bharatiya Janata Party
1985	Shivajirao Jadyar	Indian National Congress
1990	Gotad Shivajirao Ramchandra	Bharatiya Janata Party
1995	Gotad Shivajirao Ramchandra	Bharatiya Janata Party
1999	Balasaheb Mane	Bharatiya Janata Party
2004	Uday Ravindra Samant	Nationalist Congress Party
2009	Uday Ravindra Samant	Nationalist Congress Party
2014	Uday Ravindra Samant	Shiv Sena
2019	Uday Ravindra Samant	Shiv Sena
2024	Uday Ravindra Samant	Shiv Sena

== Election results ==
=== Assembly Election 2024 ===
2024 Maharashtra Legislative Assembly election : Ratnagiri
Party	Candidate	Votes	%	±%
SS	Uday Ravindra Samant	111,335	60.33%	▼14.42
SS(UBT)	Balasaheb Mane	69,745	37.80%	New
NOTA	None of the above	3,073	1.67%	▼1.20
Margin of victory		41,590	22.54%	▼32.56
Turnout		187,602	64.41%	▲6.55
Total valid votes		184,529		
Registered electors		291,263		▲3.29
SS hold		Swing	▼14.42	

=== Assembly Election 2019 ===
2019 Maharashtra Legislative Assembly election : Ratnagiri
Party	Candidate	Votes	%	±%
SS	Uday Ravindra Samant	118,484	74.75%	▲20.44
NCP	Sudesh Sadanand Mayekar	31,149	19.65%	▲11.44
VBA	Damodar Shivram Kamble	4,621	2.92%	New
NOTA	None of the above	4,552	2.87%	▲1.30
Independent	Gawade Sandeep Yashavant	2,035	1.28%	New
BSP	Jadhav Rajesh Sitaram	1,707	1.08%	▲0.25
Margin of victory		87,335	55.10%	▲32.29
Turnout		163,146	57.86%	▼8.36
Total valid votes		158,514		
Registered electors		281,973		▲6.29
SS hold		Swing	▲20.44	

=== Assembly Election 2014 ===
2014 Maharashtra Legislative Assembly election : Ratnagiri
Party	Candidate	Votes	%	±%
SS	Uday Ravindra Samant	93,876	54.31%	New
BJP	Balasaheb Mane	54,449	31.50%	▼9.84
NCP	Bashir Amin Murtuza	14,195	8.21%	▼38.32
INC	Keer Ramesh Shreedhar	5,057	2.93%	New
NOTA	None of the above	2,722	1.57%	New
Independent	Mohite Nandkumar Dhondu	1,653	0.96%	New
BSP	Dinesh Govind Pawar	1,432	0.83%	▼0.15
Margin of victory		39,427	22.81%	▲17.62
Turnout		175,670	66.22%	▼1.03
Total valid votes		172,866		
Registered electors		265,279		▲11.81
SS gain from NCP		Swing	▲7.78	

=== Assembly Election 2009 ===
2009 Maharashtra Legislative Assembly election : Ratnagiri
Party	Candidate	Votes	%	±%
NCP	Uday Ravindra Samant	74,245	46.53%	▼0.42
BJP	Balasaheb Mane	65,969	41.34%	▼1.12
MNS	Ghag Sanket Ketan	5,617	3.52%	New
Independent	Surve Sunil Vasantrao	3,563	2.23%	New
Independent	Nana Mayekar	3,219	2.02%	New
Lok Bharati	Abhijit Hegshetye	1,658	1.04%	New
Independent	Shabab Noormohammad Khan	1,579	0.99%	New
BSP	Nisar Hasan Rajapurkar	1,565	0.98%	▼0.48
Margin of victory		8,276	5.19%	▲0.70
Turnout		159,563	67.25%	▲1.49
Total valid votes		159,562		
Registered electors		237,258		▲15.79
NCP hold		Swing	▼0.42	

=== Assembly Election 2004 ===
2004 Maharashtra Legislative Assembly election : Ratnagiri
Party	Candidate	Votes	%	±%
NCP	Uday Ravindra Samant	63,233	46.95%	▲12.55
BJP	Balasaheb Mane	57,188	42.46%	▼5.30
Independent	Mohite Nanadkumar Dhondu	5,968	4.43%	New
Independent	T. G. Sawant	3,398	2.52%	New
BSP	Ghag Rajaram Gopal	1,967	1.46%	New
ABHM	Shankar Nilkanth Bagwe	1,156	0.86%	New
Independent	Govind Rama Bane	1,093	0.81%	New
Margin of victory		6,045	4.49%	▼8.88
Turnout		134,736	65.76%	▲11.77
Total valid votes		134,695		
Registered electors		204,902		▲11.05
NCP gain from BJP		Swing	▼0.81	

=== Assembly Election 1999 ===
1999 Maharashtra Legislative Assembly election : Ratnagiri
Party	Candidate	Votes	%	±%
BJP	Balasaheb Mane	44,000	47.76%	▲0.85
NCP	Kumar Shetye	31,687	34.40%	New
INC	Keer Ramesh Shridhar	10,579	11.48%	▼11.44
Independent	Salim Vijay Laxman	4,568	4.96%	New
Independent	Abdul Bijlee Khan	921	1.00%	New
Margin of victory		12,313	13.37%	▼8.84
Turnout		99,622	53.99%	▼17.04
Total valid votes		92,123		
Registered electors		184,513		▲5.22
BJP hold		Swing	▲0.85	

=== Assembly Election 1995 ===
1995 Maharashtra Legislative Assembly election : Ratnagiri
Party	Candidate	Votes	%	±%
BJP	Gotad Shivajirao Ramchandra	56,710	46.91%	▲3.10
Independent	Suhas Waman Alias Kumar Shetye	29,860	24.70%	New
INC	Ravindra Ramkrishna Surve	27,702	22.92%	▼11.99
Independent	Sunil Vasantrao Surve	2,824	2.34%	New
Samajwadi Janata Party (Maharashtra)	Pangale Dhondu Mahadeo	1,962	1.62%	New
BSP	Dingankar Vidyadher Ravikant	1,827	1.51%	▲0.71
Margin of victory		26,850	22.21%	▲13.30
Turnout		124,546	71.03%	▲10.57
Total valid votes		120,885		
Registered electors		175,354		▲14.02
BJP hold		Swing	▲3.10	

=== Assembly Election 1990 ===
1990 Maharashtra Legislative Assembly election : Ratnagiri
Party	Candidate	Votes	%	±%
BJP	Gotad Shivajirao Ramchandra	39,823	43.81%	▲12.18
INC	Shivajirao Jadyar	31,729	34.91%	▼15.24
Independent	Pramod Salvi	17,709	19.48%	New
BSP	Dhondu Mahadeo Pangale	728	0.80%	New
Margin of victory		8,094	8.91%	▼9.60
Turnout		92,986	60.46%	▲8.66
Total valid votes		90,889		
Registered electors		153,786		▲27.61
BJP gain from INC		Swing	▼6.34	

=== Assembly Election 1985 ===
1985 Maharashtra Legislative Assembly election : Ratnagiri
Party	Candidate	Votes	%	±%
INC	Shivajirao Jadyar	30,518	50.15%	▲6.30
BJP	Gotad Shivajirao Ramchandra	19,252	31.63%	▼17.23
Independent	Bashir Amin Murtuza	4,306	7.08%	New
RPI	Pawar Bhikajirao	2,497	4.10%	New
Independent	Vijay Dattatray Salvi	2,256	3.71%	New
Independent	Govind Vasudeo Orpe	1,054	1.73%	New
Independent	Namdevrao Sutar	558	0.92%	New
Independent	Mayekar Vinayak Anna	416	0.68%	New
Margin of victory		11,266	18.51%	▲13.50
Turnout		62,429	51.80%	
Total valid votes		60,857		
Registered electors		120,511		
INC gain from BJP		Swing	▲1.29	

=== Assembly By-election 1984 ===
1984 Maharashtra Legislative Assembly by-election : Ratnagiri
Party	Candidate	Votes	%	±%
BJP	Gotad Shivajirao Ramchandra	23,777	48.86%	▲14.60
INC	S. G. Sitaram	21,340	43.85%	New
Independent	B. Y. Padmakar	1,600	3.29%	New
Independent	N. S. Shankar	849	1.74%	New
Independent	S. V. Dattatray	666	1.37%	New
Independent	T. R. Bhimrao	432	0.89%	New
Margin of victory		2,437	5.01%	▲3.98
Total valid votes		48,664		
BJP hold		Swing	▲14.60	

=== Assembly Election 1980 ===
1980 Maharashtra Legislative Assembly election : Ratnagiri
Party	Candidate	Votes	%	±%
BJP	Abhyankar Kusum Ramchandra	16,996	34.26%	New
INC(I)	Jadyar Shivajirao Tulaji	16,483	33.23%	New
Independent	Hassnain. S. E	6,363	12.83%	New
JP	Surve Dadasaheb Sitaram	4,822	9.72%	New
RPI	Bhikajirao Pawar	2,785	5.61%	New
Independent	Joshi Shashikant Gangadhar	1,638	3.30%	New
Independent	Sawant Prabhakar Govindrao	519	1.05%	New
Margin of victory		513	1.03%	▼14.45
Turnout		51,044	46.06%	▼17.26
Total valid votes		49,606		
Registered electors		110,810		▲3.50
BJP gain from JP		Swing	▼11.91	

=== Assembly Election 1978 ===
1978 Maharashtra Legislative Assembly election : Ratnagiri
Party	Candidate	Votes	%	±%
JP	Abhyankar Kusum Ramchandra	29,901	46.17%	New
INC	Paje Shantaram Laxman	19,876	30.69%	▼21.65
Independent	Hassnain. S. E	11,311	17.47%	New
Independent	Salavi Vijay Dattaray	3,671	5.67%	New
Margin of victory		10,025	15.48%	▼5.45
Turnout		67,794	63.32%	▲8.67
Total valid votes		64,759		
Registered electors		107,058		▲31.55
JP gain from INC		Swing	▼6.17	

=== Assembly Election 1972 ===
1972 Maharashtra Legislative Assembly election : Ratnagiri
Party	Candidate	Votes	%	±%
INC	Hassnain. S. E	22,325	52.34%	▼2.81
ABJS	Niwendkar V. Krishnaji	13,395	31.40%	▼2.64
Independent	Bhatkar Nuruddin Daood	4,953	11.61%	New
RPI(K)	Gangaram Bhikaji Kambale	1,983	4.65%	New
Margin of victory		8,930	20.93%	▼0.18
Turnout		44,472	54.65%	▼5.57
Total valid votes		42,656		
Registered electors		81,382		▲12.96
INC hold		Swing	▼2.81	

=== Assembly Election 1967 ===
1967 Maharashtra Legislative Assembly election : Ratnagiri
Party	Candidate	Votes	%	±%
INC	Shantaram Laxman Peje	22,108	55.15%	▲2.50
ABJS	V. K. Nivendkar	13,646	34.04%	New
RPI	G. B. Kamble	4,336	10.82%	New
Margin of victory		8,462	21.11%	▼9.99
Turnout		43,387	60.22%	▲7.37
Total valid votes		40,090		
Registered electors		72,044		▲8.40
INC hold		Swing	▲2.50	

=== Assembly Election 1962 ===
1962 Maharashtra Legislative Assembly election : Ratnagiri
Party	Candidate	Votes	%	±%
INC	Shantaram Laxman Peje	16,804	52.65%	▲25.23
PSP	Mohan Shankar Todankar	6,878	21.55%	▼51.03
ABJS	Dattatray Yashwant Vilankar	5,126	16.06%	New
ABHM	Shankar Ramchandra Date	3,109	9.74%	New
Margin of victory		9,926	31.10%	▼14.05
Turnout		35,124	52.85%	▼3.14
Total valid votes		31,917		
Registered electors		66,461		▲13.07
INC gain from PSP		Swing	▼19.93	

=== Assembly Election 1957 ===
1957 Bombay State Legislative Assembly election : Ratnagiri
Party	Candidate	Votes	%	±%
PSP	Modak Atmaram Vasudeo	23,887	72.58%	New
INC	Surwe Sitaram Nana	9,026	27.42%	▼23.44
Margin of victory		14,861	45.15%	▲20.49
Turnout		32,913	55.99%	▲14.43
Total valid votes		32,913		
Registered electors		58,779		▲16.14
PSP gain from INC		Swing	▲21.72	

=== Assembly Election 1952 ===
1952 Bombay State Legislative Assembly election : Ratnagiri
Party	Candidate	Votes	%	±%
INC	Surwe Sitaram Nana	10,699	50.86%	New
Socialist	Shetye Jairam Balkirshna Alias Bhai	5,512	26.20%	New
Independent	Desai Baburao Bhawana	3,488	16.58%	New
PWPI	Pathare Narayan Hari	1,336	6.35%	New
Margin of victory		5,187	24.66%	
Turnout		21,035	41.56%	
Total valid votes		21,035		
Registered electors		50,611		
INC win (new seat)				
