= Kudal Assembly constituency =

Constituency of the Maharashtra legislative assembly in India

Coordinates: 15°59′50.02″N 73°39′32.92″E

Kudal
- Constituency No. 269 for the Maharashtra Legislative Assembly

Constituency details
- Country: India
- Region: Western India
- State: Maharashtra
- District: Sindhudurg
- Lok Sabha constituency: Ratnagiri-Sindhudurg
- Established: 2008
- Total electors: 217,340
- Reservation: None

Member of Legislative Assembly
- 15th Maharashtra Legislative Assembly
- Incumbent Nilesh Rane
- Party: SHS
- Alliance: NDA
- Elected year: 2024

Kudal-Malvan Assembly constituency is one of the 288 Vidhan Sabha (Legislative Assembly) constituencies of Maharashtra state in Western India. This Assembly constituency is located in the Sindhudurg district.

== Members of the Legislative Assembly ==
Election	Member	Party
1952	Dhond Jagnnath Sitaram	Indian National Congress
2009	Narayan Tatu Rane	Indian National Congress
2014	Vaibhav Vijay Naik	Shiv Sena
2019	Vaibhav Vijay Naik	Shiv Sena
2024	Nilesh Narayan Rane	Shiv Sena

== Election results ==
=== Assembly Election 2024 ===
2024 Maharashtra Legislative Assembly election : Kudal
Party	Candidate	Votes	%	±%
SS	Nilesh Narayan Rane	81,659	51.76	▲0.28
SS(UBT)	Vaibhav Vijay Naik	73,483	46.58	New
NOTA	None of the above	1,078	0.68	▼0.48
Margin of victory		8,176	5.18	▼5.50
Turnout		158,847	73.09	▲10.14
Total valid votes		157,769		
Registered electors		217,340		▲0.62
SS hold		Swing	▲0.28	

=== Assembly Election 2019 ===
2019 Maharashtra Legislative Assembly election : Kudal
Party	Candidate	Votes	%	±%
SS	Vaibhav Vijay Naik	69,168	51.48	▲1.11
Independent	Ranjit Dattatray Desai	54,819	40.80	New
INC	Arvind Namdeo Mondkar	3,527	2.63	▼40.34
Independent	Balkrishna Vitthal Jadhav	3,129	2.33	New
MNS	Dheeraj Vishwanath Parab	2,399	1.79	New
NOTA	None of the above	1,552	1.16	▲0.48
Margin of victory		14,349	10.68	▲3.27
Turnout		135,968	62.95	▼5.74
Total valid votes		134,348		
Registered electors		216,008		▲5.18
SS hold		Swing	▲1.11	

=== Assembly Election 2014 ===
2014 Maharashtra Legislative Assembly election : Kudal
Party	Candidate	Votes	%	±%
SS	Vaibhav Vijay Naik	70,582	50.37	▲12.07
INC	Narayan Tatu Rane	60,206	42.97	▼14.81
BJP	Baba Alias Vishnu Mondkar	4,819	3.44	New
NCP	Pushpasen Sawant	2,692	1.92	New
BSP	Kasalkar Ravindra Harishchandra	1,071	0.76	▼0.45
NOTA	None of the above	949	0.68	New
Margin of victory		10,376	7.41	▼12.08
Turnout		141,068	68.69	▲2.00
Total valid votes		140,117		
Registered electors		205,366		▲10.04
SS gain from INC		Swing	▼7.41	

=== Assembly Election 2009 ===
2009 Maharashtra Legislative Assembly election : Kudal
Party	Candidate	Votes	%	±%
INC	Narayan Tatu Rane	71,921	57.78	▲21.91
SS	Vaibhav Vijay Naik	47,666	38.30	New
Independent	Dr. Prasad Janardan Waingankar	1,948	1.57	New
BSP	Ravindra Harischandra Kasalkar	1,503	1.21	New
RSPS	Borkar Surendra	1,427	1.15	New
Margin of victory		24,255	19.49	▲14.89
Turnout		124,466	66.69	▲23.46
Total valid votes		124,465		
Registered electors		186,624		▲279.33
INC hold		Swing	▲21.91	

=== Assembly Election 1952 ===
1952 Bombay State Legislative Assembly election : Kudal
Party	Candidate	Votes	%	±%
INC	Dhond Jagnnath Sitaram	7,629	35.87	New
Socialist	Kinalekar Pundlik Atmaram	6,651	31.27	New
PWPI	Sawant Sitaram Sakharam	3,938	18.52	New
Independent	Olkar Trinmbak Atmaram	1,849	8.69	New
Independent	Jadye Damodar Krishna	736	3.46	New
Independent	Walavalkar Vishram Narayan	464	2.18	New
Margin of victory		978	4.60	
Turnout		21,267	43.23	
Total valid votes		21,267		
Registered electors		49,198		
INC win (new seat)				

== See also ==
- Kudal
- List of constituencies of Maharashtra Vidhan Sabha
