= Kunte =

Kunte is a surname. Notable people with the surname include:

- Abhijit Kunte (born 1977), Indian chess player
- Mrunalini Kunte (born 1973), Indian chess player
- Nanasaheb Kunte, Indian politician
- Nishigandha Kunte (born 1992), Indian model
- Prabhakar Kashinath Kunte, (1922–2012), Indian politician
- Sitaram Kunte (born 1961), Indian civil servant
