= Khed Assembly constituency =

Constituency of the Maharashtra legislative assembly in India

Coordinates: 18.83°N 73.29°E

Khed
- Former constituency for the Maharashtra Legislative Assembly

Constituency details
- Country: India
- Region: Western India
- State: Maharashtra
- Lok Sabha constituency: Ratnagiri Lok Sabha constituency
- Established: 1951
- Abolished: 2008

Khed Assembly constituency was one of the 288 assembly constituencies of Maharashtra, a western state of India. Khed was also part of Ratnagiri Lok Sabha constituency. Khed seat existed till 2004 elections.

== Members of the Legislative Assembly ==
Election	Member	Party
1952	Kabirbuwa Pandharinath Ramdas	Indian National Congress
1957	Patne Jagannath Shioram	Scheduled Castes Federation
1962	Vasantrao Marutrao Manjre	Indian National Congress
1967	Husen Dalwai	Indian National Congress
1972	Husen Dalwai	Indian National Congress
1978	Bhosle Amrutrao Ganpatrao	Janata Party
1980	Kadam Tukaram Baburao	Indian National Congress
1985	Kadam Tukaram Baburao	Indian National Congress
1990	Ramdas Gangaram Kadam	Shiv Sena
1995	Ramdas Gangaram Kadam	Shiv Sena
1999	Ramdas Gangaram Kadam	Shiv Sena
2004	Ramdas Gangaram Kadam	Shiv Sena

== Election results ==
=== Assembly Election 2004 ===
2004 Maharashtra Legislative Assembly election : Khed
Party	Candidate	Votes	%	±%
SS	Ramdas Gangaram Kadam	52,881	57.10%	▼6.85
NCP	Jadhav Babaji Gopal	27,460	29.65%	▼3.00
Independent	Dattatray Pandurang Sakpal	6,897	7.45%	New
BSP	Prakash Pandurang More	2,504	2.70%	New
ABS	Suresh Jagannath Alias Jagatrao More	2,046	2.21%	New
Independent	Usha Kamalakar Guhagarkar	820	0.89%	New
Margin of victory		25,421	27.45%	▼3.84
Turnout		92,615	66.49%	▲0.22
Total valid votes		92,608		
Registered electors		139,290		▲3.90
SS hold		Swing	▼6.85	

=== Assembly Election 1999 ===
1999 Maharashtra Legislative Assembly election : Khed
Party	Candidate	Votes	%	±%
SS	Ramdas Gangaram Kadam	54,639	63.95%	▼3.50
NCP	Bhosale Keshavarao Jagatarao	27,900	32.65%	New
INC	Desai Shahabuddin Abdulla	2,230	2.61%	▼27.81
Independent	Jayantarao Narayan Mahadik	559	0.65%	New
Margin of victory		26,739	31.29%	▼5.75
Turnout		88,839	66.27%	▼12.29
Total valid votes		85,446		
Registered electors		134,063		▲2.73
SS hold		Swing	▼3.50	

=== Assembly Election 1995 ===
1995 Maharashtra Legislative Assembly election : Khed
Party	Candidate	Votes	%	±%
SS	Ramdas Gangaram Kadam	67,344	67.45%	▲21.14
INC	Bhosle Asha Keshavrao	30,369	30.42%	▲9.14
Independent	Chavan Kashiram Shivaji	932	0.93%	New
Independent	Parkar Mohmad Umar	928	0.93%	New
Margin of victory		36,975	37.04%	▲20.14
Turnout		102,517	78.56%	▲9.63
Total valid votes		99,837		
Registered electors		130,500		▲3.79
SS hold		Swing	▲21.14	

=== Assembly Election 1990 ===
1990 Maharashtra Legislative Assembly election : Khed
Party	Candidate	Votes	%	±%
SS	Ramdas Gangaram Kadam	39,191	46.31%	New
Independent	Bhosale Keshavarao Jagatarao	24,889	29.41%	New
INC	Kadam Tukaram Baburao	18,007	21.28%	▼34.49
JD	Kadam Krishnakant Dharu	1,504	1.78%	New
Independent	Ganjekar Vaman Keshao	560	0.66%	New
Margin of victory		14,302	16.90%	▼6.44
Turnout		86,672	68.93%	▲4.08
Total valid votes		84,630		
Registered electors		125,731		▲23.24
SS gain from INC		Swing	▼9.46	

=== Assembly Election 1985 ===
1985 Maharashtra Legislative Assembly election : Khed
Party	Candidate	Votes	%	±%
INC	Kadam Tukaram Baburao	35,655	55.77%	New
Independent	Kehsvrao Jagatrao Bhosale	20,732	32.43%	New
Independent	Kanade Kishor Vithoba	2,884	4.51%	New
RPI	Gambre Shankar Ramji	2,538	3.97%	New
IC(S)	Dattatraya Anantrao Bhosale	1,351	2.11%	New
Independent	Belose Uday Ramchandra	540	0.84%	New
Margin of victory		14,923	23.34%	▲0.89
Turnout		66,156	64.85%	▲20.16
Total valid votes		63,931		
Registered electors		102,020		▲5.53
INC gain from INC(I)		Swing	▼1.79	

=== Assembly Election 1980 ===
1980 Maharashtra Legislative Assembly election : Khed
Party	Candidate	Votes	%	±%
INC(I)	Kadam Tukaram Baburao	24,334	57.56%	New
JP	Bhosle Amrutrao Ganpatrao	14,845	35.12%	New
INC(U)	Prakash Hanumantrao Surve	2,605	6.16%	New
Independent	Bhosale Rajaram Jagatrao	331	0.78%	New
Margin of victory		9,489	22.45%	▲17.87
Turnout		43,205	44.69%	▼19.18
Total valid votes		42,273		
Registered electors		96,673		▲1.58
INC(I) gain from JP		Swing	▲5.52	

=== Assembly Election 1978 ===
1978 Maharashtra Legislative Assembly election : Khed
Party	Candidate	Votes	%	±%
JP	Bhosle Amrutrao Ganpatrao	30,158	52.04%	New
INC	Husen Dalwai	27,506	47.46%	▼21.01
Margin of victory		2,652	4.58%	▼52.07
Turnout		60,782	63.87%	▲8.30
Total valid votes		57,957		
Registered electors		95,165		▲14.54
JP gain from INC		Swing	▼16.43	

=== Assembly Election 1972 ===
1972 Maharashtra Legislative Assembly election : Khed
Party	Candidate	Votes	%	±%
INC	Husen Dalwai	30,081	68.47%	▲18.81
ABJS	Palane Madhao Ramajee	5,196	11.83%	▲4.60
SS	Bhai Bhosale	4,791	10.91%	New
CPI	Jogalekar Sadashiv Vishnu	3,862	8.79%	New
Margin of victory		24,885	56.65%	▲34.52
Turnout		46,174	55.57%	▼3.18
Total valid votes		43,930		
Registered electors		83,088		▲8.55
INC hold		Swing	▲18.81	

=== Assembly Election 1967 ===
1967 Maharashtra Legislative Assembly election : Khed
Party	Candidate	Votes	%	±%
INC	Husen Dalwai	20,203	49.66%	▼13.20
Independent	T. B. More	11,199	27.53%	New
Independent	M. B. Pawar	4,394	10.80%	New
ABJS	M. H. Jadhav	2,942	7.23%	New
Independent	V. A. More	1,942	4.77%	New
Margin of victory		9,004	22.13%	▼22.45
Turnout		44,967	58.75%	▲15.26
Total valid votes		40,680		
Registered electors		76,541		▲1.63
INC hold		Swing	▼13.20	

=== Assembly Election 1962 ===
1962 Maharashtra Legislative Assembly election : Khed
Party	Candidate	Votes	%	±%
INC	Vasantrao Marutrao Manjre	19,267	62.86%	▲13.27
ABJS	Narayan Balwant Ghumatkar	5,602	18.28%	New
Independent	Atmaram Hari Dhasal	2,637	8.60%	New
Independent	Baburao Ramjee Raundhal	1,521	4.96%	New
PWPI	Sandbhor Mahdav Alias Babanrao Nathujee	1,310	4.27%	New
Independent	Ramchandra Tukaram Waghmare	314	1.02%	New
Margin of victory		13,665	44.58%	▲24.92
Turnout		32,754	43.49%	▼10.13
Total valid votes		30,651		
Registered electors		75,314		▲22.16
INC gain from SCF		Swing	▲11.41	

=== Assembly Election 1957 ===
1957 Bombay State Legislative Assembly election : Khed
Party	Candidate	Votes	%	±%
SCF	Patne Jagannath Shioram	17,009	51.45%	▲32.95
INC	Dalvai Husein Misarikhan	10,511	31.80%	▼43.11
PSP	Vadgaonkar Tarachand Hirachand	9,804	29.66%	New
INC	Sandbhor Raghunath Abaji	5,883	17.80%	▼57.11
Independent	Bhosale Shantaram Ganpatrao	5,538	16.75%	New
Independent	Ghumatkar Narayan Balwant	4,954	14.99%	New
Margin of victory		6,498	19.66%	▼36.75
Turnout		33,058	53.62%	▲15.02
Total valid votes		33,058		
Registered electors		61,652		▲10.15
SCF gain from INC		Swing	▼23.46	

=== Assembly Election 1952 ===
1952 Bombay State Legislative Assembly election : Khed
Party	Candidate	Votes	%	±%
INC	Kabirbuwa Pandharinath Ramdas	16,184	74.91%	New
SCF	Mali Narayan Balwant	3,997	18.50%	New
RRP	Shinde Pandurang Govind	1,424	6.59%	New
Margin of victory		12,187	56.41%	
Turnout		21,605	38.60%	
Total valid votes		21,605		
Registered electors		55,972		
INC win (new seat)				

== See also ==
- Ratnagiri Lok Sabha constituency
- List of constituencies of Maharashtra Legislative Assembly
