= Dapoli Assembly constituency =

Constituency of the Maharashtra legislative assembly in India

Coordinates: 17°46′00.30″N 73°10′05.06″E

Dapoli
- Constituency No. 263 for the Maharashtra Legislative Assembly

Constituency details
- Country: India
- Region: Western India
- State: Maharashtra
- District: Ratnagiri
- Lok Sabha constituency: Raigad
- Established: 1955
- Total electors: 291,526
- Reservation: None

Member of Legislative Assembly
- 15th Maharashtra Legislative Assembly
- Incumbent Yogesh Kadam
- Party: SHS
- Alliance: NDA
- Elected year: 2024

Dapoli Assembly constituency is one of the 288 Vidhan Sabha (Legislative Assembly) constituencies of Maharashtra state in western India.

== Overview ==
Dapoli constituency is one of the five Vidhan Sabha constituencies located in Ratnagiri district.

Before the delimitation of the parliamentary constituencies in 2008, Dapoli was part of the Ratnagiri Lok Sabha constituency. After the delimitation, it became part of the Raigad Lok Sabha constituency, along with five other Vidhan Sabha segments, namely Guhagar in the Ratnagiri district and Pen, Alibag, Shrivardhan and Mahad in the Raigad district.

== Members of the Legislative Assembly ==
Year	Member	Party
1957	Purushottam Vasudeo Mandlik	Praja Socialist Party
1962	Ramchandra Vithal Bhelose	Indian National Congress
1967	Ramchandra Vithal Bhelose	Indian National Congress
1972	Ramchandra Vithal Bhelose	Indian National Congress
1978	Gangaram Daulat Sakpal	Janata Party
1980	Gangaram Daulat Sakpal	Janata Party
1985	Chandrakant Mokal	Indian National Congress
1990	Suryakant Shivram Dalvi	Shiv Sena
1995	Suryakant Shivram Dalvi	Shiv Sena
1999	Suryakant Shivram Dalvi	Shiv Sena
2004	Suryakant Shivram Dalvi	Shiv Sena
2009	Suryakant Shivram Dalvi	Shiv Sena
2014	Sanjay Vasant Kadam	Nationalist Congress Party
2019	Yogesh Ramdas Kadam	Shiv Sena
2024	Yogesh Ramdas Kadam	Shiv Sena

== Election results ==
=== Assembly Election 2024 ===
2024 Maharashtra Legislative Assembly election : Dapoli
Party	Candidate	Votes	%	±%
SS	Yogeshdada Ramdas Kadam	105,007	53.62%	▲1.55
SS(UBT)	Kadam Sanjay Vasant	80,914	41.32%	New
MNS	Abgul Santosh Sonu	4,960	2.53%	New
BSP	Marchande Pravin Sahadev	1,816	0.93%	▼0.17
NOTA	None of the Above	1,117	0.57%	▼0.91
Margin of victory		24,093	12.30%	▲4.89
Turnout		196,939	67.55%	▲1.36
Total valid votes		195,822		
Registered electors		291,526		▲3.83
SS hold		Swing	▲1.55	

=== Assembly Election 2019 ===
2019 Maharashtra Legislative Assembly election : Dapoli
Party	Candidate	Votes	%	±%
SS	Yogeshdada Ramdas Kadam	95,364	52.07%	▲21.18
NCP	Kadam Sanjayrao Vasant	81,786	44.66%	▲11.39
NOTA	None of the Above	2,711	1.48%	▼0.62
BSP	Marchande Pravin Sahadeo	2,015	1.10%	New
VBA	Khopkar Santosh Dattaram	1,336	0.73%	New
Margin of victory		13,578	7.41%	▲5.03
Turnout		185,864	66.19%	▲5.93
Total valid votes		183,150		
Registered electors		280,785		▲6.40
SS gain from NCP		Swing	▲18.80	

=== Assembly Election 2014 ===
2014 Maharashtra Legislative Assembly election : Dapoli
Party	Candidate	Votes	%	±%
NCP	Kadam Sanjay Vasant	52,907	33.27%	New
SS	Dalvi Suryakant Shivram	49,123	30.89%	▼22.70
Independent	Dhadave Shashikant Pandurang	19,106	12.01%	New
BJP	Kedar Bhikaji Sathe	13,971	8.79%	New
MNS	Khedekar Vaibhav Sadanand	8,937	5.62%	▼3.30
Independent	Kishor Desai	5,272	3.32%	New
INC	Ziman Sujit Bhagoji	4,712	2.96%	▼17.17
NOTA	None of the Above	3,346	2.10%	New
Margin of victory		3,784	2.38%	▼31.07
Turnout		162,535	61.59%	▲1.85
Total valid votes		159,030		
Registered electors		263,886		▲10.18
NCP gain from SS		Swing	▼20.32	

=== Assembly Election 2009 ===
2009 Maharashtra Legislative Assembly election : Dapoli
Party	Candidate	Votes	%	±%
SS	Dalvi Suryakant Shivram	74,973	53.59%	▲4.07
INC	Bhosale Vijay Krishnaji	28,169	20.13%	▼4.91
MNS	Santosh Madhusudan Shirke	12,481	8.92%	New
Independent	Pramod Bhosale	6,898	4.93%	New
BSP	Khambe Dnyandev Ramchandra	5,615	4.01%	▼1.31
Independent	Chandrakant Ganpat Mohite	4,673	3.34%	New
RPI(A)	Pritam Laxman Ruke	4,177	2.99%	New
Margin of victory		46,804	33.45%	▲8.98
Turnout		140,799	58.79%	▼8.08
Total valid votes		139,907		
Registered electors		239,495		▲63.56
SS hold		Swing	▲4.07	

=== Assembly Election 2004 ===
2004 Maharashtra Legislative Assembly election : Dapoli
Party	Candidate	Votes	%	±%
SS	Dalvi Suryakant Shivram	48,219	49.52%	▼8.31
INC	Mokal Chandrakant Jagannath	24,385	25.04%	▼7.61
Independent	Desai Kishor Bhalchandra	19,585	20.11%	New
BSP	Khambe Dnyandev Ramchandra	5,186	5.33%	New
Margin of victory		23,834	24.48%	▼0.70
Turnout		97,708	66.73%	▲2.89
Total valid votes		97,375		
Registered electors		146,424		▲6.15
SS hold		Swing	▼8.31	

=== Assembly Election 1999 ===
1999 Maharashtra Legislative Assembly election : Dapoli
Party	Candidate	Votes	%	±%
SS	Dalvi Suryakant Shivram	50,738	57.83%	▼5.56
INC	Ashok Arjunrao Alias Bhai Jagtap	28,648	32.65%	▼3.97
Independent	Posture Daulatrao Pandurang	4,399	5.01%	New
Independent	Jadhav Manohar Gauroji	3,657	4.17%	New
Margin of victory		22,090	25.18%	▼1.59
Turnout		91,975	66.68%	▼14.01
Total valid votes		87,742		
Registered electors		137,943		▲4.45
SS hold		Swing	▼5.56	

=== Assembly Election 1995 ===
1995 Maharashtra Legislative Assembly election : Dapoli
Party	Candidate	Votes	%	±%
SS	Dalvi Suryakant Shivram	64,975	63.38%	▲10.51
INC	Posture Daulatrao Pandurang	37,539	36.62%	▲11.90
Margin of victory		27,436	26.76%	▼1.39
Turnout		106,238	80.44%	▲10.45
Total valid votes		102,514		
Registered electors		132,072		▲0.05
SS hold		Swing	▲10.51	

=== Assembly Election 1990 ===
1990 Maharashtra Legislative Assembly election : Dapoli
Party	Candidate	Votes	%	±%
SS	Dalvi Suryakant Shivram	46,882	52.87%	New
INC	Vidya Belose	21,917	24.72%	▼10.16
JD	G. D. Sakpal	11,788	13.29%	New
Independent	Uday Alias Bal Belose	6,893	7.77%	New
Independent	Deasi Shahabuddin Abduila	767	0.86%	New
Margin of victory		24,965	28.15%	▲25.54
Turnout		90,822	68.80%	▲9.83
Total valid votes		88,675		
Registered electors		132,008		▲17.45
SS gain from INC		Swing	▲18.00	

=== Assembly Election 1985 ===
1985 Maharashtra Legislative Assembly election : Dapoli
Party	Candidate	Votes	%	±%
INC	Chandrakant Mokal	22,478	34.87%	New
JP	G. D. Sakpal	20,795	32.26%	▼15.04
Independent	R. V. Alies Baburao Belose	14,304	22.19%	New
Independent	K. D. Chafe	6,256	9.71%	New
Independent	Mourya Ramdawan Sukhu	519	0.81%	New
Margin of victory		1,683	2.61%	▲0.00
Turnout		66,351	59.03%	▲5.56
Total valid votes		64,456		
Registered electors		112,398		▲9.57
INC gain from JP		Swing	▼12.43	

=== Assembly Election 1980 ===
1980 Maharashtra Legislative Assembly election : Dapoli
Party	Candidate	Votes	%	±%
JP	Sakpal Gangaram Daulat	25,130	47.30%	▼13.12
INC(I)	Belose Ramchandra Vithal	23,745	44.70%	▲41.68
Independent	Mokal Chandramant Jagannath	4,251	8.00%	New
Margin of victory		1,385	2.61%	▼21.25
Turnout		55,057	53.67%	▼13.89
Total valid votes		53,126		
Registered electors		102,582		▼1.37
JP hold		Swing	▼13.12	

=== Assembly Election 1978 ===
1978 Maharashtra Legislative Assembly election : Dapoli
Party	Candidate	Votes	%	±%
JP	Sakpal Gangaram Daulat	41,273	60.42%	New
INC	Belose Ramchandra Vithal	24,978	36.57%	▼17.54
INC(I)	Shiwgan Pandoorang Daji	2,057	3.01%	New
Margin of victory		16,295	23.86%	▲15.65
Turnout		72,650	69.85%	▼0.06
Total valid votes		68,308		
Registered electors		104,008		▲22.39
JP gain from INC		Swing	▲6.32	

=== Assembly Election 1972 ===
1972 Maharashtra Legislative Assembly election : Dapoli
Party	Candidate	Votes	%	±%
INC	Ramchandra Vithal Bhelose	30,221	54.10%	▲6.47
Independent	Sakpal Gangaram Daulat	25,637	45.90%	New
Margin of victory		4,584	8.21%	▼11.82
Turnout		59,682	70.23%	▲6.98
Total valid votes		55,858		
Registered electors		84,978		▲11.02
INC hold		Swing	▲6.47	

=== Assembly Election 1967 ===
1967 Maharashtra Legislative Assembly election : Dapoli
Party	Candidate	Votes	%	±%
INC	Ramchandra Vithal Bhelose	21,423	47.63%	▼8.34
Independent	G. D. Sakpal	12,416	27.61%	New
ABJS	A. N. Pawar	6,813	15.15%	▼8.16
Independent	K. D. Jadhav	2,551	5.67%	New
RPI	S. D. More	1,771	3.94%	New
Margin of victory		9,007	20.03%	▼12.64
Turnout		50,850	66.43%	▲14.69
Total valid votes		44,974		
Registered electors		76,546		▲26.16
INC hold		Swing	▼8.34	

=== Assembly Election 1962 ===
1962 Maharashtra Legislative Assembly election : Dapoli
Party	Candidate	Votes	%	±%
INC	Ramchandra Vithal Bhelose	14,966	55.98%	▲23.17
ABJS	Sharad Govind Dandekar	6,231	23.31%	New
PSP	Pandurang Daji Shigwan	3,805	14.23%	▼52.96
ABHM	Kashinath Bhargao Limaye	1,734	6.49%	New
Margin of victory		8,735	32.67%	▼1.71
Turnout		30,657	50.53%	▼9.85
Total valid votes		26,736		
Registered electors		60,675		▼0.12
INC gain from PSP		Swing	▼11.21	

=== Assembly Election 1957 ===
1957 Bombay State Legislative Assembly election : Dapoli
Party	Candidate	Votes	%	±%
PSP	Mandlik Purshottam Vasudeo	22,004	67.19%	New
INC	Peje Shantaram Laxman	10,745	32.81%	New
Margin of victory		11,259	34.38%	
Turnout		32,749	53.91%	
Total valid votes		32,749		
Registered electors		60,747		
PSP gain from INC		Swing		

== See also ==
- Dapoli
- List of constituencies of Maharashtra Vidhan Sabha
