= Guhagar Assembly constituency =

Constituency of the Maharashtra legislative assembly in India

Coordinates: 17°28′57.09″N 73°10′24.34″E

Guhagar
- Constituency No. 264 for the Maharashtra Legislative Assembly

Constituency details
- Country: India
- Region: Western India
- State: Maharashtra
- District: Ratnagiri
- Lok Sabha constituency: Raigad
- Established: 1952
- Total electors: 242,949
- Reservation: None

Member of Legislative Assembly
- 15th Maharashtra Legislative Assembly
- Incumbent Bhaskar Jadhav
- Party: SS(UBT)
- Alliance: MVA
- Elected year: 2024

Guhagar Assembly constituency is one of the 288 Vidhan Sabha (Legislative Assembly) constituencies of Maharashtra state in western India.

== Overview ==
Guhagar constituency is one of the five Vidhan Sabha constituencies located in the Ratnagiri district.

Before the delimitation of the parliamentary constituencies in 2008, Guhagar was part of the Ratnagiri Lok Sabha constituency. After the delimitation, it became part of the Raigad Lok Sabha constituency along with five other Vidhan Sabha segments, namely Dapoli in the Ratnagiri district and Pen, Alibag, Shrivardhan and Mahad in the Raigad district.

== Members of the Legislative Assembly ==
Election	Member	Party
1952	Pawar Mahadeo Ramchandra	Indian National Congress
1957	Vilankar Dattatraya Yeshawant	Bharatiya Jana Sangh
1962	Purushottam Vasudeo Mandlik	Praja Socialist Party
1967	M. S. Kesarkar	Indian National Congress
1972	Shridhar Dattatray Natu	Bharatiya Jana Sangh
1978	Shridhar Dattatray Natu	Janata Party
1980	Bendal Ramchandra Sadashiv	Indian National Congress
1985	Shridhar Dattatray Natu	Bharatiya Janata Party
1990	Shridhar Dattatray Natu	Bharatiya Janata Party
1995	Dr. Vinay Shridhar Natu	Bharatiya Janata Party
1999	Dr. Vinay Shridhar Natu	Bharatiya Janata Party
2004	Dr. Vinay Shridhar Natu	Bharatiya Janata Party
2009	Bhaskar Bhaurao Jadhav	Nationalist Congress Party
2014	Bhaskar Bhaurao Jadhav	Nationalist Congress Party
2019	Bhaskar Bhaurao Jadhav	Shiv Sena
2024	Bhaskar Bhaurao Jadhav	Shiv Sena (UBT)

== Election results ==
=== Assembly Election 2024 ===
2024 Maharashtra Legislative Assembly election : Guhagar
Party	Candidate	Votes	%	±%
SS(UBT)	Bhaskar Bhaurao Jadhav	71,241	47.40%	New
SS	Bendal Rajesh Ramchandra	68,411	45.52%	▼10.47
MNS	Gandhi Pramod Sitaram	6,712	4.47%	▲2.68
Independent	Sunil Sakharam Jadhav	1,761	1.17%	New
NOTA	None of the above	1,197	0.80%	▼0.67
RSPS	Pramod Parshuram Ambre	965	0.64%	New
Margin of victory		2,830	1.88%	▼16.93
Turnout		151,487	62.35%	▲2.90
Total valid votes		150,290		
Registered electors		242,949		▲1.07
SS(UBT) gain from SS		Swing	▼8.59	

=== Assembly Election 2019 ===
2019 Maharashtra Legislative Assembly election : Guhagar
Party	Candidate	Votes	%	±%
SS	Bhaskar Bhaurao Jadhav	78,748	55.99%	▲34.65
NCP	Betkar Sahadev Devji	52,297	37.18%	▼11.06
VBA	Jadhav Vikas Yashwant	5,069	3.60%	New
MNS	Ganesh Arun Kadam	2,524	1.79%	New
NOTA	None of the above	2,061	1.47%	▲0.34
BSP	Umesh Uday Pawar	2,009	1.43%	▼0.34
Margin of victory		26,451	18.81%	▼2.98
Turnout		142,913	59.45%	▼7.09
Total valid votes		140,647		
Registered electors		240,386		▲5.17
SS gain from NCP		Swing	▲7.75	

=== Assembly Election 2014 ===
2014 Maharashtra Legislative Assembly election : Guhagar
Party	Candidate	Votes	%	±%
NCP	Bhaskar Bhaurao Jadhav	72,525	48.24%	▲10.87
BJP	Dr. Vinay Shridhar Natu	39,761	26.45%	New
SS	Bhosle Vijaykumar Ganpat	32,083	21.34%	▼6.83
INC	Sawant Sandip Shivram	3,315	2.20%	New
BSP	Gamare Suresh Mahadev	2,663	1.77%	▲0.03
NOTA	None of the above	1,693	1.13%	New
Margin of victory		32,764	21.79%	▲12.59
Turnout		152,091	66.54%	▼2.67
Total valid votes		150,347		
Registered electors		228,577		▲11.30
NCP hold		Swing	▲10.87	

=== Assembly Election 2009 ===
2009 Maharashtra Legislative Assembly election : Guhagar
Party	Candidate	Votes	%	±%
NCP	Bhaskar Bhaurao Jadhav	53,108	37.37%	▲6.62
SS	Ramdas Gangaram Kadam	40,032	28.17%	New
Independent	Dr. Vinay Shridhar Natu	29,606	20.83%	New
MNS	Vaibhav Sadanand Khedekar	6,860	4.83%	New
RPI	Suresh Bhikaji Sawant	3,785	2.66%	New
Independent	Sadanand Shantaram Pawar	2,543	1.79%	New
BSP	Uday Arjun Pawar	2,473	1.74%	▲0.40
Independent	Shrikant Shivram Kadam	1,732	1.22%	New
Margin of victory		13,076	9.20%	▼18.82
Turnout		142,143	69.21%	▲0.89
Total valid votes		142,111		
Registered electors		205,376		▲39.47
NCP gain from BJP		Swing	▼21.40	

=== Assembly Election 2004 ===
2004 Maharashtra Legislative Assembly election : Guhagar
Party	Candidate	Votes	%	±%
BJP	Dr. Vinay Shridhar Natu	59,119	58.77%	▲9.36
NCP	Nandkishor Rajaram Pawar	30,936	30.75%	▼1.20
Independent	V. G. Patil	7,243	7.20%	New
BSP	Sakharam Laxman Pawar	1,347	1.34%	New
Independent	T. S. Kadam	1,322	1.31%	New
PWPI	Sachin Suresh Mahajan	630	0.63%	New
Margin of victory		28,183	28.02%	▲10.56
Turnout		100,601	68.32%	▲6.29
Total valid votes		100,597		
Registered electors		147,250		▲6.17
BJP hold		Swing	▲9.36	

=== Assembly Election 1999 ===
1999 Maharashtra Legislative Assembly election : Guhagar
Party	Candidate	Votes	%	±%
BJP	Dr. Vinay Shridhar Natu	38,861	49.41%	▼9.22
NCP	Bait Chandrakant Dhondu	25,126	31.95%	New
INC	Pednekar Pralhad Dattaram	6,347	8.07%	▼12.60
Independent	Velhal Suchita Sushil	5,350	6.80%	New
Independent	Kapadi Mahendra Alies Rajan Narayan	2,965	3.77%	New
Margin of victory		13,735	17.46%	▼20.50
Turnout		86,037	62.03%	▼12.53
Total valid votes		78,649		
Registered electors		138,696		▲1.31
BJP hold		Swing	▼9.22	

=== Assembly Election 1995 ===
1995 Maharashtra Legislative Assembly election : Guhagar
Party	Candidate	Votes	%	±%
BJP	Dr. Vinay Shridhar Natu	57,789	58.63%	▲3.53
INC	Adv. Mohite Dayanand Bhaguram	20,377	20.67%	▼21.37
Independent	Ghanekar Dhaku Bhagoji	11,711	11.88%	New
Independent	Tatkare Sitaram Mahadev	4,606	4.67%	New
Independent	Kadam Mahendra (Sada)	1,076	1.09%	New
Doordarshi Party	Prabhakar Kelkar	993	1.01%	New
JD	Hafizbhai Sarguroh	847	0.86%	▼0.97
Independent	Pawar Anant Vithal	807	0.82%	New
Margin of victory		37,412	37.96%	▲24.91
Turnout		102,068	74.56%	▲6.68
Total valid votes		98,569		
Registered electors		136,899		▲3.55
BJP hold		Swing	▲3.53	

=== Assembly Election 1990 ===
1990 Maharashtra Legislative Assembly election : Guhagar
Party	Candidate	Votes	%	±%
BJP	Shridhar Dattatray Natu	48,116	55.10%	▲8.24
INC	Bendal Ramchandra Sadashiv	36,716	42.04%	▲32.69
JD	Nandusheth Ramchandra Tharwal	1,597	1.83%	New
BSP	S. K. Patil	899	1.03%	New
Margin of victory		11,400	13.05%	▼1.00
Turnout		89,740	67.88%	▲8.09
Total valid votes		87,328		
Registered electors		132,200		▲18.59
BJP hold		Swing	▲8.24	

=== Assembly Election 1985 ===
1985 Maharashtra Legislative Assembly election : Guhagar
Party	Candidate	Votes	%	±%
BJP	Shridhar Dattatray Natu	30,338	46.86%	▼0.93
Independent	Ghanekar Dhaku Bhagoji	21,245	32.82%	New
INC	M. S. Kesarkar	6,051	9.35%	New
Independent	Prabhakar Balwant Jadhav	4,363	6.74%	New
Independent	Shekhason	1,962	3.03%	New
Independent	Yadao Lalsa Sahadeo	779	1.20%	New
Margin of victory		9,093	14.05%	▲13.63
Turnout		66,660	59.79%	▲5.00
Total valid votes		64,738		
Registered electors		111,481		▲10.47
BJP gain from INC(I)		Swing	▼1.35	

=== Assembly Election 1980 ===
1980 Maharashtra Legislative Assembly election : Guhagar
Party	Candidate	Votes	%	±%
INC(I)	Bendal Ramchandra Sadashiv	25,767	48.21%	New
BJP	Natu Dr. Shridhar Dattatray	25,541	47.79%	New
Independent	Mohite Arjun Dhondu	2,140	4.00%	New
Margin of victory		226	0.42%	▼31.97
Turnout		55,290	54.79%	▼10.95
Total valid votes		53,448		
Registered electors		100,916		▲3.29
INC(I) gain from JP		Swing	▼17.98	

=== Assembly Election 1978 ===
1978 Maharashtra Legislative Assembly election : Guhagar
Party	Candidate	Votes	%	±%
JP	Shridhar Dattatray Natu	40,320	66.19%	New
INC	Nikam Govind Shivajirao	20,592	33.81%	▼9.46
Margin of victory		19,728	32.39%	▲27.43
Turnout		64,233	65.74%	▲4.89
Total valid votes		60,912		
Registered electors		97,701		▲21.66
JP gain from ABJS		Swing	▲17.96	

=== Assembly Election 1972 ===
1972 Maharashtra Legislative Assembly election : Guhagar
Party	Candidate	Votes	%	±%
ABJS	Shridhar Dattatray Natu	22,145	48.23%	▲12.37
INC	Ramchandra S. Bendal	19,866	43.27%	▲0.81
Independent	Ganesh Babaji Pawar	3,054	6.65%	New
SS	Shantaram Sonu Solakar	852	1.86%	New
Margin of victory		2,279	4.96%	▼1.63
Turnout		48,868	60.85%	▼2.31
Total valid votes		45,917		
Registered electors		80,309		▲5.49
ABJS gain from INC		Swing	▲5.77	

=== Assembly Election 1967 ===
1967 Maharashtra Legislative Assembly election : Guhagar
Party	Candidate	Votes	%	±%
INC	M. S. Kesarkar	18,484	42.46%	▲11.07
ABJS	P. R. Asar	15,614	35.86%	New
Independent	V. S. Kadam	4,763	10.94%	New
Independent	D. V. Jogalekar	3,113	7.15%	New
Independent	A. M. Kumbhar	1,563	3.59%	New
Margin of victory		2,870	6.59%	▲3.93
Turnout		48,082	63.16%	▲11.46
Total valid votes		43,537		
Registered electors		76,130		▲37.28
INC gain from PSP		Swing	▲8.42	

=== Assembly Election 1962 ===
1962 Maharashtra Legislative Assembly election : Guhagar
Party	Candidate	Votes	%	±%
PSP	Purushottam Vasudeo Mandlik	8,232	34.04%	New
INC	Kesarkar Mahadeo Soma	7,590	31.39%	▲6.54
ABJS	Ramchandra Gopal Mahajan	6,079	25.14%	New
Independent	Shankar Mahadeo Dingankar	2,279	9.43%	New
Margin of victory		642	2.66%	▼47.64
Turnout		28,667	51.70%	▲10.79
Total valid votes		24,180		
Registered electors		55,454		▼1.23
PSP gain from ABJS		Swing	▼41.11	

=== Assembly Election 1957 ===
1957 Bombay State Legislative Assembly election : Guhagar
Party	Candidate	Votes	%	±%
ABJS	Vilankar Dattatraya Yeshawant	17,260	75.15%	New
INC	Kesarkar Mahadeo Soma	5,707	24.85%	▼10.08
Margin of victory		11,553	50.30%	▲36.35
Turnout		22,967	40.91%	▲6.60
Total valid votes		22,967		
Registered electors		56,145		▲6.87
ABJS gain from INC		Swing	▲40.22	

=== Assembly Election 1952 ===
1952 Bombay State Legislative Assembly election : Guhagar
Party	Candidate	Votes	%	±%
INC	Pawar Mahadeo Ramchandra	6,296	34.93%	New
Independent	Vilankar Yeshwant Bhikaji	3,781	20.98%	New
Independent	Kangutkar Dasharath Tatyaji	2,688	14.91%	New
SCF	Kadam Vishram Shivram	2,392	13.27%	New
Independent	Shirke Balkrishna Ganpat	1,110	6.16%	New
Independent	Surve Gopal Kashinath	762	4.23%	New
Independent	Desai Anant Ambaji	548	3.04%	New
Independent	Bhosle Rajaram Gharu	448	2.49%	New
Margin of victory		2,515	13.95%	
Turnout		18,025	34.31%	
Total valid votes		18,025		
Registered electors		52,536		
INC win (new seat)				

== See also ==
- Guhagar
- List of constituencies of Maharashtra Vidhan Sabha
