= Anant Geete =

Indian politician

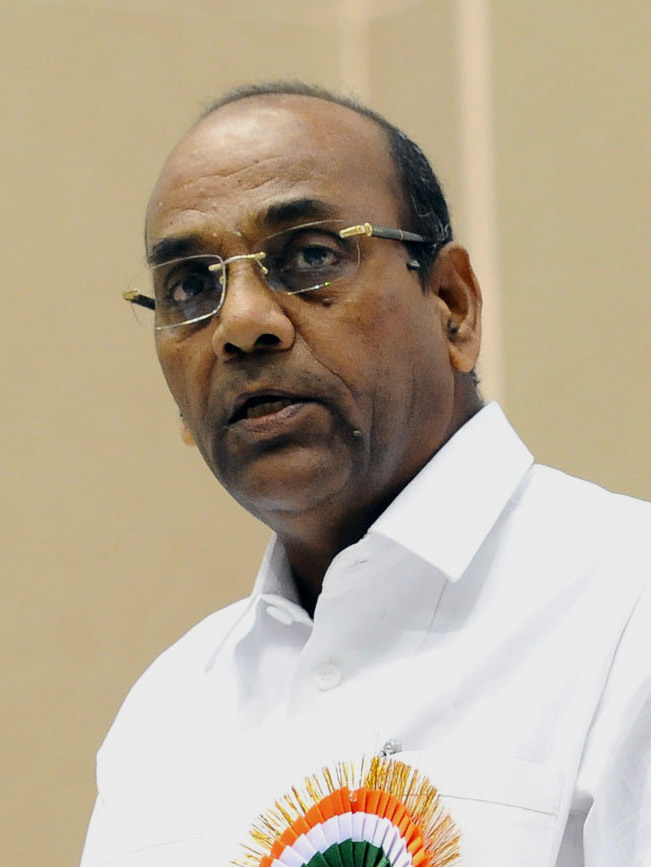

Member of Shiv Sena's National Executive
- In office January 23, 2018 – February 10, 2023

Minister of Heavy Industries & Public Enterprises
- In office 26 May 2014 – 30 May 2019
- Prime Minister: Narendra Modi
- Preceded by: Praful Patel
- Succeeded by: Arvind Sawant

Minister of Power
- In office 26 August 2002 – 22 May 2004
- Prime Minister: Atal Bihari Vajpayee
- Preceded by: Suresh Prabhu
- Succeeded by: P. M. Sayeed

Member of Parliament, Lok Sabha
- In office 16 May 2009 – 23 May 2019
- Preceded by: Constituency created
- Succeeded by: Sunil Tatkare
- Constituency: Raigad
- In office 10 May 1996 – 16 May 2009
- Preceded by: Govindrao Nikam
- Succeeded by: Constituency abolished
- Constituency: Ratnagiri

Personal details
- Born: 2 June 1951 (age 75) Tisangi, Bombay State, India
- Party: Shiv Sena (Uddhav Balasaheb Thackeray)
- Spouse: Ashwinee
- As of May, 2014

Anant Gangaram Geete (born 2 June 1951) is an Indian politician and was the Union Cabinet Minister for Heavy Industries and Public Sector Enterprises between 2014 - 2019 in the Narendra Modi cabinet. He is also a former Union Cabinet Minister for Power (Aug 2002 to May 2004). He is a member of the Shiv Sena (Uddhav Balasaheb Thackeray) political party in Maharashtra, India.

He was elected six times to the Lok Sabha. In the 2009 general election, he defeated the then sitting MP and former Cabinet Minister A.R.Antulay, by a margin of 145,000 votes to win from Raigad, Maharashtra. In the 2014 general election, he held his seat in Raigad by a margin of 2,110 votes over his nearest rival, Sunil Tatkare who was then the Minister for Water Resources in Maharashtra but lost it in 2019 by a margin of 31,740 votes. He has earlier represented the Ratnagiri constituency in Maharashtra for four terms from 11th Lok Sabha to 14th Lok Sabha.

== Early life ==
He was born in Tisangi, a village in Ratnagiri District, Maharashtra.

== Political career ==
=== Positions held in public life ===
| 1985–92 | Councillor, Municipal Corporation, Mumbai |
| 1990–92 | Chairman, Standing Committee on Municipal Corporation Mumbai |
| 1996 | Elected to 11th Lok Sabha from Ratnagiri (1st term). Chief Whip, Shiv Sena Parliamentary party |
| 1996–98 | Member, Committee on Urban and Rural Development |
| 1998 | Re-elected to 12th Lok Sabha (2nd term) |
| 1998–99 | Member, Committee on External Affairs and its Sub-Committee-III. Member Consultative Committee, Ministry of Human Resource Development |
| 1999 | Re-elected to 13th Lok Sabha (3rd term). Leader, Shiv Sena Parliamentary Party |
| 1999–2000 | Chairman, Committee on Urban and Rural Development. Member, Business Advisory Committee. Member, General Purposes Committee. Member, Railway Convention Committee. |
| 1999–2001 | Member, Committee on Estimates |
| 2000–2002 | Member, Consultative Committee. Ministry of Civil Aviation |
| Jul–Aug 2002 | Union Minister of State, Ministry of Finance, Banking and Expenditure |
| Aug 2002 – May 2004 | Union Cabinet Minister, Power |
| 2004 | Re-elected to 14th Lok Sabha (4th term) Member, General Purposes Committee. Chairman, Committee on Chemicals and Fertilizers; Member, Committee on Petitions |
| Aug 2007 onwards | Chairman, Committee on Chemicals & Fertilizers |
| 2009 | Re-elected to 15th Lok Sabha (5th term) Leader, Shiv Sena Parliamentary Party, Lok Sabha |
| 23 Sep 2009 | Chairman, Committee on Petitions Member, Committee on Food, Consumer Affairs & Public Distribution. Member, Business Advisory Committee |
| | Member, Konkan Railway Users' Consultative Committee |
| 2014 | Re-elected to 16th Lok Sabha (6th term) |
| 28 May 2014 | Union Cabinet Minister, Heavy Industries & Public Sector Enterprises |
| 2018 | Appointed Leader of Shiv Sena Party |

== See also ==
- First Modi ministry

Lok Sabha
| Preceded by Govindrao Nikam | Member of Parliament for Ratnagiri; 1996 – 2009 | Succeeded by Nilesh Rane; Constituency merged with Ratnagiri–Sindhudurg |
| Preceded by A. R. Antulay; Constituency created from Kolaba | Member of Parliament for Raigad; 2009 – Present | Succeeded by Incumbent |
Political offices
| Preceded by Suresh Prabhu | Minister of Power; 26 August 2002 – 21 May 2004 | Succeeded by Sushilkumar Shinde |
| Preceded by Praful Patel | Minister of Heavy Industries and Public Enterprises; 26 May 2014 – Present | Succeeded by Incumbent |
Party political offices
| Preceded by Himself | Leader of the Shiv Sena in the Lok Sabha; 2014–2023 | Succeeded by Rahul Shewale |
