= Raigad Lok Sabha constituency =

Lok Sabha constituency in Maharashtra

Coordinates: 18.2°N 73.4°E

Raigad
- Lok Sabha constituency
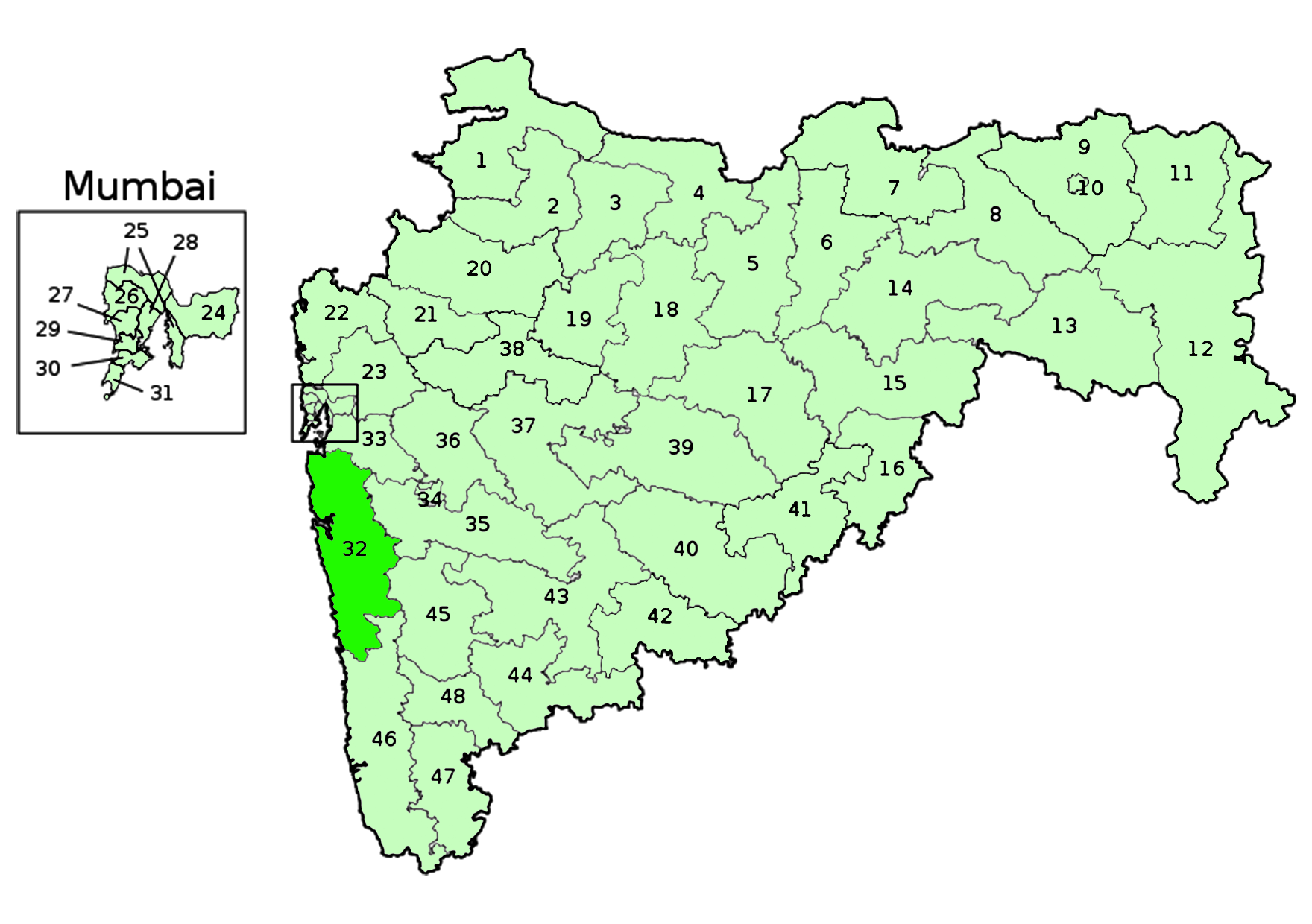
- Raigad Lok Sabha Constituency map

Constituency details
- Country: India
- Region: Western India
- State: Maharashtra
- Assembly constituencies: Pen; Alibag; Shrivardhan; Mahad; Dapoli; Guhagar
- Established: 2008
- Total electors: 16,68,372 (2024)
- Reservation: None

Member of Parliament
- 18th Lok Sabha
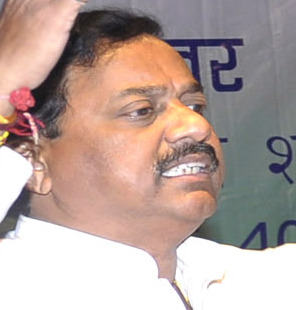
- Incumbent Sunil Tatkare
- Party: NCP
- Alliance: NDA
- Elected year: 2024
- Preceded by: Anant Geete

Raigad is one of the 48 Lok Sabha (lower house of Indian parliament) constituencies of Maharashtra state in western India. It is a new constituency, created in 2008 as a part of the implementation of the delimitation of the parliamentary constituencies based on the recommendations of the Delimitation Commission of India constituted on 12 July 2002. The constituency first held elections in 2009 and its first member of parliament was Anant Geete of Shiv Sena who was also re-elected in the 2014 elections. In the 2019 General Elections Sunil Tatkare of NCP won the seat by margin of 31,438 votes defeating the incumbent Geetee who was also a Union Cabinet minister.In the 2024 General Elections, Tatkare won reelection by margin of 82,784 votes as an NDA candidate.

== History ==
Raigad was historically called Kolaba, and was the capital of the Maratha origin Indian king Chhatrapati Shivaji.

== Assembly segments ==
At present, Raigad Lok Sabha constituency comprises six Vidhan Sabha (legislative assembly) segments in 2 district's. These segments are:

| # | Name | District | Member | Party | Leading (in 2024) |
|---|---|---|---|---|---|
| 191 | Pen | Raigad | Ravisheth Patil | BJP | NCP |
| 192 | Alibag | Raigad | Mahendrasheth Dalvi | SHS | NCP |
| 193 | Shrivardhan | Raigad | Aditi Tatkare | NCP | NCP |
| 194 | Mahad | Raigad | Bharatsheth Gogawale | SHS | NCP |
| 263 | Dapoli | Ratnagiri | Yogesh Kadam | SHS | SS(UBT) |
| 264 | Guhagar | Ratnagiri | Bhaskar Jadhav | SS(UBT) | SS(UBT) |

Pen, Alibag and Shrivardhan Vidhan Sabha segments were earlier part of the former Kolaba Lok Sabha constituency. Mahad was earlier part of the Ratnagiri Lok Sabha Constituency.

== Members of Parliament ==
| Year | Name | Party |
|---|---|---|
Before 2008 : See Kolaba
| 2009 | Anant Geete | Shiv Sena |
| 2014 | Anant Geete | Shiv Sena |
| 2019 | Sunil Tatkare | Nationalist Congress Party |
| 2024 | Sunil Tatkare | Nationalist Congress Party |

== Election results ==
=== 2024 ===
2024 Indian general elections: Raigad
| Party | Candidate | Votes | % | ±% |
|---|---|---|---|---|
| NCP | Sunil Tatkare | 508,352 | 50.17 | ▲2.68 |
| SS(UBT) | Anant Geete | 4,25,568 | 42.00 | New |
| VBA | Kumudini Ravindra Chavan | 19,618 | 1.90 | |
| IND. | Shrinivas Mattaparti | 9,394 | 0.90 | |
| NOTA | None of the Above | 27,270 | 2.69 | ▲1.57 |
| Majority | | 82,784 | 8.17 | ▲5.13 |
| Turnout | | 10,15,216 | 60.80 | ▼1.44 |
| NCP hold | | Swing | | |

=== 2019 ===
2019 Indian general elections: Raigad
| Party | Candidate | Votes | % | ±% |
|---|---|---|---|---|
| NCP | Sunil Tatkare | 486,968 | 47.49 | |
| SS | Anant Geete | 4,55,530 | 44.42 | |
| VBA | Suman Koli | 23,196 | 2.26 | |
| IND. | Subhash Janardan Patil | 12,265 | 1.20 | |
| NOTA | None of the Above | 11,490 | 1.12 | −0.94 |
| Majority | | 31,438 | | |
| Turnout | | 10,27,583 | 62.17 | −2.27 |
| NCP gain from SS | | Swing | | |

=== General election 2014 ===
2014 Indian general elections: Raigad
| Party | Candidate | Votes | % | ±% |
|---|---|---|---|---|
| SS | Anant Geete | 396,178 | 40.11 | −13.78 |
| NCP | Sunil Tatkare | 3,94,068 | 39.89 | N/A |
| PWPI | Bhai Ramesh Kadam | 1,29,730 | 13.13 | N/A |
| NOTA | None of the Above | 20,362 | 2.06 | N/A |
| Margin of victory | | 2,110 | 0.22 | −18.87 |
| Turnout | | 9,87,766 | 64.44 | +8.01 |
| SS gain from NCP | | Swing | -13.79 | |

=== General election 2009 ===
2009 Indian general elections: Raigad
| Party | Candidate | Votes | % | ±% |
|---|---|---|---|---|
| SS | Anant Geete | 413,546 | 53.89 | |
| INC | A. R. Antulay | 2,67,025 | 34.80 | |
| Independent | Pravin Thakur | 39,159 | 5.10 | |
| Independent | Sunil Naik | 22,200 | 2.89 | |
| Margin of victory | | 1,46,521 | 19.09 | |
| Turnout | | 7,67,366 | 56.43 | |
| SS gain from INC | | Swing | | |

== See also ==
- Kolaba Lok Sabha constituency
- List of constituencies of the Maharashtra Legislative Assembly
- List of constituencies of the Lok Sabha
- Raigad district
- Ratnagiri district
- Ratnagiri Lok Sabha constituency
