= Parulekar =

Parulekar is a Marathi surname. Notable people with the surname include:

- Bapusaheb Parulekar (born 1929), Indian politician
- Dilip Parulekar, Indian politician
- Godavari Parulekar (1907–1996), freedom fighter, writer, and social activist
- Nanasaheb Parulekar (1898–1973), Indian journalist
