= Nanasaheb Kunte =

Indian politician

Dattatraya Kashinath Kunte Nanasaheb

Personal details
- Born: 27 October 1908 Alibag
- Died: 1991 (aged 82–83) Bombay
- Spouse: Vimalabai (Biwalkar) Kunte (m. 1935)
- Children: 3 daughters

Dattatraya Kashinath Kunte, also known as Nanasaheb Kunte (1908–1991), was an Indian independence activist, a former Member of the Bombay Legislative Assembly and the 4th Lok Sabha. He was born at Alibag in 1908 and died in Bombay in 1991.

== Early life and family ==
He was born on 27 October 1908 the son of Alibag lawyer Kashinath Vaman Kunte (1880–1951) and his first wife. His mother died when he was eight. His early education was at Alibag, Kulaba district (now Raigad). He attended Wilson College at the University of Bombay where he received his B.A. in 1928. In 1930, he stood first in the university's LLB examination and was awarded the Justice Davar Gold medal.

In 1935, he married Vimal Biwalkar, a descendant of Ramji Mahadev Biwalkar. They have 3 daughters, Sunanda, Usha and Asha.

His younger brother, Prabhakar Kashinath Kunte was also a state legislator, minister, politician and public servant.

== Political activities ==
Nana joined the Indian National Congress in 1930, participating in the Civil Disobedience Movement of 1930, and all subsequent Indian Independence activities, including the Quit India movement in 1942. He was imprisoned several times by British regime.

In 1937, he was elected to the Bombay Legislative Assembly from a multi-member constituency in Kulaba district of the Bombay Presidency. He was re-elected to the Bombay Legislative Assembly in 1946 and 1952. In 1946 he became part of the ministry of B. G. Kher serving as Parliamentary Secretary. In 1952, he was elected Speaker of the Bombay Legislative Assembly. He was sympathetic to the cause of Samyukta Maharashtra and was active in the 1956 negotiations with the Samyunkta Maharashtra Samiti. He resigned the Speakership in protest against the Congress-run Central Government's decision not to create a Marathi-speaking state of Maharashtra in 1956, which however did come to fruition in 1960.

In 1961 he was appointed Chairman of the Maharashtra Housing Board.

He later left the Congress Party and contested the 1967 elections for the 4th Lok Sabha from the Kolaba constituency (now defunct; most parts now in the Raigad Lok Sabha constituency) and was elected as an Independent candidate with the support of the Peasants and Workers Party of India (PWP). In Parliament he served as a member of the Public Accounts Committee.

He was an advocate of Opposition unity and participated in the formation of the Bharatiya Kranti Dal and served as the party's General Secretary. He was also nominated as Chairman, Bennett, Coleman, and Company and was instrumental in steering the company through two major press strikes in 1968 while returning it to profitability.

In 1971 he was defeated in the Lok Sabha elections. Subsequently, he retired from active politics. In 1973 he moved to Pune after having resided in Bombay since 1946. He continued his social and educational activities. He actively canvassed for the newly formed Janata Party in the 1977 but refused the nomination for a parliamentary seat.

His autobiography "Vaatchaal" (in Marathi) was published in 1987.

== Development and social activities ==
He was the founder Chairman of the Bombay Khar Lands board, which actively assisted farmers in making productive saline land close to the sea front. He spearheaded the "Kul Kayda" whereby tillers of the soil were able to possess the land they farmed.

He was a founder of the Janata Shikshan Mandal which operates several educational institutions in and near Alibag, including JSM College.

He was one of the earliest advocates of the Konkan Railway, and was successful in gaining the support of Lal Bahadur Shastri when Shastri was the Minister of Railways. Shastri subsequently had a brief stint as Prime Minister but the project languished until it was revived in the 1990s.

He was a Vice Chairman of the Asiatic Society of Bombay.

Preceded by unknown	Speaker, Bombay Legislative Assembly; 1952-1956	Succeeded by unknown
Preceded by unknown	Chairman, Bombay Housing Board; 1961-1963	Succeeded by unknown
Preceded by Bhaskar Narayan Dighe	Lok Sabha Member from Kolaba constituency 1967-1971	Succeeded by Sawant Shankar Babaji
Preceded by unknown	Chairman, Benett, Coleman & Company; 1968-1970	Succeeded by unknown
