= Govindrao Nikam =

Indian politician

Member of Parliament, Lok Sabha
- In office 1989-1996
- Preceded by: Husen Dalwai
- Succeeded by: Anant Geete
- Constituency: Ratnagiri, Maharashtra

Personal details
- Born: 16 January 1935 Sawarde, Ratnagiri, Bombay Presidency, British India
- Died: 24 January 2008 (aged 73)
- Party: Indian National Congress
- Spouse: Anuradha

Govindrao Nikam was an Indian politician. He was elected to the Lok Sabha, the lower house of the Parliament of India as a member of the Indian National Congress.
