= Durgadi Fort =

Hill fort in Kalyan, Maharashtra, India

- Kalyan, Maharashtra, India
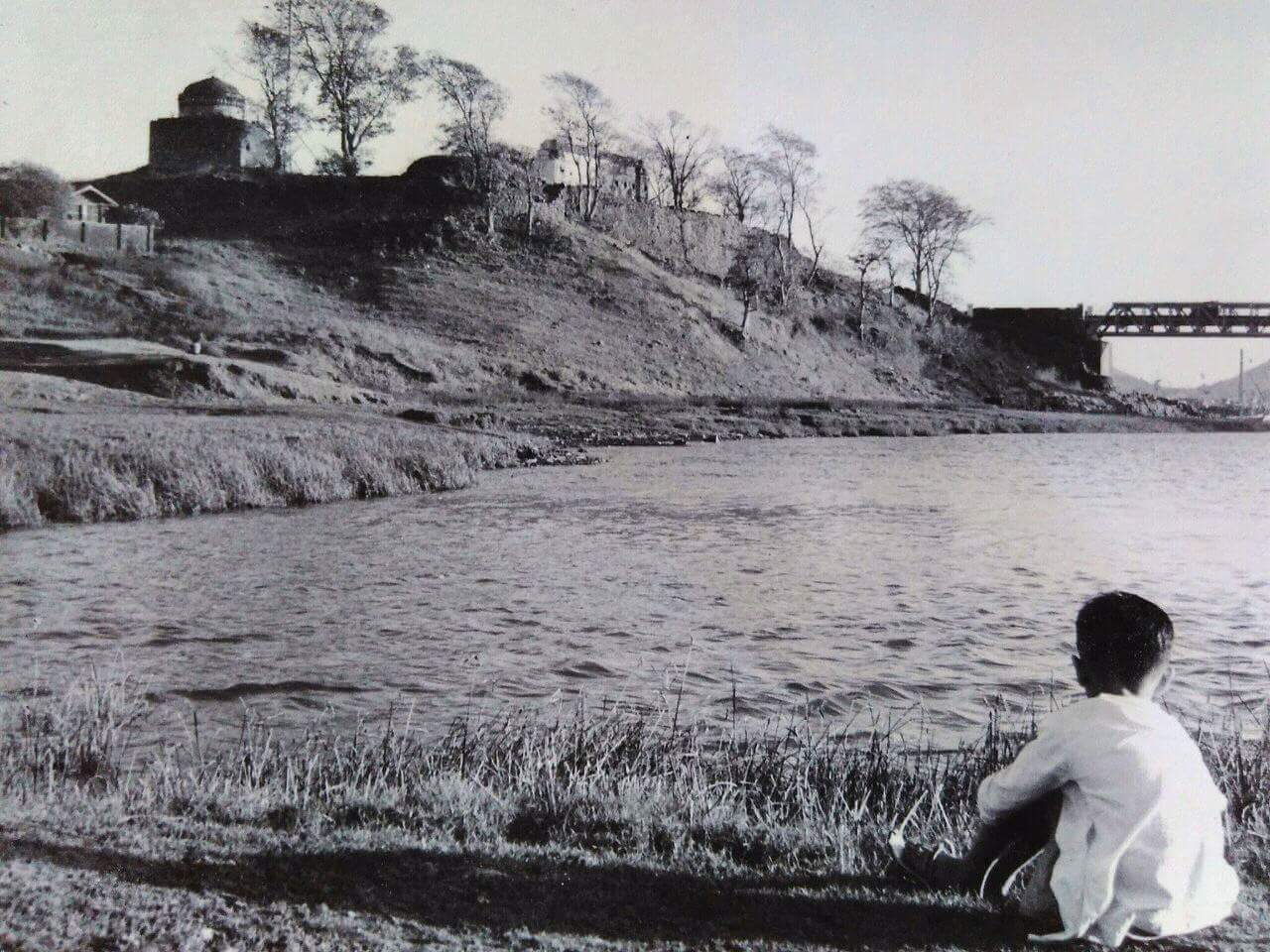
- Durgadi Fort in 1900's, (Right) Patri Pull Bridge, the oldest bridge in Kalyan

Site information
- Type: Hill Fort; Land battery
- Open to the public: Yes
- Condition: Under restoration

Location
- Coordinates: 19.2454°N 73.1186°E

Site history
- Built: 1694; 332 years ago

Durgadi Fort is a fort located in Kalyan, near Mumbai in Maharashtra, India.

The fort has a Hindu temple and a mosque at the top, which has religious significance for both Hindus and Muslims. The fort has witnessed riots in the past and is considered communally sensitive. A team of State Reserve Police Force personnel is deployed for security.

== History ==
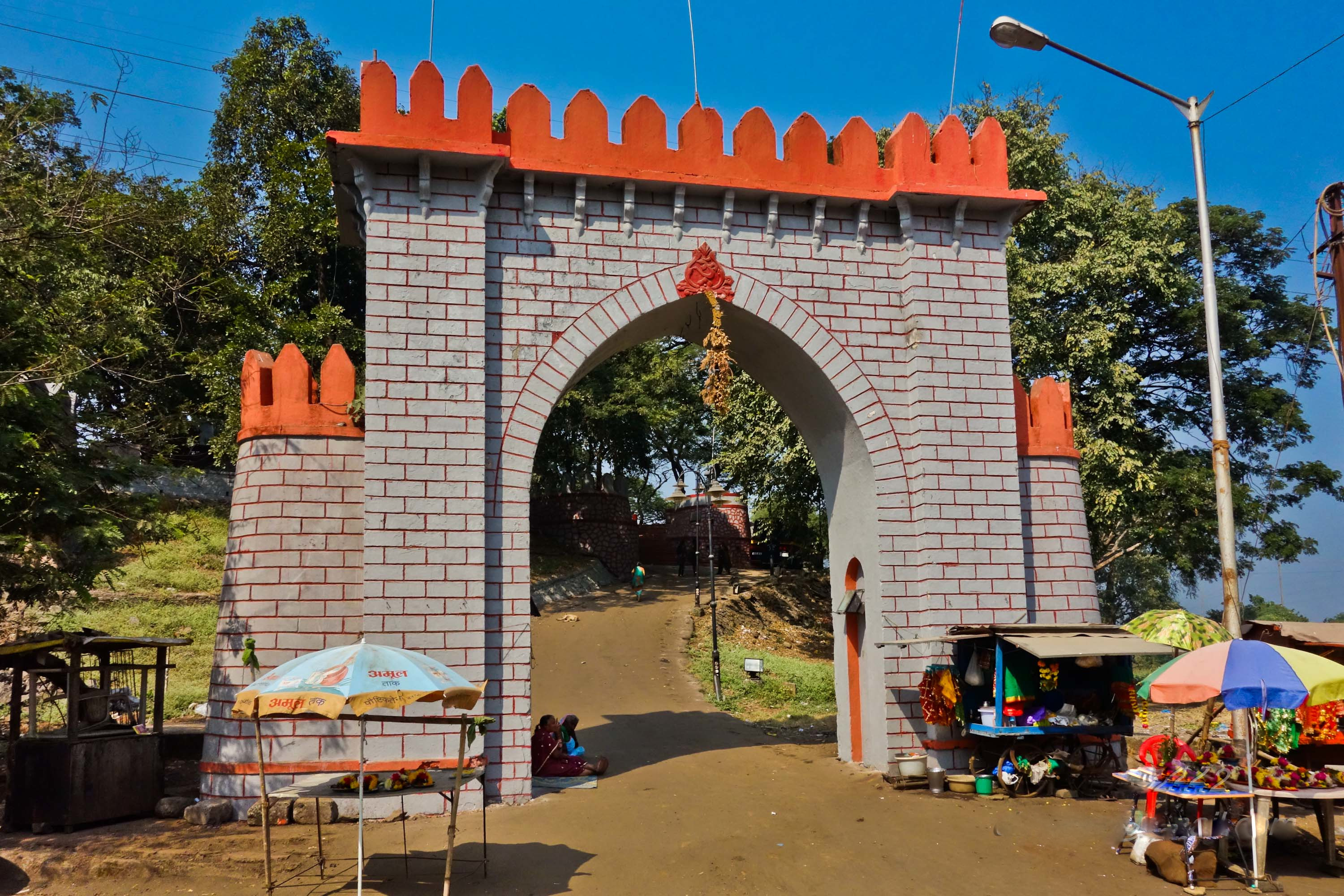
An entrance gate of the Durgadi Fort

The fort's construction started during Shah Jahan's reign and was completed in Aurangzeb's reign in 1694 AD. Durgadi Fort is built on a hill beside the Kalyan creek. The fort came under the Marathas when Chhatrapati Shivaji Maharaj captured Kalyan and Bhiwandi from Adilshah in 1654. Shivaji used it as a dock to build boats and ships. During the British Raj, stones from the fort wall were used to construct the Kalyan and Thane piers.

Under the rule of the Marathas, a new gate about, 150 feet to the south of the Ganesh Gate was opened near the mansion of Maratha General Ramji Mahadev Biwalkar. In the citadel of the fort, the Marathas built a small temple of the Hindu goddess Durga and named the fort Durgadi in honor of the goddess, a name it still bears. The original idol of the goddess Durga was stolen in 1876.

Shivaji used the fort as dock and began the work of the first Navy of Hindavi Swarajya and he hired 340 Portuguese artisans to build the naval docks. Later, the fort was repaired by Ramji Mahadev Biwalkar.

In 1682, Moghul Sardar Hasan Ali Khan captured the fort, later recaptured by Sambhaji, the second Chhatrapati of the Maratha Empire. However, the Moghuls took it over again in 1689. It later came under Peshwas. In 1728, the Portuguese attacked the fort but were repelled by Shankarji Keshav Phadke, a Peshwa commander.

The Kalyan Dombivli Municipal Corporation has built a new gate and made a garden around the fort.

== Fort Mosque ==
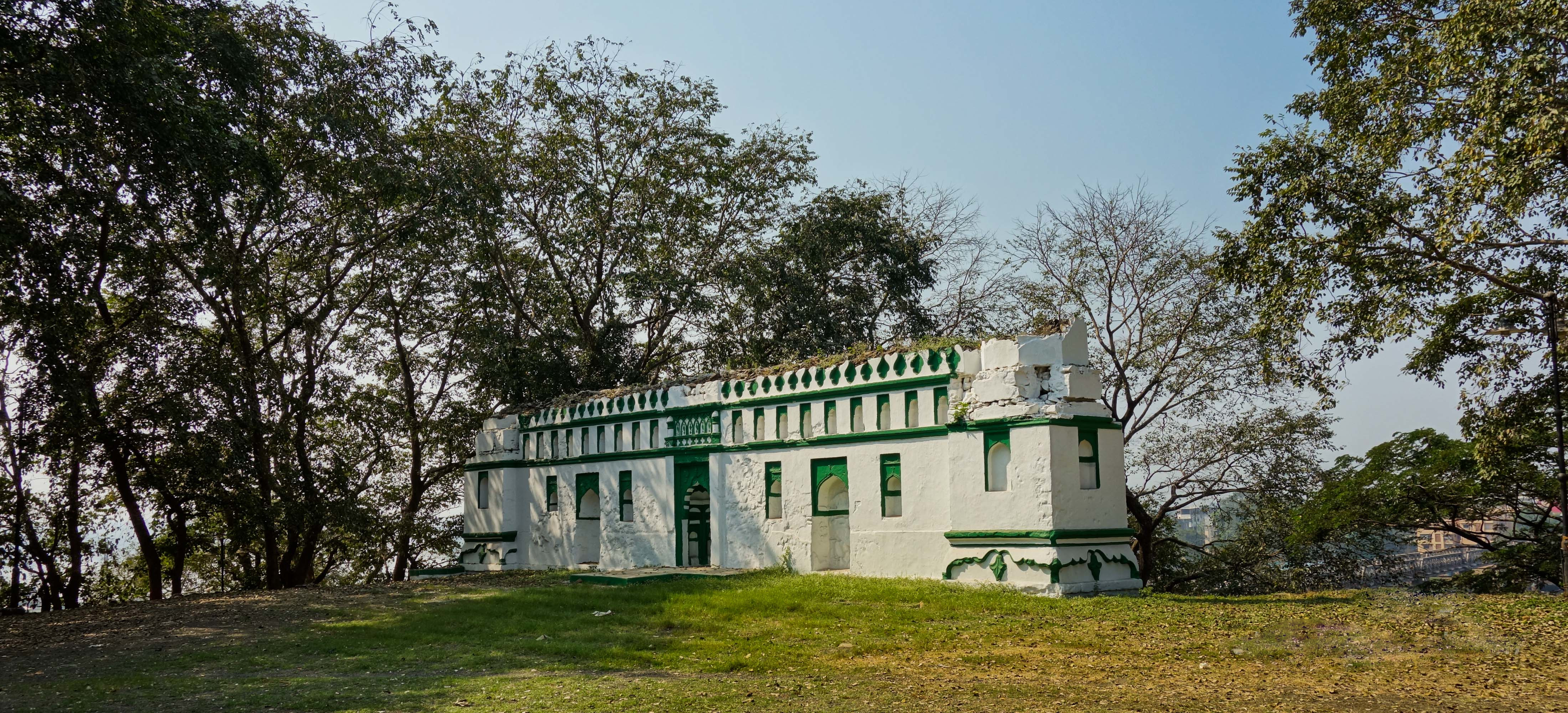
Fort mosque

The mosque is part of the original fort structure and was built for use by soldiers .Clear demarcation line exists separating the mosque and temple.

The mosque functions as an Eidgah. It's open to Eid prayers during Eid al-fitr and Eid al-Adha, the two holiest days in Islam. Eidgah activities are overseen by Majlis-E-Mushawarat Trust.

== Durgadi Temple ==
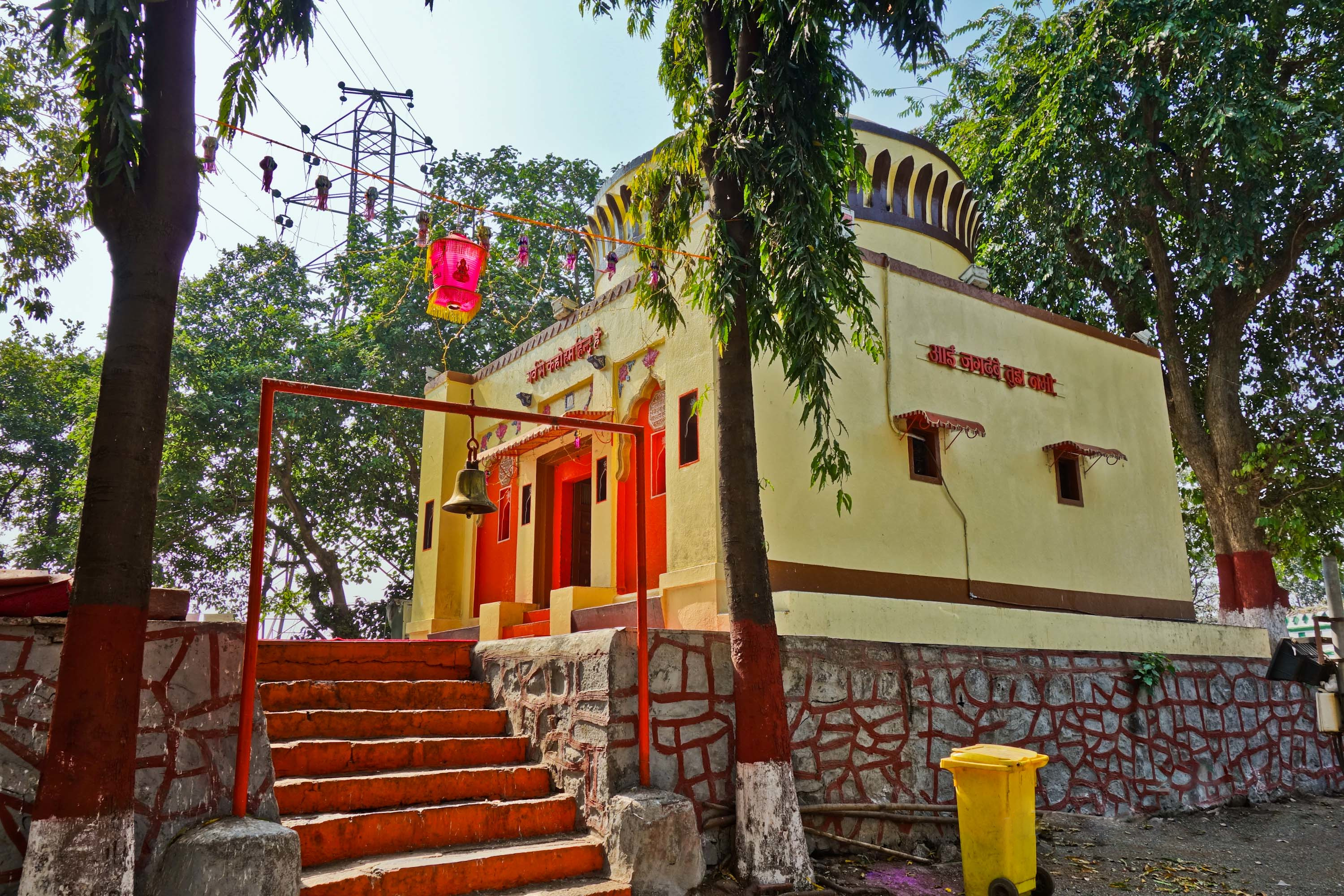
Durgadi Mata Temple on the fort

It is believed that Chatrapati Shivaji Maharaj himself built Durgadi Temple, dedicated to the Hindu goddess Durga on Durgadi fort. The Shiv Sena chief Bal Thackeray had started the Navaratri celebrations at the temple, which still continues. On the occasion of the Navratri, the temple is visited by devotees from Mumbai, Thane, Raigad and Palghar districts.

In 2018, the temple was visited by about 7 lakh devotees during the Navratri festival.

=== 1967 Communal tension ===
In 1967, a communal tension arose in Kalyan over the temple on Durgadi Fort, on which both Hindu and Muslim community had their claims. The Muslims had been using the mosque as Eidgah since the early days of the fort; local Hindus believed the shrine atop the fort was that of Hindu goddess Durga and started worshipping near the mosque. When Shiv Sena supremo Bal Thackeray got to know about the matter, he declared that Shiv Sena would unfurl the saffron flag atop the Durgadi Fort on 8 September 1967. Then the Navratri festival came, and Chief Minister Vasantrao Phulsing Naik announced a ban on the puja at the Durgadi temple. Still, despite the ban, Shiv Sena workers and Theckeray defied the ban and performed the Puja and religious ceremony at the shrine.

== Photogallery ==
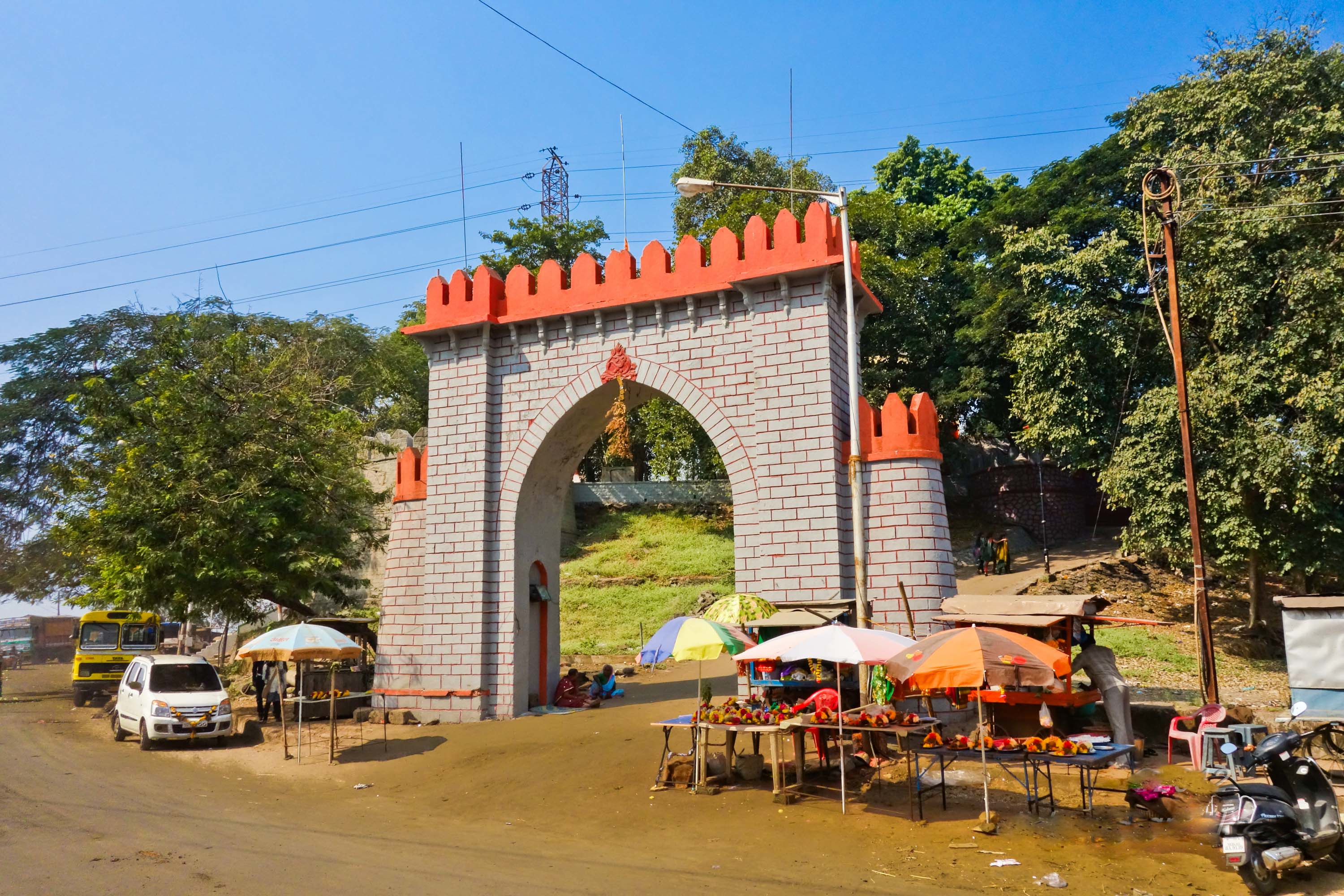
Durgadi Fort

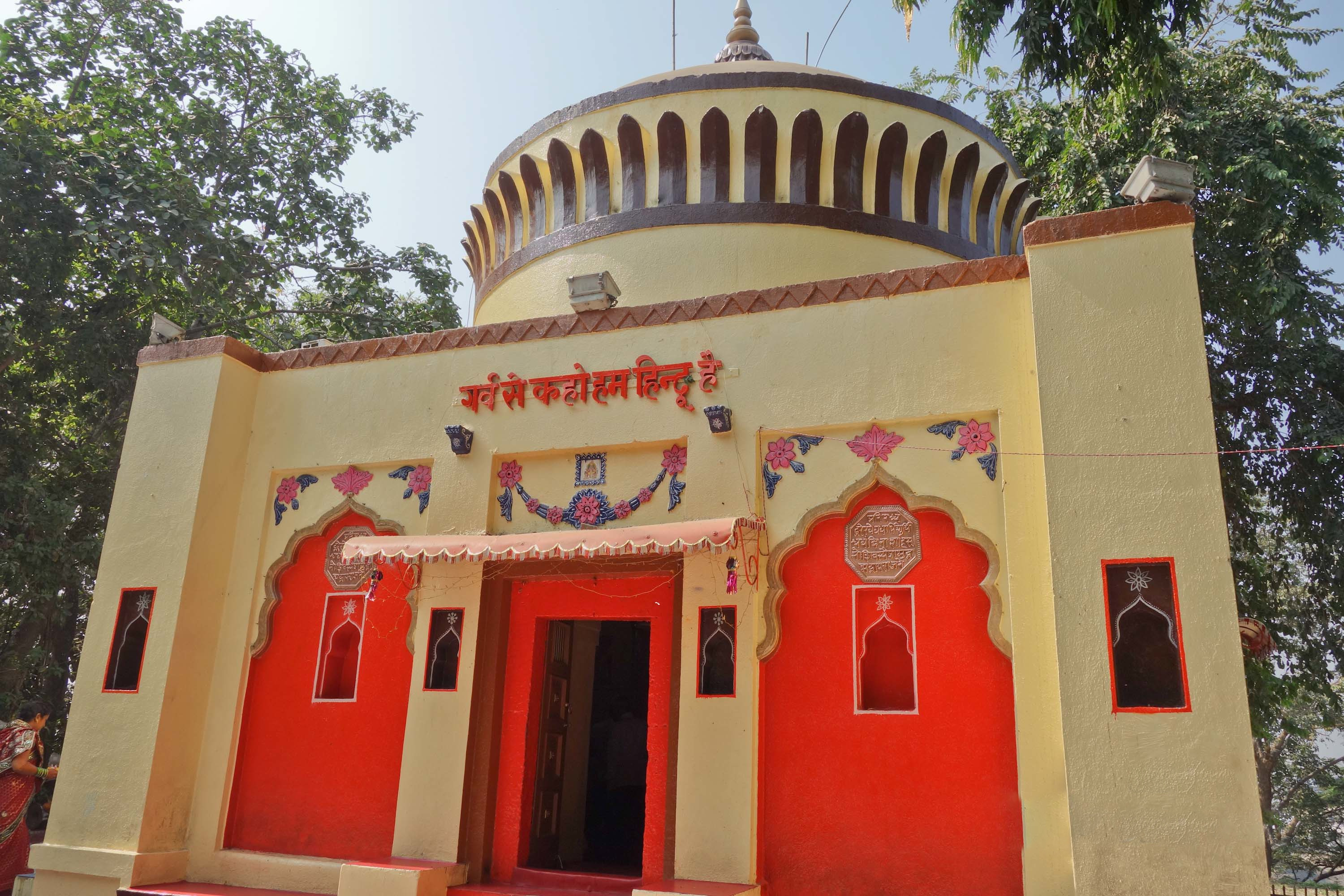
Durgadi Mata Temple on the fort

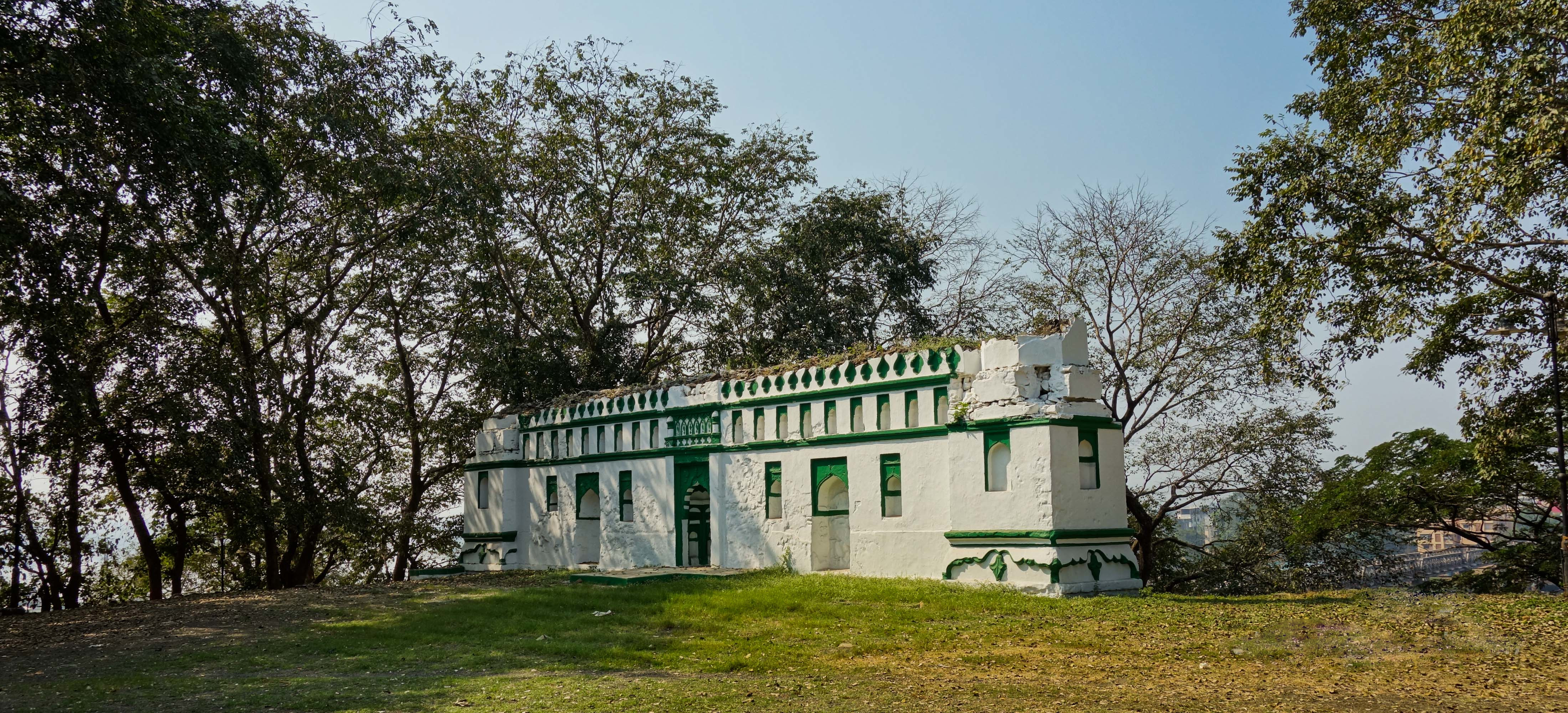
A mosque on the fort

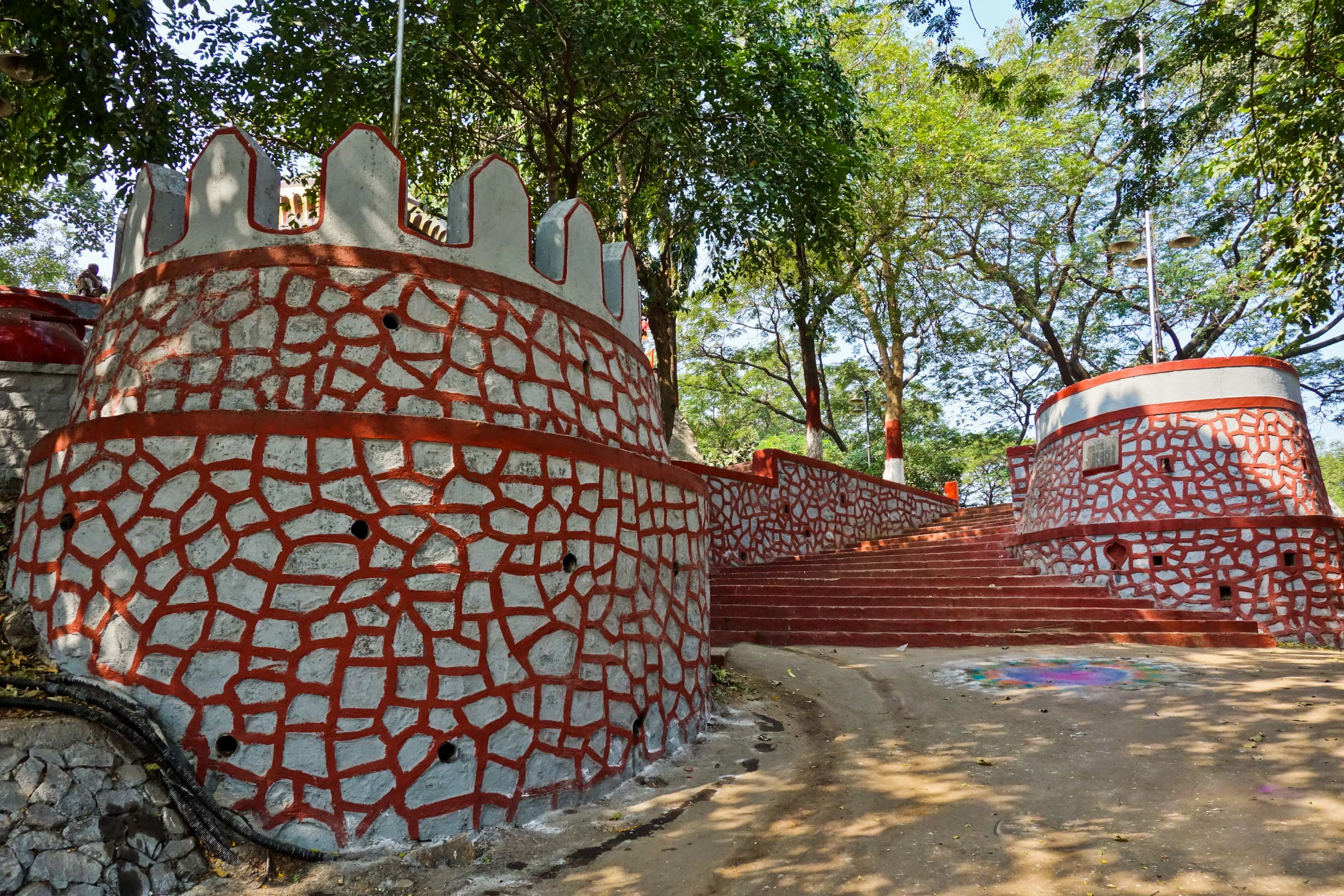
Durgadi Fort

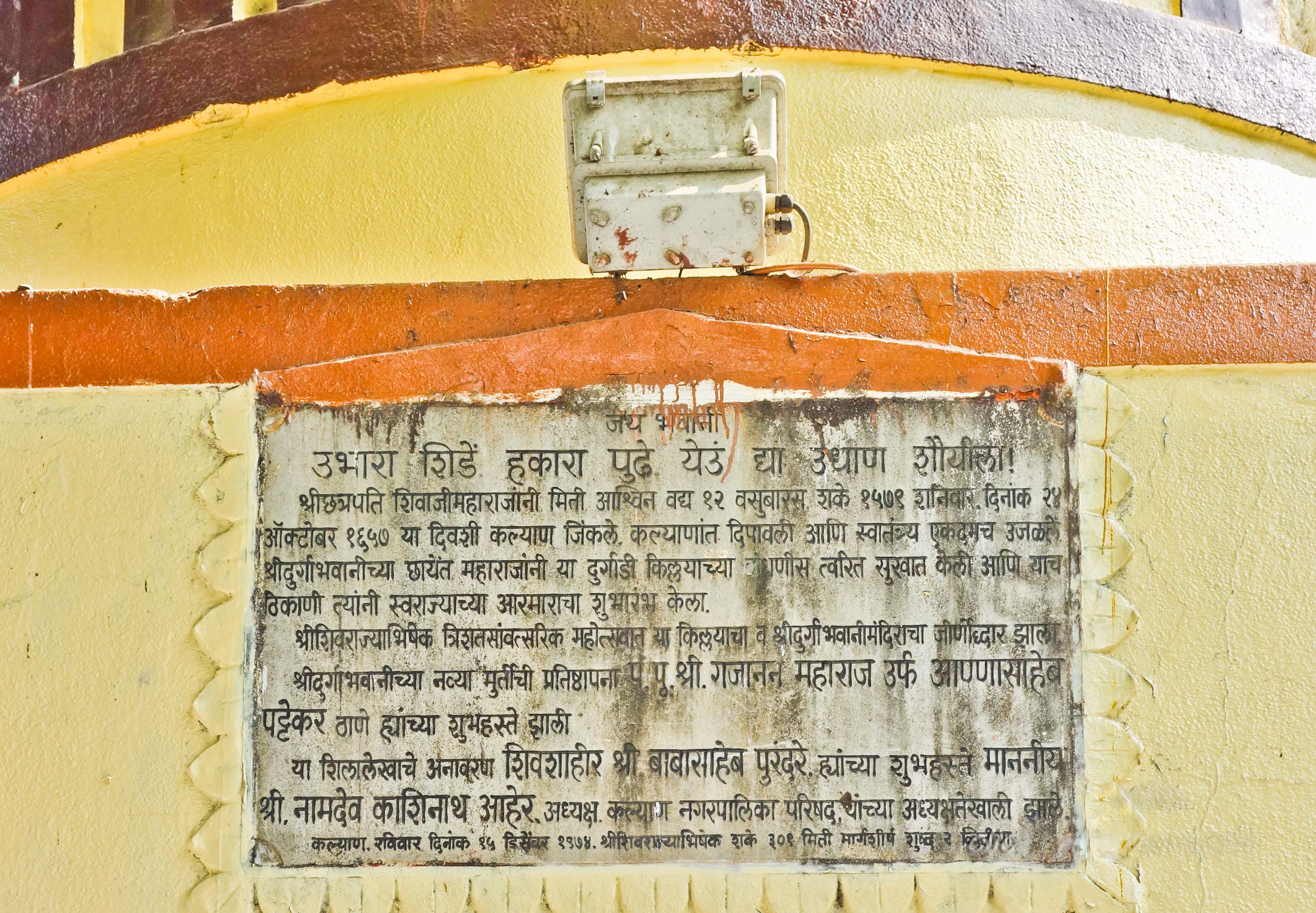
Durgadi Fort

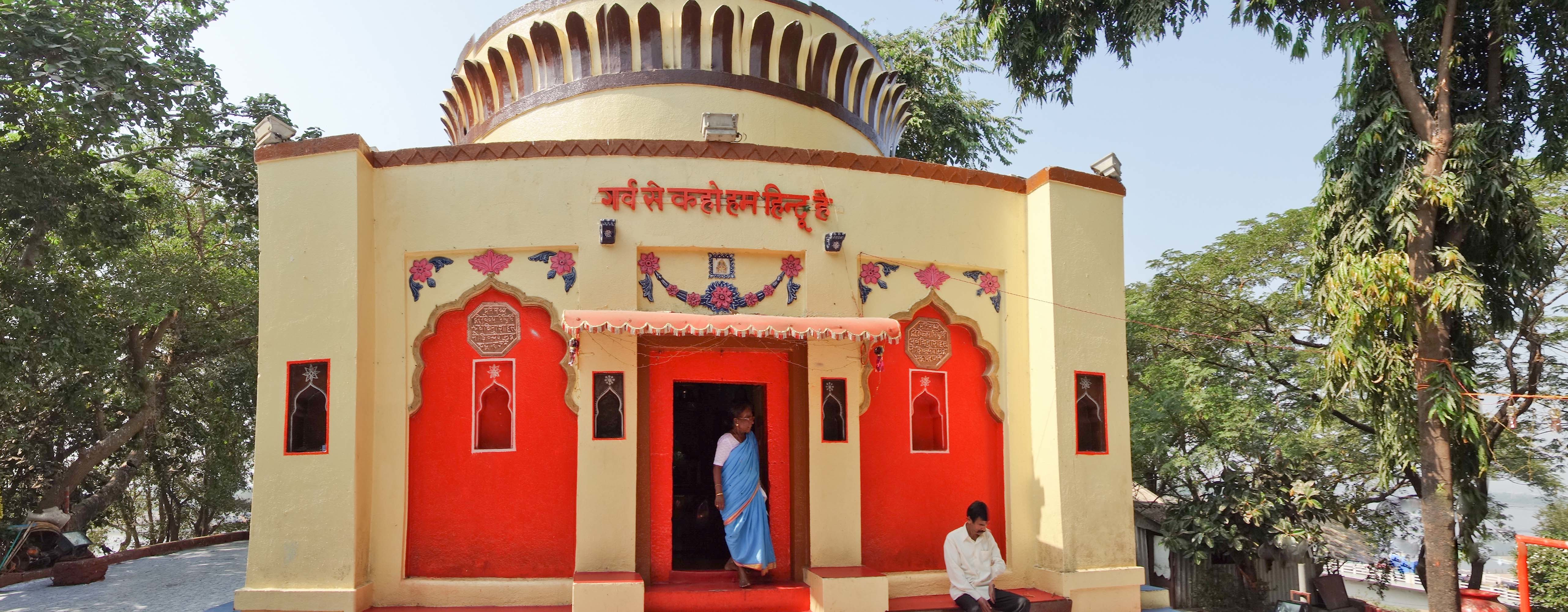
Durgadi Mata Temple on the fort
