= Kolaba Lok Sabha constituency =

Constituency of the Indian parliament in Maharashtra

Coordinates: 18.6°N 72.9°E

Kolaba
- Former Lok Sabha constituency

Constituency details
- Country: India
- Region: Western India
- State: Maharashtra
- Assembly constituencies: Pen; Alibag; Shrivardhan; Mahad
- Established: 1951
- Abolished: 2009

Kolaba Lok Sabha constituency was a Lok Sabha (parliamentary) constituency in Maharashtra state in western India till 2008. The area which comprised this erstwhile constituency was part of Raigad district.

== Assembly segments ==
Kolaba Lok Sabha constituency comprised the following six Vidhan Sabha (legislative assembly) segments:

1. Shriwardhan
2. Mahad
3. Pen
4. Alibag
5. Panvel
6. Khalapur

== Members of Parliament ==
Year	Member	Party
1952	C. D. Deshmukh	Indian National Congress
1957	Rajaram Balkrishna Raut	Peasants and Workers Party of India
1962	Bhaskar Narayan Dighe	Indian National Congress
1967	Nanasaheb Kunte	Independent
1971	Shankarrao Savant	Indian National Congress
1977	Dinkar Patil	Peasants and Workers Party of India
1980	A.T. Patil	Indian National Congress
1984	Dinkar Patil	Peasants and Workers Party of India
1989	Abdul Rahman Antulay	Indian National Congress
1991	Abdul Rahman Antulay	Indian National Congress
1996	Abdul Rahman Antulay	Indian National Congress
1998	Ramsheth Thakur	Peasants and Workers Party of India
1999	Ramsheth Thakur	Peasants and Workers Party of India
2004	Abdul Rahman Antulay	Indian National Congress
2009 onwards : See Raigad Lok Sabha constituency

== Election results ==
=== 2004 ===
2004 Indian general elections: Kolaba
Party	Candidate	Votes	%	±%
INC	Abdul Rahman Antulay	312,225	39.35	
PWPI	Vivek Patil	280,355	35.33	−6.22
SS	Shyam Sawant	164,242	20.73	−14.33
BSP	Kundlik Thore	12,852	1.62	
Majority		31,870	4.02	
Turnout		793,620	63.48	+2.01
INC gain from PWPI		Swing		

== See also ==
- Raigad district
- Raigad Lok Sabha constituency
- List of former constituencies of the Lok Sabha
