= Datta Narayan Patil =

Indian politician

Datta Narayan Patil (also known as Dattatray Patil) was an Indian politician who served as 11th Leader of the Opposition in the Maharashtra Legislative Assembly two times from 27 November 1987 to 22 December 1988 and 20 October 1989 to 3 March 1990.

== Personal life ==
He died in 2011 at the age of 84. His niece Meenakshi Patil served as Member of the Legislative Assembly from Alibag Assembly constituency.

== Electoral performance ==
| Election | Constituency | Party | Result | Votes % | Opposition Candidate | Opposition Party | Opposition vote % | Ref |
|---|---|---|---|---|---|---|---|---|
| 1995 | Alibag | Independent | Lost | 1.50% | Meenakshi Patil | PWPI | 45.03% | |
| 1985 | Alibag | PWPI | Won | 71.08% | A. G. (Ravi) Patil | INC | 28.92% | |
| 1978 | Alibag | PWPI | Won | 48.22% | Khanvilkar Datajirao Krishnanarao | INC | 29.97% | |
| 1967 | Alibag | PWPI | Won | 50.65% | Khanvilkar Datajirao Krishnanarao | INC | 45.23% | |
| 1962 | Alibag | PWPI | Lost | 36.98% | Khanvilkar Datajirao Krishnanarao | INC | 51.41% | |
| 1957 | Alibag | PWPI | Won | 67.08% | Bhide Manorambal Purushottam | INC | 32.92% | |
