= Varadvinayak =

Ashtavinayak temple of the Hindu deity Ganesha

Religion
- Affiliation: Hinduism
- District: Raigad district
- Deity: Lord Ashtavinayak

Location
- Location: Mahad village situated in Khalapur taluka near Karjat and Khopoli
- State: Maharashtra
- Country: India
- Interactive map of Varadvinayak

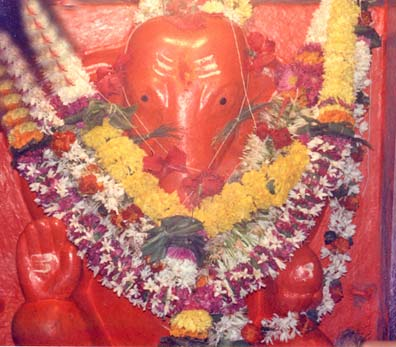
Shri Varada Vinayak, Mahad

Varadvinayak, also spelt as Varadavinayaka, is one of the Ashtavinayak temples of the Hindu deity Ganesha. It is located in Mahad village situated in Khalapur taluka near Karjat and Khopoli of Raigad District, Maharashtra, India. The temple was built (restored) by Peshwa General Ramji Mahadev Biwalkar in 1725AD.

== Legend ==
Legend has it that the childless king, Bhima of Koudinyapur and his wife met the sage Vishwamitra while they had come to forest for penance. Vishwamitra gave the king a mantra (incantation) Ekashar Gajana Mantra to chant and thus his son and heir, prince Rukmaganda was born. Rukmaganda grew up into a beautiful young prince.

One day, on a hunting trip Rukmaganda stopped at the hermitage of Rishi Vachaknavi. The Rishi's wife, Mukunda, fell in love at the sight of the handsome prince and asked him to fulfill her desires. The virtuous prince flatly refused and left the ashram. Mukunda became very lovesick. Knowing her plight, King Indra took the form of Rukmaganda and had sex with her. Mukunda became pregnant and gave birth to a son Gritsamada.

In time, when Gritsamada learned of the circumstances of his birth, he cursed his mother to become the unattractive, thorny berry-bearing "Bhor" plant. Mukunda in turn cursed Gritsamada, that a cruel rakshas (demon) will be born from him. Suddenly they both heard a heavenly voice saying, "Gritsamada is the son of Indra", leaving them both shocked, but too late to alter their respective curses. Mukunda was transformed into the Bhor plant. Gritsamada, ashamed and penitent, retreated to the Pushpak forest where he prayed for a reprieve to Lord Ganesh (Ganapati).

Lord Ganesha was pleased by Gritsamada's penance and offered him a boon that he will bear a son who would not be defeated by anybody other than Shankara (Shiva). Gritsamada asks Ganesh to bless the forest, so that any devotees who pray here will be successful, and also urged Ganesha to stay there permanently and asked for knowledge of Brahma. Gritsamada built a temple there and the Ganesha idol installed there is called Varadavinayaka. Today the forest is known as Bhadraka.

It is said that if the coconut received as prasad during Maghi Chaturthi is consumed, one will be blessed with a son. Hence the temple is especially full with devotees during Maghi Utsav.

== The temple ==
The idol of this temple Varada Vinayak is a swayambu (self originated) and was found in the adjoining lake in an immersed position in 1690 AD. This temple is said to be built in 1725AD by Subhedar Ramji Mahadev Biwalkar. The temple premises are on one side of a beautiful pond. The idol of this temple faces the east and has his trunk turned to the left. There is an oil lamp in this shrine which is said to be burning continuously since 1892. This temple also has the idol of Mushika, Navagraha Devatas and Shivalinga. There are 4 elephant idols guarding the 4 sides of the temple. In this Ashta Vinayak Temple devotees can enter the Garbhagriha and pay their homage and respects to the idol personally. Devotees visit the Varadvinayak shrine throughout the year. During festivals like the Magha Chaturthi huge crowds can be seen in this temple.

== See also ==
- Ashtavinayaka
