= Bapusaheb Parulekar =

Indian politician (1929–2023)

Member of Parliament, Lok Sabha
- In office 1977–1984
- Preceded by: Shantaram Peje
- Succeeded by: Husen Dalwai
- Constituency: Ratnagiri

Personal details
- Born: Chandrakant Parulekar; 2 July 1929 Bandra, Bombay, Bombay Presidency, British India
- Died: 27 July 2023 (aged 94) Ratnagiri, Maharashtra, India
- Party: Bharatiya Janata Party (1980–2023)
- Other political affiliations: Janata Party (1977–1980); Bharatiya Jan Sangh (1952–1977)
- Spouse: Neela Parulekar (m. 1951)
- Children: 4 sons
- Parent: Kashinath Laxman Parulekar (father)
- Education: Bachelor of Law
- Profession: Advocate, Politician

Bapusaheb Parulekar (2 July 1929 – 27 July 2023) was an Indian politician who was a member of the 6th Lok Sabha and 7th Lok Sabha. His real name was Chandrakant Parulekar, but he was better known by the honorific 'Bapusaheb'. He represented the Ratnagiri constituency of Maharashtra, winning the election in 1977 and 1980, and was a member of the Jan Sangh until 1977, when it merged with Janata Party.

Parulekar died on 27 July 2023, at the age of 94.
