= Meenakshi Patil =

Indian politician (1947–2024)

Meenakshi Patil (1947 – 29 March 2024) was an Indian politician who served as Member of Maharashtra Legislative Assembly from Alibag Assembly constituency from 1995 to 1999, 1999 to 2004 and 2009 to 2014.

== Personal life and death ==
Patil was born in 1947, and died on 29 March 2024, at the age of 76. She was the niece of Datta Narayan Patil, former opposition leader. She was from the Peasants and Workers Party of India.
