= Figght =

2019 Indian Marathi language film

- Directed by: Jimmy Morey
- Screenplay by: Swapnil Mahaling
- Story by: Swapnil Mahaling
- Produced by: Lalit Oswaal
- Starring: Jeet More; Suresh Vishwakarma; Purva Shinde; Anup Ingale; Madhav Abhyankar; Nishigandha Kunte
- Cinematography: Suneel Borkar; Nishant Bhagwat
- Edited by: Shashank Shah
- Production company: Future X Production
- Release date: 11 January 2019
- Country: India
- Language: Marathi

Figght is a 2019 Indian Marathi-language action romance film directed by Jimmy Moray, edited by Shashank Shah and written by Swapnil Mahaling. It is produced by Lalit Oswaal under the banner of Future X Production. The film stars Jeet More while featuring Suresh Vishwakarma, Purva Shinde, Anup Ingale and Madhav Abhyankar. Figght was released in India on 11 January 2019.

== Plot ==
A young boy has an altercation with his father which results in the boy leaving the village of Satara, India. He encounters several members of a gang and a fight ensues, in which he impresses the gang's boss and is admitted into the gang. The boy is convinced to sell drugs, under the impression that he is selling Ayurvedic medicine (i.e.: traditional Hindu medicine). A boxing coach catches the attention of the young boy and attempts to train him to become a boxing champion.

== Cast ==
- Jeet More
- Suresh Vishwakarma
- Purva Shinde
- Anup Ingale
- Madhav Abhyankar
- Nishigandha Kunte
- Sayali Joshi
- Prasad Surve

== Music ==
The film's soundtrack was composed and produced by Swapnil Godbole with lyrics by Mandar Cholkar. The first song, "Kalana Kahi", was sung by Ajay Gogavale and released by Everest Marathi on 18 December 2018. The song "Bukkebaaz", a Marathi rap composed and written by Ray Marshall, J-Subodh and Mc Azad, was released on 2 January 2019.

Track listing
No.	Title	Singer(s)	Length
1	"Kalana Kahi"	Ajay Gogavale	3:27
2	"Bukkebaaz"	Ray Marshall, J-Subodh & Mc Azad	3:18

== Controversies ==
Followers of Udyanraje Bhosale objected to the use of the dialogue "साताऱ्यात माझंच चालतं" (I rule Satara) in the movie. The dialogue went viral and was featured on prominent news channels across Maharashtra. The vehicles of "Figght" crew members were damaged while on a promotional tour across Satara and posters were torn by protesters. Three protesters who were responsible for damaging vehicles and public property were arrested by the Satara Police. As the protest grew, the crew and director had to intervene. Jimmy Moray, director of Figght, stated that the movie is not against Udyanraje Bhosale and that the dialogue is an integral part of the story.
