= Nishigandha Kunte =

Indian actress, event anchor and artist (born 1994)

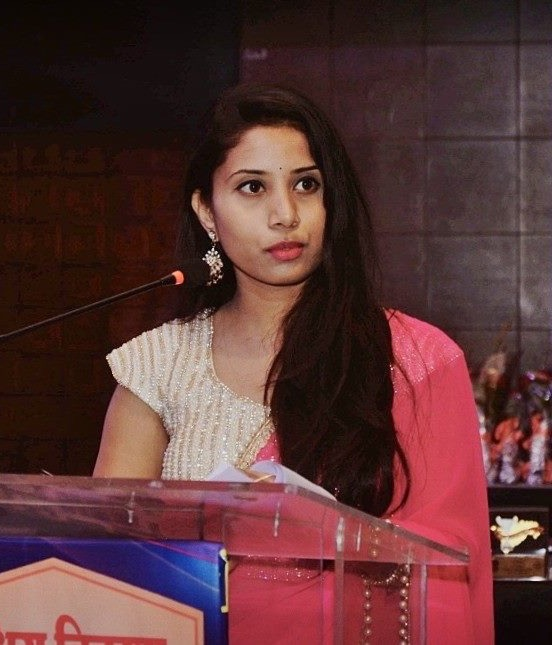
- Nishigandha at NSC Best Safety Practices Award 31 Oct 2015
- Born: 21 August 1997 (age 29); Pune, India
- Years active: 2013 – present
- Known for: Anchoring, actress (people)
- Parent(s): Suresh Kunte, Lata Kunte

Nishigandha Kunte (निशिगंधा कुंटे) is an Indian actress, event anchor and artist who has hosted several events and appeared in commercial advertisement as well as movies. Born in Pune, Nishigandha started her formal career as event anchoring since year 2014

== Career ==
Nishigandha started her anchoring carrier in 2014 since then she hosted several commercial and celebrity events. She made her Bollywood debut in 2015, with a cameo role in Deepika Padukone and Ranveer Singh starrer, Bajirao Mastani

She played sangeeta's character in FuttureXProduction's Figght produced by Lalit Oswaal and directed by Jimmy Moray, the film has been released in 2018

Vicheyam directed by Shree Gurunath Shree released on 23 April 2024 on OTT platforms, she played sub-inspector Kulkarni's character.
