= Prabhakar Kashinath Kunte =

Indian politician

Prabhakar Kashinath Kunte Aabasaheb

Personal details
- Born: 29 September 1922 Alibag
- Died: 15 August 2012 (aged 89) Mumbai
- Spouse: Varsha Kunte

Prabhakar Kashinath Kunte (29 September 1922 – 15 August 2012) was an Indian Freedom fighter and former Member of Legislator Assembly of Maharashtra. He was born at Alibag in 1920 and was a resident of Mumbai from 1939 till his death on 14 August 2012.

== Early life and family ==
He was born in 1920, the son of Alibag lawyer Kashinath Vaman Kunte and Godavari Kashinath Kunte. He died in Mumbai on 14 August 2012. He was survived by his wife, Varsha Kunte (d. July 23, 2019). Prabhakar & Varsha Kunte had no children. He was the younger brother of Nanasaheb Kunte (Dattatraya Kashinath Kunte) (1908–1991), veteran freedom fighter, Speaker of the Bombay Legislative Assembly (1952–1956), and member of the 4th Lok Sabha (1967–1971).

His early education was at Alibag, Kulaba district (now Raigad). He matriculated with distinction in English, Sanskrit, and History in 1939. His college education was at Bombay University.

== Political activities ==
Prabhakar Kunte he joined the Indian National Congress and was active in Quit India movement in 1942, and was imprisoned by British regime. He was a leading trade union leader and was elected to the Bombay Municipal corporation. He actively participated in the Samyukta Maharashtra agitation (1955–1960) and the liberation of Goa (1961).

During the Congress splits of 1969 and 1978 he supported the faction led by Indira Gandhi, Congress-R and Congress-I respectively. In 1972, he was elected to the Maharashtra State Legislative Assembly in 1972 from the Dharavi constituency of Bombay. Subsequently, he joined the ministry of Shankarrao Chavan as Minister of State for Housing. He subsequently narrowly lost the assembly election in 1978 from Dharavi. This seat was declared a "Reserved" constituency for the 1980 elections, so he shifted to Mahim where he was defeated by 5-time legislator, F.M. Pinto who contested as an Independent. P.K. Kunte was rumored to be one of Sanjay Gandhi's leading choices to be an "outsider" candidate for the Chief Ministership of Maharashtra, as part of his efforts to break up the monopoly of power then enjoyed by Western Maharashtra's sugar barons. Ironically, the Gandhis chose another Kulaba (Raigad) native, Abdul Rehman Antulay for the position.

In addition to his ministerial position, Kunte on YouTube served as chairman, Bombay Housing Board (BMRDA), the Maharashtra Housing and Area Development Board (MHADA) and the Khadi and Village Industries Commission (KVIC).

He also lost 1987 assembly election, this time from the Vile Parle seat in Mumbai, to Dr. Ramesh Y. Prabhoo of Shiv Sena. The formidable Shiv Sena founder and leader Bal Thackeray campaigned vigorously for Prabhoo on a Hindutva plank. Kunte filed a petition in the Bombay High Court, accusing Prabhoo of seeking votes on religious grounds and thereby indulging in electoral malpractices. Justice S P Bharucha of the high court declared Prabhoo's election void on 7 April 1989, for the commission of corrupt practices under Sections 123 (3) and 123 (3A) of the Representation of the People Act (RPA), 1951. However, Prabhoo served out his term in the legislature as the high court ruling was appealed to the Supreme Court of India.

Kunte was finally vindicated in 1996. In a landmark judgment (1996) 1 SCC 130, the Supreme Court upheld the lower court's verdict. and debarred Thackeray from contesting or voting in elections for a period of six years.

The Government of India however referred the matter to the Election Commission for its advice. The commission constituted a two-member bench comprising Chief Election Commissioner Manohar Singh Gill and Commissioner J M Lyngdoh to look into the matter. The bench sent its decision to the President on 22 September 1998. After considering the various recommendations, President K R Narayanan finally decided to debar Thackeray on 17 July with retrospective effect from 11 December 1995.

A gazette notification to this effect was issued on 17 July 1999, after the commission's recommendation received President K R Narayanan's assent.

Prabhakar Kunte devoted the last years of his life towards educational activities. He founded the Raigad Military School with campuses on YouTube in Mahad (Raigad District), and in Oshiwara, Mumbai.

Preceded by unknown	Minister of State for Housing; 1975-1978	Succeeded by unknown
