= Mahendra Dalvi =

Indian politician

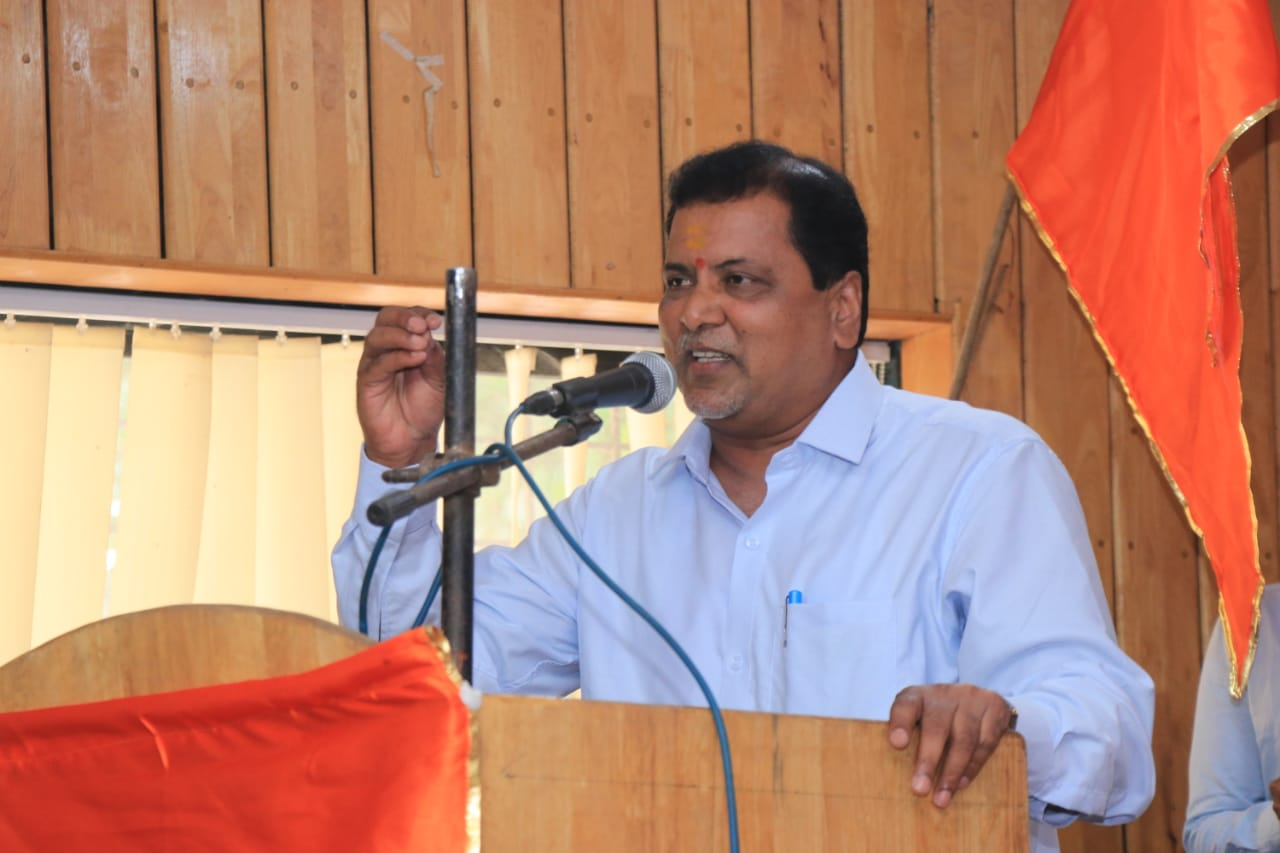

Member of the Maharashtra Legislative Assembly
- Incumbent
- Assumed office October 2019
- Constituency: Alibag

Personal details
- Party: Shiv Sena

Mahendraseth Dalvi is an Indian politician serving as Member of the Maharashtra Legislative Assembly from Alibag Vidhan Sabha constituency as a member of Shiv Sena.

== Positions held ==
- 2019: Elected to Maharashtra Legislative Assembly
- 2024: Elected to Maharashtra Legislative Assembly

== Electoral performance ==
Election	Constituency	Party	Result	Votes %	Opposition Candidate	Opposition Party	Opposition vote %	Ref
2024	Alibag	SS	Won	48.07%	Chitralekha Nrupal Patil Alias Chiutai	PWPI	35.56%	
2019	Alibag	SS	Won	52.68%	Subhash Alias Panditshet Patil	PWPI	37.18%	
2014	Alibag	SS	Lost	30.32%	Subhash Alias Panditshet Patil	PWPI	38.34%	
