= Tisangi =

Village in Maharashtra

Tisangi is a village Situated in Ratnagiri district state Maharashtra country India. This village mainly consists of Bhosale dynasty.
