= Ramji Mahadev Biwalkar =

Indian general during Peshwa period

Personal details
- Spouse: Unknown
- Children: Several

Ramji Mahadev Biwalkar was a Maratha General during the Peshwa Period. He is renowned as the builder of the Varadvinayak temple in Mahad.

== Military career ==
Biwalkar rose to be a Sardar of the Maratha Peshwas. He was Sar-Subedar (governor) of Kalyan and the Northern Konkan during the reigns of Peshwas Baji Rao I and Balaji Baji Rao. He faithfully served the Peshwas in subduing the rebellion of Damaji Gaikwad in March 1751.

== The Destruction of Maratha Naval Power ==
Biwalkar's major historical role is in the conflict between the Peshwas and Tulaji Angre, a son of the great Maratha Koli admiral Kanhoji Angre. The first Peshwa Balaji Vishwanath had pacified the Angres in 1713, getting Kanhoji to recognize the supremacy of the Maratha Chhatrapati Shahu. Through the reigns of Baji Rao I and Balaji Baji Rao, the Angres had carved out a semi-autonomous fiefdom, nominally subordinate to the Maratha kingdom.

After the death of Kanhoji Angre, his sons continually feuded with each other. Kolaba Fort was controlled by Manaji Angre. Sambhaji Angre retained the fortresses of Suvarnadurg and Vijayadurg and was succeeded by his half-brother Tulaji. Tulaji was ambitious and capable and did not wish to be subordinate to the Peshwa. He plundered the ships of all nations and began to levy contributions from the Peshwa's own territories. Tulaji styled Balaji Vishwanath as an usurper, and intrigued with the Kolhapur Bhonsle rulers, Tarabai and Rajaram II of Satara.

In the words of Kincaid & Parasnis:

To Ramaji Mahadev Biwalkar the turbulence of Tulaji Angre was particularly obnoxious...It was Ramaji Mahadev's duty to collect the Angre tribute, but, so far from paying it, Angre cut off the noses of the unfortunate men sent to collect it. He followed up this insolence by storming the fort of Ratnagiri, held by Amatya Bawadekar in the Peshwa's interest. To punish the searover was impossible, so long as he held the great forts of Suvarnadurg and Vijayadurg ; so, with a skill sharpened by hatred, Ramaji Mahadev strove to unite in a league against Tulaji, his brother Manaji Angre, the English and the Peshwa. The alliance of the English and of Manaji was easily obtained. But the Peshwa was for long reluctant to call in foreign aid against a Maratha subject. At last Tulaji's excesses and Ramaji's instances won Balaji over. On the 19th March, 1755, a treaty was signed by the English and the Marathas.
...The English were to command the allied fleets. Their reward was to be the forts of Bankot and Himmatgad together with five villages and also half the ships captured by the allies. The remaining forts, with their treasures and armament, were to become the property of the Peshwa.

...On the 2nd April the allied fleet reached Suvarnadurg. Eighty miles south of Bombay, Suvarnadurg stood on a low irregular island about a quarter of a mile from the shore. The fortifications were built out of the solid rock and the channel was protected by three forts named Goa, Fatehdurg, and Connoidurg. On the 2nd and 3rd April, Commodore James bombarded Angre's fortresses without result. On the 4th April the outer strongholds struck their colours. Only Suvarnadurg remained. But for months past Ramaji Mahadev had been corrupting its garrison. Thus, when a landing party from the ships disembarked to carry it by storm, they met with little or no resistance.
On the fall of the outer forts, Tulaji had fled to Vijayadurg, where he remained in safety until the following year. The approach of the monsoon made Commodore James anxious to return to Bombay, which he did on the 17th May. Ramaji Mahadev, reinforced by a strong body of troops under Shamsher Bahadur, the son of Bajirao and Mastani, took all Tulaji's lands in the neighbourhood of the conquered fortress. Another detachment under Khandoji Mankar drove Tulaji's soldiers from the villages near Vijayadurg. The attack on Vijayadurg itself was postponed until the next dry season...

Clive was the senior military officer and took command of the troops. On the 7th February, 1756, the fleet sailed from Bombay. Khandoji Mankar's force had been camped round Vijayadurg since the previous November and was engaged with Tulaji Angre in negotiations for its surrender. On seeing the great strength of the English armada, Tulaji fled in terror from the doomed stronghold and took shelter in Khandoji Mankar's lines. Neither Khandoji Mankar nor Ramaji Mahadev wished any longer to storm Vijayadurg, since Tulaji was in their power and could be forced to surrender it at any moment. But the English commanders resented the separate negotiations of the Marathas, and on the 12th April, 1756, their attack began. By 6-36 p.m. Angre's entire fleet had been destroyed and the English colours flew over Vijayadurg. Tulaji spent the rest of his life in captivity, first in Chandan Wandan fort near Satara and afterwards at Sholapur. The Peshwa annexed his lands.

== Buildings ==
Ramji Mahadev Biwalkar's built several temples and other civic buildings. His mansion in Kalyan (Subedarwada) survived into the 20th century. In 1765 he built an irrigation tank, Pokhran that still survives. Situated at Parnaka Kalyan West it is spread over an area of 20,000 sq ft and is 70 ft deep. His house in Thane was the district judge's office during the British administration. In Thane he repaired the temple of Koupineshwar, which was built in Shilahara era. His most famous relic is the temple of Varadavinayak at Mahad.

== Varadavinayak ==
In 1725 he built (or restored) the Varadavinayak temple in Mahad. Today this is regarded as one of the Ashtavinayak, the 8 major Ganesh temples of Maharashtra. The temple is located three kilometers off the Pune-Mumbai highway near Khopoli.

== Ganeshotsav ==
Biwalkar built a large mansion known as the Subedarwada in Kalyan. During the freedom struggle in 1906 Bal Gangadhar Tilak visited Kalyan and stayed at the mansion. Tilak revived and popularized the annual Ganesh festival through public celebrations (Sarvajanik Ganesh Utsav) in order to bring people closer and awaken them towards the cause of freedom struggle.

While the Subedarwada is no longer in existence, the annual Ganesh Utsav celebrations continue. A school was founded in 1896 at the side of the Subedarwada. The descendants of Ramji Mahadev continue to live in a rented house nearby.
