= Husen Dalwai =

Indian politician (1922–2022)

Husen Dalwai (1922 – 16 May 2022), not to be confused with another Congress politician with the same name from 2010s, was an Indian politician from the Congress(I) party in Maharashtra. He was elected from Ratnagiri to the 8th Lok Sabha in the 1984 general elections.

Dalwai was born at Mirjoli Village in Chiplun Taluk of Ratnagiri District on 17 August 1922 and worked as an advocate at Supreme Court.

He was Member of the Maharashtra Legislative Assembly from 1962 to 78, from Ratnagiri Khed and Khed Bundar constituencies. He was elected as Member of Rajya Sabha from Maharashtra for the term 3 April 1984 to 2 April 1990 but resigned on 28 December 1984 when he became a Lok Sabha member.
