= Alibag Assembly constituency =

Constituency of the Maharashtra legislative assembly in India

Coordinates: 18.6583805°N 72.8768785°E

Alibag Assembly constituency अलिबाग विधानसभा मतदारसंघ
- Constituency No. 192 for the Maharashtra Legislative Assembly

Constituency details
- Country: India
- Region: Western India
- State: Maharashtra
- Division: Konkan
- District: Raigad
- Lok Sabha constituency: Raigad Lok Sabha
- Established: 1952
- Total electors: 306,387
- Reservation: None

Member of Legislative Assembly
- 15th Maharashtra Legislative Assembly
- Incumbent Mahendra Dalvi
- Party: SHS
- Alliance: NDA
- Elected year: 2024

Alibag Assembly constituency is one of the 288 Vidhan Sabha (Assembly) constituencies of Maharashtra state in Western India. It comes inside Raigad district of Konkan division.

== Alibag Vidhan Sabha constituency Delimitation History ==
Following areas were included in Alibag constituency during delimitation every time.

S.No	Delimitation implemented Year	Area Included
1	2008	1. Alibag Tehsil, 2. Murud Tehsil 3. Roha Tehsil (Part), Revenue Circle Chanere.

== Members of the Legislative Assembly ==
Election	Member	Party
1952	Dattatraya Kashinath Kunte	Indian National Congress
1957	Datta Narayan Patil	Peasants and Workers Party of India
1962	Datajirao Krishnanarao Khanvilkar	Indian National Congress
1967	Datta Narayan Patil	Peasants and Workers Party of India
1972	Narayan Kanhoba Bhagat	Indian National Congress
1978	Datta Narayan Patil	Peasants and Workers Party of India
1980	Datta Narayan Patil	Peasants and Workers Party of India
1985	Datta Narayan Patil	Peasants and Workers Party of India
1990	Datta Narayan Patil	Peasants and Workers Party of India
1995	Meenakshi Patil	Peasants and Workers Party of India
1999	Meenakshi Patil	Peasants and Workers Party of India
2004	Madhukar Shankar Thakur	Indian National Congress
2009	Meenakshi Patil	Peasants and Workers Party of India
2014	Subhash Alias Panditshet Patil	Peasants and Workers Party of India
2019	Mahendra Dalvi	Shiv Sena
2024	Mahendra Dalvi	Shiv Sena

== Election results ==
=== Assembly Election 2024 ===
2024 Maharashtra Legislative Assembly election : Alibag
Party	Candidate	Votes	%	±%
SS	Mahendra Dalvi	113,599	48.07%	▼4.61
PWPI	Chitralekha Nrupal Patil Alias Chiutai	84,034	35.56%	▼1.62
Independent	Dilip Vitthal Bhoir Alias Chotamshet	33,210	14.05%	New
NOTA	None of the above	1,658	0.70%	▼0.39
Margin of victory		29,565	12.51%	▼2.98
Turnout		238,000	77.68%	▲4.79
Total valid votes		236,342		
Registered electors		306,387		▲3.95
SS hold		Swing	▼4.61	

=== Assembly Election 2019 ===
2019 Maharashtra Legislative Assembly election : Alibag
Party	Candidate	Votes	%	±%
SS	Mahendra Dalvi	111,946	52.68%	▲22.36
PWPI	Subhash Alias Panditshet Patil	79,022	37.18%	▼1.16
Independent	Rajendra Madhukar Thakur Alias Rajabhau Thakur	11,891	5.60%	New
Independent	Ashraf Latif Ghatte	2,920	1.37%	New
INC	Adv. Thakur Shraddha Mahesh	2,526	1.19%	▼21.65
NOTA	None of the above	2,313	1.09%	▲0.25
Margin of victory		32,924	15.49%	▲7.47
Turnout		214,838	72.89%	▼0.46
Total valid votes		212,512		
Registered electors		294,748		▲6.81
SS gain from PWPI		Swing	▲14.34	

=== Assembly Election 2014 ===
2014 Maharashtra Legislative Assembly election : Alibag
Party	Candidate	Votes	%	±%
PWPI	Subhash Alias Panditshet Patil	76,959	38.34%	▼15.27
SS	Mahendra Dalvi	60,865	30.32%	New
INC	Thakur Madhukar Shankar	45,853	22.84%	▼16.88
BJP	Kathe Prakash Gopal	6,054	3.02%	New
NCP	Mahesh Harishchandra Mohite	3,500	1.74%	New
NOTA	None of the above	1,695	0.84%	New
JD(U)	Dalvi Mahendra Hari	1,219	0.61%	New
Margin of victory		16,094	8.02%	▼5.88
Turnout		202,419	73.35%	▲2.70
Total valid votes		200,721		
Registered electors		275,945		▲12.18
PWPI hold		Swing	▼15.27	

=== Assembly Election 2009 ===
2009 Maharashtra Legislative Assembly election : Alibag
Party	Candidate	Votes	%	±%
PWPI	Meenakshi Patil	93,173	53.61%	▲14.19
INC	Thakur Madhukar Shankar	69,025	39.72%	▼3.56
Independent	Rajaram Narayan Patil	2,175	1.25%	New
BSP	Anil Baban Gaikwad	1,937	1.11%	New
Independent	Sanjay Kashinath Patil	1,683	0.97%	New
Independent	Minakshi Prabhakar Patil	1,608	0.93%	New
JSS	Halade Nainuddin Jainuddin	1,384	0.80%	New
Independent	Subhash Janardan Patil	1,277	0.73%	New
Margin of victory		24,148	13.90%	▲10.04
Turnout		173,786	70.65%	▼1.02
Total valid votes		173,783		
Registered electors		245,991		▲15.88
PWPI gain from INC		Swing	▲10.33	

=== Assembly Election 2004 ===
2004 Maharashtra Legislative Assembly election : Alibag
Party	Candidate	Votes	%	±%
INC	Thakur Madhukar Shankar	65,828	43.28%	▲11.44
PWPI	Meenakshi Patil	59,961	39.42%	▼8.31
SS	Naresh Datta Rahalkar	12,972	8.53%	▼10.81
Independent	Sarang Sainath Narayan	3,928	2.58%	New
ABS	Dhumal Santosh Maruti	2,803	1.84%	New
Independent	Meenakshi Patil	1,393	0.92%	New
Margin of victory		5,867	3.86%	▼12.03
Turnout		152,135	71.67%	▲11.53
Total valid votes		152,095		
Registered electors		212,283		▲7.48
INC gain from PWPI		Swing	▼4.45	

=== Assembly Election 1999 ===
1999 Maharashtra Legislative Assembly election : Alibag
Party	Candidate	Votes	%	±%
PWPI	Meenakshi Patil	53,459	47.73%	New
INC	Madhu Thakur	35,657	31.84%	▲3.77
SS	Mhatre Surendra Moreshwar	21,659	19.34%	▲0.05
Independent	Bhai Datta Patil	1,226	1.09%	New
Margin of victory		17,802	15.89%	▼1.07
Turnout		118,776	60.14%	▼14.57
Total valid votes		112,001		
Registered electors		197,501		▲5.18
PWPI gain from PWPI		Swing	▲2.70	

=== Assembly Election 1995 ===
1995 Maharashtra Legislative Assembly election : Alibag
Party	Candidate	Votes	%	±%
PWPI	Meenakshi Patil	61,569	45.03%	▼6.00
INC	Kawale Vijay Namdev	38,380	28.07%	▼9.72
SS	Parashant B. Patil	26,378	19.29%	▲8.62
Independent	Dawoor R. Kanuji	5,741	4.20%	New
Independent	Datta Narayan Patil	2,052	1.50%	New
Independent	Arvind W. Kalkarni	1,231	0.90%	New
Margin of victory		23,189	16.96%	▲3.71
Turnout		140,294	74.71%	▲2.71
Total valid votes		136,723		
Registered electors		187,773		▲15.29
PWPI hold		Swing	▼6.00	

=== Assembly Election 1990 ===
1990 Maharashtra Legislative Assembly election : Alibag
Party	Candidate	Votes	%	±%
PWPI	Patil Dattatrey Narayan	58,878	51.03%	▼20.05
INC	Kawale Vijay Namdev	43,596	37.79%	▲8.87
SS	Arjun Shantaram Patil	12,316	10.67%	New
Margin of victory		15,282	13.25%	▼28.92
Turnout		117,278	72.00%	▲8.90
Total valid votes		115,378		
Registered electors		162,875		▲31.17
PWPI hold		Swing	▼20.05	

=== Assembly Election 1985 ===
1985 Maharashtra Legislative Assembly election : Alibag
Party	Candidate	Votes	%	±%
PWPI	Datta Narayan Patil	54,368	71.08%	▲3.35
INC	A. G. (Ravi) Patil	22,116	28.92%	New
Margin of victory		32,252	42.17%	▲6.70
Turnout		78,359	63.10%	▲5.87
Total valid votes		76,484		
Registered electors		124,173		▲13.54
PWPI hold		Swing	▲3.35	

=== Assembly Election 1980 ===
1980 Maharashtra Legislative Assembly election : Alibag
Party	Candidate	Votes	%	±%
PWPI	Patil Dattatrey Narayan	41,191	67.73%	▲19.51
INC(I)	Narayan Kanhoba Bhagat	19,623	32.27%	New
Margin of victory		21,568	35.47%	▲17.21
Turnout		62,593	57.23%	▼15.00
Total valid votes		60,814		
Registered electors		109,367		▲5.64
PWPI hold		Swing	▲19.51	

=== Assembly Election 1978 ===
1978 Maharashtra Legislative Assembly election : Alibag
Party	Candidate	Votes	%	±%
PWPI	Datta Narayan Patil	34,958	48.22%	▲15.83
INC	Khanvilkar Datajirao Krishnanarao	21,723	29.97%	▼8.65
JP	Patil Madhukar Posu	15,811	21.81%	New
Margin of victory		13,235	18.26%	▲12.03
Turnout		74,779	72.23%	▲1.74
Total valid votes		72,492		
Registered electors		103,524		▲21.83
PWPI gain from INC		Swing	▲9.60	

=== Assembly Election 1972 ===
1972 Maharashtra Legislative Assembly election : Alibag
Party	Candidate	Votes	%	±%
INC	Narayan Kanhoba Bhagat	22,279	38.62%	▼6.61
PWPI	Vasant Rajaram Raut	18,685	32.39%	▼18.26
Independent	Khanvilkar Datajirao Krishnanarao	16,724	28.99%	New
Margin of victory		3,594	6.23%	▲0.82
Turnout		59,900	70.49%	▼3.17
Total valid votes		57,688		
Registered electors		84,974		▲11.66
INC gain from PWPI		Swing	▼12.03	

=== Assembly Election 1967 ===
1967 Maharashtra Legislative Assembly election : Alibag
Party	Candidate	Votes	%	±%
PWPI	Datta Narayan Patil	27,011	50.65%	▲13.67
INC	Khanvilkar Datajirao Krishnanarao	24,124	45.23%	▼6.18
ABJS	B. M. Kathe	2,197	4.12%	New
Margin of victory		2,887	5.41%	▼9.03
Turnout		56,052	73.66%	▲4.61
Total valid votes		53,332		
Registered electors		76,099		▲35.73
PWPI gain from INC		Swing	▼0.76	

=== Assembly Election 1962 ===
1962 Maharashtra Legislative Assembly election : Alibag
Party	Candidate	Votes	%	±%
INC	Khanvilkar Datajirao Krishnanarao	18,762	51.41%	▲18.49
PWPI	Datta Narayan Patil	13,494	36.98%	▼30.10
PSP	Prabhakar Kashinath Kunte	2,651	7.26%	New
ABJS	Achyut Mahadev Oak	1,586	4.35%	New
Margin of victory		5,268	14.44%	▼19.73
Turnout		38,717	69.05%	▼0.97
Total valid votes		36,493		
Registered electors		56,068		▲3.78
INC gain from PWPI		Swing	▼15.67	

=== Assembly Election 1957 ===
1957 Bombay State Legislative Assembly election : Alibag
Party	Candidate	Votes	%	±%
PWPI	Datta Narayan Patil	25,378	67.08%	▲29.99
INC	Bhide Manorambal Purushottam	12,452	32.92%	▼21.75
Margin of victory		12,926	34.17%	▲16.59
Turnout		37,830	70.02%	▲6.47
Total valid votes		37,830		
Registered electors		54,028		▲1.87
PWPI gain from INC		Swing	▲12.41	

=== Assembly Election 1952 ===
1952 Bombay State Legislative Assembly election : Alibag
Party	Candidate	Votes	%	±%
INC	Kunte Dattatraya Kashinath	18,426	54.67%	New
PWPI	Patil Narayan Nagu	12,502	37.09%	New
Socialist	Patil Prabhakar Gangaram	1,731	5.14%	New
Independent	Patil Laxman Govind	1,046	3.10%	New
Margin of victory		5,924	17.58%	
Turnout		33,705	63.55%	
Total valid votes		33,705		
Registered electors		53,036		
INC win (new seat)				
