= Ratnagiri Lok Sabha constituency =

Former constituency of the Indian parliament in Maharashtra

Coordinates: 17.0°N 73.3°E

Ratnagiri
- Former Lok Sabha constituency

Constituency details
- Country: India
- Region: Western India
- State: Maharashtra
- Assembly constituencies: Chiplun; Ratnagiri; Rajapur; Kankavli; Kudal; Sawantwadi
- Established: 1951
- Abolished: 2009

Ratnagiri was a Lok Sabha parliamentary constituency in Maharashtra. In 2008, it was merged with some other areas to form a new Lok Sabha seat called Ratnagiri-Sindhudurg Lok Sabha constituency.

== Members of Parliament ==
Year	Member	Party
1952	Jaganath Rao Bhonsle	Indian National Congress
1952	Moreshwar Dinkar Joshi	Indian National Congress
1957	Premjibhai Assar	Bharatiya Jana Sangh
1962	Sharda Mukherjee	Indian National Congress
1967	Sharda Mukherjee	Indian National Congress
1971	Shantaram Peje	Indian National Congress
1977	Bapusaheb Parulekar	Janata Party
1980	Bapusaheb Parulekar	Janata Party
1984	Husen Dalwai	Indian National Congress
1989	Govindrao Nikam	Indian National Congress
1991	Govindrao Nikam	Indian National Congress
1996	Anant Geete	Shiv Sena
1998	Anant Geete	Shiv Sena
1999	Anant Geete	Shiv Sena
2004	Anant Geete	Shiv Sena
2009 onwards : See Ratnagiri–Sindhudurg Lok Sabha constituency

== Election results ==
=== 2004 ===
2004 Indian general elections: Ratnagiri
Party	Candidate	Votes	%	±%
SS	Anant Geete	334,690	59.66	+4.67
NCP	Govindrao Nikam	185,722	33.11	−0.3
PWPI	Pankaj Kawli	25,951	4.6	
BSP	Rajendra Ayere	14,613	2.6	
Majority		148,968	26.55	
Turnout		561,300	61.36	−2.63
SS hold		Swing	+4.67	

== See also ==
- Ratnagiri-Sindhudurg Lok Sabha constituency
- List of constituencies of the Lok Sabha
