= Kopri-Pachpakhadi Assembly constituency =

Constituency of the Maharashtra legislative assembly in India

Coordinates: 19°10′48.62″N 72°57′35.58″E

Kopri-Pachpakhadi
- Constituency No. 147 for the Maharashtra Legislative Assembly

Constituency details
- Country: India
- Region: Western India
- State: Maharashtra
- District: Thane
- Lok Sabha constituency: Thane
- Established: 2008
- Total electors: 339,659
- Reservation: None

Member of Legislative Assembly
- 15th Maharashtra Legislative Assembly
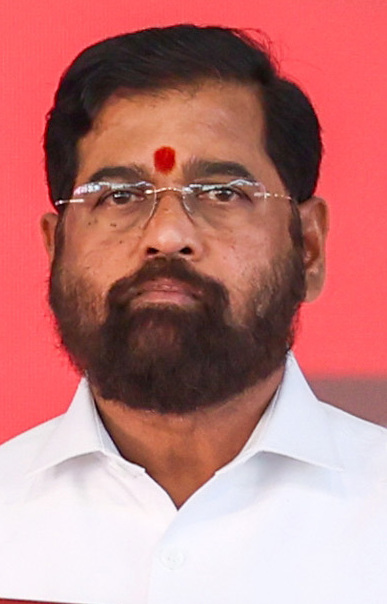
- Incumbent Eknath Shinde; Deputy Chief Minister of Maharashtra
- Party: SHS
- Alliance: NDA
- Elected year: 2024

Kopri-Pachpakhadi Assembly constituency is one of the 288 Vidhan Sabha (Legislative Assembly) constituencies of Maharashtra state in western India.

== Overview ==
Kopri-Pachpakhadi constituency is one of the 18 Vidhan Sabha constituencies located in the Thane district. It comprises part of the Thane Municipal Corporation and part of Thane tehsil of the district.

Kopri-Pachpakhadi is part of the Thane Lok Sabha constituency along with five other Vidhan Sabha segments, namely, Mira Bhayandar, Ovala-Majiwada, Thane, Airoli and Belapur in Thane district.

== Members of the Legislative Assembly ==
Year	Member	Party
Until 2008: Constituency did not exist
2009	Eknath Shinde	Shiv Sena
2014	Eknath Shinde	Shiv Sena
2019	Eknath Shinde	Shiv Sena
2024	Eknath Shinde	Shiv Sena

== Election results ==
=== Assembly Election 2024 ===
2024 Maharashtra Legislative Assembly election : Kopri-Pachpakhadi
Party	Candidate	Votes	%	±%
SS	Eknath Sambhaji Shinde	159,060	79.33	▲11.98
SS(UBT)	Kedar Prakash Dighe	38,343	19.12	New
Independent	Manoj Tukaram Shinde	1,653	0.82	▼1.72
NOTA	None of the Above	2,676	1.33	New
Margin of victory		120,717	60.21	▲7.22
Turnout		203,176	59.82	▲11.29
Total valid votes		200,500		
Registered electors		339,659		▼3.78
SS hold		Swing	▲11.98	

=== Assembly Election 2019 ===
2019 Maharashtra Legislative Assembly election : Kopri-Pachpakhadi
Party	Candidate	Votes	%	±%
SS	Eknath Sambhaji Shinde	113,497	67.35	▲12.24
INC	Sanjay Pandurang Ghadigaonkar	24,197	14.36	▲4.54
MNS	Mahesh Parshuram Kadam	21,513	12.77	▲8.05
VBA	Bagwe Unmesh B.	5,925		New
BSP	Prabhakar Baburao Wagh	1,047	0.62	▲1.65
NOTA	None of the Above	5,147	3.52	▼0.40
Margin of victory		89,300	52.99	▲24.50
Turnout		173,676	49.20	▼4.65
Total valid votes		168,515		
Registered electors		352,995		▲1.58
SS hold		Swing	▲12.24	

=== Assembly Election 2014 ===
2014 Maharashtra Legislative Assembly election : Kopri-Pachpakhadi
Party	Candidate	Votes	%	±%
SS	Eknath Sambhaji Shinde	100,316	55.11	▲9.75
BJP	Adv. Sandeep Lele	48,447	26.61	New
INC	Mohan Parasnath Goswami	17,873	9.82	▼15.32
MNS	Sejal Sanjay Kadam	8,578	4.71	▼17.45
NCP	Bipin Kamalu Mahale	3,710	1.41	New
BSP	Gajare Rajhans Manik	1,861	1.02	New
NOTA	None of the Above	2,565	1.41	▼0.13
Margin of victory		51,869	28.49	▲8.27
Turnout		184,605	53.12	▲1.44
Total valid votes		182,033		
Registered electors		347,497		▲9.26
SS hold		Swing	▲9.75	

=== Assembly Election 2009 ===
2009 Maharashtra Legislative Assembly election : Kopri-Pachpakhadi
Party	Candidate	Votes	%	±%
SS	Eknath Sambhaji Shinde	73,502	45.36	New
INC	Manoj Tukaram Shinde	40,726	25.13	New
MNS	Gawand Rajan Shantaram	35,914	22.16	New
SP	Yadav Ramnayan Jaggnath	3,991	2.46	New
BSP	Kamble Vilas Chandu	1,864	1.15	New
Margin of victory		32,776	20.23	
Turnout		162,038	50.95	
Total valid votes		162,037		
Registered electors		318,060		
SS win (new seat)				

== See also ==
- Kopri
- Pachpakhadi
- List of constituencies of Maharashtra Vidhan Sabha
