= Thane Lok Sabha constituency =

Lok Sabha constituency in Maharashtra

Coordinates: 19.22°N 72.98°E

Thane Lok Sabha
- Lok Sabha constituency
- Thane Lok Sabha Constituency map

Constituency details
- Country: India
- Region: Western India
- State: Maharashtra
- Assembly constituencies: Mira Bhayandar; Kopri-Pachpakhadi; Ovala-Majiwada; Thane; Airoli; Belapur
- Established: 1952
- Total electors: 25,07,372
- Reservation: None

Member of Parliament
- 18th Lok Sabha
- Incumbent Naresh Mhaske
- Party: SHS
- Alliance: NDA
- Elected year: 2024
- Preceded by: Rajan Vichare

Thane Lok Sabha constituency (formerly, Thana Lok Sabha constituency) is one of the 48 Lok Sabha (parliamentary) constituencies of Maharashtra state in western India.

== Assembly segments ==
At present, after the implementation of the Presidential notification on delimitation on 19 February 2008, Thane Lok Sabha constituency comprises six Vidhan Sabha (legislative assembly) segments. These segments are:

#	Name	District	Member	Party	Leading (in 2024)
145	Mira Bhayandar	Thane	Narendra Mehta	BJP	SHS
146	Ovala-Majiwada	Thane	Pratap Sarnaik	SHS	SHS
147	Kopri-Pachpakhadi	Thane	Eknath Shinde	SHS	SHS
148	Thane	Thane	Sanjay Kelkar	BJP	SHS
150	Airoli	Thane	Ganesh Naik	BJP	SHS
151	Belapur	Thane	Manda Mhatre	BJP	SHS

== Members of Parliament ==
In 1952 and 1957, this Thane area contributed two members to Lok Sabha.

- 1952: Govind Dharmaji Vartak, Indian National Congress
- 1952: Anant Savalaram Nandkar, Indian National Congress (ST)
- 1952:Choithram Partabrai Gidwani, PSP
- 1952 (by-poll): Yashwantrao Martandrao Mukne, Indian National Congress (ST)
- 1957: Shamrao Vishnu Parulekar, Communist Party of India
- 1957: Laxman Mahadu Matera, Communist Party of India (ST)

In 2008, the Delimitation Commission of India split the seat into Thane and Kalyan seats.

Year	Member	Party
1962	Sonubhau Baswant	Indian National Congress
1967-76 : Seat does not exist
1977	Rambhau Mhalgi	Bharatiya Lok Dal
1980	Rambhau Mhalgi	Bharatiya Lok Dal
1982 (Note: bypoll)	Jagannath Patil	Bharatiya Janata Party
1984	Shantaram Gholap	Indian National Congress
1989	Ram Kapse	Bharatiya Janata Party
1991	Ram Kapse	Bharatiya Janata Party
1996	Prakash Paranjape	Shiv Sena
1998	Prakash Paranjape	Shiv Sena
1999	Prakash Paranjape	Shiv Sena
2004	Prakash Paranjape	Shiv Sena
2008 (Note: bypoll)	Anand Paranjpe	Shiv Sena
2009	Sanjeev Naik	Nationalist Congress Party
2014	Rajan Vichare	Shiv Sena
2019	Rajan Vichare	Shiv Sena
2024	Naresh Mhaske	Shiv Sena

== Election results ==
=== 2024 ===
2024 Indian general elections: Thane
Party	Candidate	Votes	%	±%
SHS	Naresh Ganpat Mhaske	734,231	56.09	▼7.21
SS(UBT)	Rajan Vichare	5,17,220	39.51	New
NOTA	None of the above	17,901	1.37	▼0.38
Majority		2,17,011	16.58	▼18.63
Turnout		13,11,056	52.27	▲2.88
SS hold		Swing		

=== 2019 ===
2019 Indian general elections: Thane
Party	Candidate	Votes	%	±%
SS	Rajan Baburao Vichare	740,969	63.30	
NCP	Anand Paranjpe	3,28,824	28.09	
VBA	Mallikarjun Saibanna Pujari	47,432	4.05	
NOTA	None of the above	20,426	1.75	
Majority		4,12,145	35.21	
Turnout		11,70,970	49.39	−1.46
SS hold		Swing	+7.84	

=== 2014 ===
2014 Indian general elections: Thane
Party	Candidate	Votes	%	±%
SS	Rajan Baburao Vichare	595,364	56.46	+22.86
NCP	Sanjeev Ganesh Naik	3,14,065	29.78	−10.36
MNS	Abhijit Ramesh Panse	48,863	4.63	−13.35
AAP	Sanjeev Vishnu Sane	41,535	3.94	N/A
BSP	Vidhyadhar Bhimrao Kirtawade	10,982	1.04	−0.85
NOTA	None of the Above	13,174	1.25	N/A
Majority		2,81,299	26.68	+20.14
Turnout		10,54,189	50.85	+9.35
SS gain from NCP		Swing	+17.66	

=== 2009 ===
2009 Indian general elections: Thane
Party	Candidate	Votes	%	±%
NCP	Dr. Sanjeev Ganesh Naik	301,000	40.14	−1.67
SS	Vijay Laxman Chaugule	2,51,980	33.60	−18.42
MNS	Rajan Raje	1,34,840	17.98	N/A
BSP	Avanindra Kumar Tripathi	14,192	1.89	−0.47
Independent	Vidyadhar Laxman Joshi	9,680	1.29	N/A
Majority		49,020	6.53	+1.48
Turnout		7,49,873	41.50	N/A
NCP gain from SS		Swing	-1.67	

=== Bye-election 2008 ===
Bye-election, 2008: Thane
Party	Candidate	Votes	%	±%
SS	Anand Paranjape	462,766	52.02	+4.86
NCP	Sanjeev Naik	3,71,894	41.81	−4.58
BSP	Chandrashekhar Shukla	20,971	2.36	+0.47
Majority		90,872	5.05	+3.63
Turnout		8,89,568	26.78	−13.75
SS hold		Swing	+4.86	

=== 2004 ===
2004 Indian general elections: Thane
Party	Candidate	Votes	%	±%
SS	Prakash Paranjape	631,414	48.08	+4.86
NCP	Vasant Davkhare	6,09,156	46.39	+26.82
BSP	Sambhaji Pawar	24,828	1.89	
SP	Karmaveer Yadav	22,412	1.70	
Majority		22,258	1.69	−9.32
Turnout		13,13,252	40.53	+6.84
SS hold		Swing	+4.86	

=== 1999 ===
1999 Indian general election: Thane
Party	Candidate	Votes	%	±%
SS	Prakash Paranjape	391,446	43.22	
INC	Nakul Patil	2,91,763	32.21	
NCP	Prabhakar Hegade	1,77,256	19.57	
Majority		99,683	11.01	
Turnout		9,05,683		
SS hold		Swing		

== See also ==
- Thane district
- List of constituencies of the Lok Sabha
