= Ovala-Majiwada Assembly constituency =

Constituency of the Maharashtra legislative assembly in India

Coordinates: 19.2742323°N 72.9576651°E

Ovala-Majiwada
- Constituency No. 146 for the Maharashtra Legislative Assembly
- Interactive Map Outlining Ovala-Majiwada Assembly Constituency

Constituency details
- Country: India
- Region: Western India
- State: Maharashtra
- District: Thane
- Lok Sabha constituency: Thane
- Established: 2008
- Total electors: 545,223
- Reservation: None

Member of Legislative Assembly
- 15th Maharashtra Legislative Assembly
- Incumbent Pratap Sarnaik
- Party: SHS
- Alliance: NDA
- Elected year: 2024

Ovala-Majiwada Assembly constituency is one of the 288 Vidhan Sabha (Legislative Assembly) constituencies of Maharashtra state in western India.

== Overview ==
Ovala-Majiwada constituency is one of the 18 Vidhan Sabha constituencies located in Thane district.

Ovala-Majiwada is part of Thane Lok Sabha constituency along with five other Vidhan Sabha segments, namely, Mira Bhayandar, Kopri-Pachpakhadi, Thane, Airoli and Belapur in Thane district.

== Members of the Legislative Assembly ==
Year	Member	Party
Until 2008: Constituency did not exist
2009	Pratap Sarnaik	Shiv Sena
2014	Pratap Sarnaik	Shiv Sena
2019	Pratap Sarnaik	Shiv Sena
2024	Pratap Sarnaik	Shiv Sena

== Election results ==
=== Assembly Election 2024 ===
2024 Maharashtra Legislative Assembly election : Ovala-Majiwada
Party	Candidate	Votes	%	±%
SS	Pratap Baburao Sarnaik	184,178	65.46%	▲2.78
SS(UBT)	Naresh Manera	76,020	27.02%	New
MNS	Sandeep Dinkar Pachange	13,552	4.82%	▼6.45
NOTA	None of the Above	4,193	1.49%	▼1.74
VBA	Lobhsingh Ganpatrao Rathod	2,969	1.06%	▼2.41
Margin of victory		108,158	38.44%	▼6.34
Turnout		285,554	52.37%	▲9.89
Total valid votes		281,361		
Registered electors		545,223		▲21.24
SS hold		Swing	▲2.78	

=== Assembly Election 2019 ===
2019 Maharashtra Legislative Assembly election : Ovala-Majiwada
Party	Candidate	Votes	%	±%
SS	Pratap Baburao Sarnaik	117,593	62.68%	▲25.45
INC	Chavan Vikrant Bhimsen	33,585	17.90%	▲10.56
MNS	Sandeep Dinkar Pachange	21,132	11.26%	▲0.10
VBA	Divekar Kishor Taterao	6,492	3.46%	New
NOTA	None of the Above	6,054	3.23%	▲1.93
Independent	Sanaullah Majhar Husain Chaudhari	3,360	1.79%	New
Sambhaji Brigade Party	Vikas Krishna Mukadam	1,296	0.69%	New
BSP	Tirpude Uttam Kisanrao	1,267	0.68%	▼0.13
Margin of victory		84,008	44.78%	▲38.86
Turnout		193,717	43.08%	▼7.99
Total valid votes		187,615		
Registered electors		449,717		▲21.37
SS hold		Swing	▲25.45	

=== Assembly Election 2014 ===
2014 Maharashtra Legislative Assembly election : Ovala-Majiwada
Party	Candidate	Votes	%	±%
SS	Pratap Baburao Sarnaik	68,571	37.23%	▲1.19
BJP	Sanjay Pandey	57,665	31.31%	New
NCP	Hanmant Dnyanu Jagdale	20,686	11.23%	New
MNS	Chavan Sudhakar Waman	20,568	11.17%	▼18.65
INC	Prabhat Prakash Patil	13,529	7.35%	▼16.06
NOTA	None of the Above	2,390	1.30%	New
BSP	Ramesh Kashinath Sabale	1,480	0.80%	▲0.08
Margin of victory		10,906	5.92%	▼0.30
Turnout		186,579	50.35%	▲2.87
Total valid votes		184,189		
Registered electors		370,547		▲19.40
SS hold		Swing	▲1.19	

=== Assembly Election 2009 ===
2009 Maharashtra Legislative Assembly election : Ovala-Majiwada
Party	Candidate	Votes	%	±%
SS	Pratap Baburao Sarnaik	52,373	36.03%	New
MNS	Chavan Sudhakar Waman	43,332	29.81%	New
INC	Dilip Sadashiv Deherkar	34,018	23.41%	New
RPIE	Indise Gangaram Dodha	8,847	6.09%	New
Independent	Adv. Dilip Vishnu Pandit	1,119	0.77%	New
BSP	Kamble Babukumar Kashinath	1,052	0.72%	New
RKSP	Pathan Javed Kamil	1,032	0.71%	New
Margin of victory		9,041	6.22%	
Turnout		145,347	46.83%	
Total valid votes		145,342		
Registered electors		310,341		
SS win (new seat)				

== See also ==
- Majiwada
- List of constituencies of Maharashtra Vidhan Sabha
