= Airoli Assembly constituency =

Constituency of the Maharashtra legislative assembly in India

Coordinates: 19.16°N 72.97°E

Airoli
- Constituency No. 150 for the Maharashtra Legislative Assembly

Constituency details
- Country: India
- Region: Western India
- State: Maharashtra
- District: Thane
- Lok Sabha constituency: Thane
- Established: 2008
- Total electors: 489,215
- Reservation: None

Member of Legislative Assembly
- 15th Maharashtra Legislative Assembly
- Incumbent Ganesh Naik
- Party: Bharatiya Janata Party
- Elected year: 2024

Airoli Assembly constituency is one of the 288 Vidhan Sabha (Legislative Assembly) constituencies of Maharashtra state in western India.

== Overview ==
Airoli constituency is one of the 18 Vidhan Sabha constituencies located in Thane district, in Navi Mumbai area.

Airoli is part of the Thane Lok Sabha constituency along with five other Vidhan Sabha segments, namely, Mira Bhayandar, Kopri-Pachpakhadi, Thane, Ovala-Majiwada and Belapur in Thane district.

== Members of the Legislative Assembly ==
Year	Member	Party
Until 2008: Constituency did not exist
2009	Sandeep Naik	Nationalist Congress Party
2014	Sandeep Naik	Nationalist Congress Party
2019	Ganesh Naik	Bharatiya Janata Party
2024	Ganesh Naik	Bharatiya Janata Party

== Election results ==
=== Assembly Election 2024 ===
2024 Maharashtra Legislative Assembly election : Airoli
Party	Candidate	Votes	%	±%
BJP	Ganesh Naik	144,261	54.98	▼4.98
Independent	Vijay Laxman Chougule	52,381	19.96	New
SS(UBT)	Manohar Krishna Madhavi (M. K. )	38,576	14.70	New
MSP	Ankush Sakharam Kadam	8,861	3.38	New
MNS	Bankhele Nilesh Arun	6,908	2.63	▼9.30
VBA	Vikrant Dayanand Chikane	6,411	2.44	▼4.58
NOTA	None of the Above	2,708	1.03	▼1.69
Margin of victory		91,880	35.02	▼6.03
Turnout		265,089	54.19	▲12.20
Total valid votes		262,381		
Registered electors		489,215		▲6.01
BJP hold		Swing	▼4.98	

=== Assembly Election 2019 ===
2019 Maharashtra Legislative Assembly election : Airoli
Party	Candidate	Votes	%	±%
BJP	Ganesh Naik	114,645	59.96	▲37.71
NCP	Ganesh Raghu Shinde	36,154	18.91	▼17.73
MNS	Nilesh Arun Bankhele	22,818	11.93	▲9.96
VBA	Dr. Prakash Dhokane	13,424	7.02	New
NOTA	None of the Above	5,213	2.73	New
BSP	Jaiswal Rajesh Gangaprasad	1,376	0.72	▼0.22
Margin of victory		78,491	41.05	▲36.87
Turnout		196,476	42.57	▼9.68
Total valid votes		191,211		
Registered electors		461,489		▲13.07
BJP gain from NCP		Swing	▲23.32	

=== Assembly Election 2014 ===
2014 Maharashtra Legislative Assembly election : Airoli
Party	Candidate	Votes	%	±%
NCP	Sandeep Naik	76,444	36.64	▼13.49
SS	Vijay Laxman Chougule	67,719	32.46	▼10.09
BJP	Vaibhav Tukaram Naik	46,405	22.24	New
INC	Mhatre Ramakant Narayan	8,794	4.22	New
MNS	Khabale Gajanan Shamrao	4,111	1.97	New
BSP	Bhima Hanumanta Mane	1,968	0.94	▼0.41
NOTA	None of the Above	1,697	0.81	New
Margin of victory		8,725	4.18	▼3.40
Turnout		210,328	51.53	▲1.28
Total valid votes		208,629		
Registered electors		408,139		▲28.95
NCP hold		Swing	▼13.49	

=== Assembly Election 2009 ===
2009 Maharashtra Legislative Assembly election : Airoli
Party	Candidate	Votes	%	±%
NCP	Sandeep Naik	79,075	50.13	New
SS	Vijay Laxman Chougule	67,118	42.55	New
RPI(A)	Ohol Sidram Pandurang	3,075	1.95	New
BSP	Capt. Maheshchandra Varma	2,128	1.35	New
Independent	Mane Bhima Hunumanta	1,809	1.15	New
Independent	Vasant Shankar Mhatre	1,764	1.12	New
Independent	Dnyandeo Ramchandra Patil	1,063	0.67	New
Margin of victory		11,957	7.58	
Turnout		157,755	49.84	
Total valid votes		157,751		
Registered electors		316,514		
NCP win (new seat)				

== See also ==
- Airoli
- List of constituencies of Maharashtra Vidhan Sabha
