= Sonubhau Dagadu Baswant =

Indian politician

Sonubhau Baswant

Member of Parliament, Lok Sabha
- In office 1967–1971
- Succeeded by: Rambhau Mhalgi
- Constituency: Thane
- In office 1962–1967
- Preceded by: Laxman Mahadu Matera
- Succeeded by: himself
- Constituency: Thane

Personal details
- Born: Sonubhau Dagadu Baswant; 10 February 1915 Khutghar, Shahpur, British India
- Died: 16 December 1987 (aged 72) Maharashtra India
- Party: Indian National Congress
- Spouse: Parwatibai Baswant
- Profession: Agriculturist, politician

Sonubhau Dagadu Baswant (10 February 1915 – 16 December 1987) was an India agriculturist and politician from Thane, Maharashtra. He was the member of parliament from the Thane constituency of Maharashtra and a member of the Indian National Congress.

== Personal life ==
Baswant was born in Khutghar, Shahpur Thane district, he was married to Parwatibai and resided at Shahpur in Thane district. He was an agriculturist by profession.

== Other positions held ==
- Member of Thane District Development Board (1952–1959)
- President of Thane District Congress Committee (1959–1964)
- Member of All India Congress Committee (1964–1967)
- Chairman of the Shahapur Taluka Co-operative Milk Production Union (1963–1987)
- Member of the Maharashtra State Forest Development Board and Maharashtra Development Co-operative Union
- President of Ambernath Ordnance Factory National Employees Union

== Legacy ==
Many Roads, Schools and Colleges in Shahpur has been named in his honour.
