= Kanti Koli =

Indian politician

- कांती कोळी

Member of Member of legislative assembly for Thane constituency
- In office 1980–1990
- Preceded by: Gajanan Koli
- Succeeded by: Moreshwar Joshi

Personal details
- Born: Kanti Koli; 1947 Thane, Maharashtra, India
- Died: 2021 (aged 73–74)
- Citizenship: India
- Party: Indian National Congress
- Occupation: Politician
- Nickname: Kanti Dada

Kanti Koli (1947 - 2021) was an Indian politician, social worker and former councillor Thane Municipal Corporation and two terms Member of legislative assembly from Thane, constituency of Maharashtra state of India as a senior leader of Indian National Congress party and former president of Akhil Bharatiya Koli Samaj's Maharashtra unit. Kanti Koli was closely associated with former Indian president Ram Nath Kovind and also represented the fishermen community at the state and national level.

Kanti Koli was dead in October 2021 because of his long-term illness.
