= Narayan Pawar =

Indian politician

Narayan Shankar Pawar
- Constituency: Thane Municipal Corporation

Personal details
- Born: 1 August 1963 (age 62) Mumbai, Maharashtra
- Party: Bhartiya Janta Party
- Children: 2

Narayan Shankar Pawar (born 1 August 1963) is an Indian politician and a current member of Thane Municipal Corporation Standing committee. He was elected to the Standing committee as an Indian National Congress candidate in Jan 2012 general election.
