= Ganesh Naik =

Indian politician (born 1950)

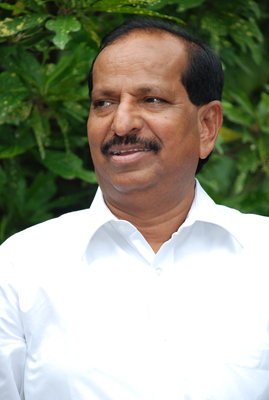

Minister of Forest Government of Maharashtra
- Incumbent
- Assumed office 15 December 2024
- Chief Minister: Devendra Fadnavis
- Guardian Minister: Palghar district
- Preceded by: Sudhir Mungantiwar

Minister of State Excise Government of Maharashtra
- In office 7 November 2009 – 28 September 2014
- Chief Minister: Ashok Chavan; Prithviraj Chavan
- Succeeded by: Eknath Khadse

Minister of Non-Conventional Energy Government of Maharashtra
- In office 7 November 2009 – 28 September 2014
- Chief Minister: Ashok Chavan; Prithviraj Chavan
- Preceded by: Vinay Kore
- Succeeded by: ministry defunct

Minister of Environment Government of Maharashtra
- In office November 2009 – October 2014
- Chief Minister: Ashok Chavan; Prithviraj Chavan
- Succeeded by: Ramdas Kadam
- In office November 2004 – February 2009
- Chief Minister: Vilasrao Deshmukh; Ashok Chavan

Minister of Labour Government of Maharashtra
- In office March 2005 – February 2009
- Chief Minister: Vilasrao Deshmukh; Ashok Chavan

Minister of Environment & Forest Government of Maharashtra
- In office June 1995 – May 1998
- Chief Minister: Manohar Joshi

Member of Maharashtra Legislative Assembly
- Incumbent
- Assumed office 2019
- Preceded by: Sandeep Naik
- Constituency: Airoli
- In office 2004–2014
- Preceded by: Sitaram Bhoir
- Succeeded by: Manda Mhatre
- Constituency: Belapur
- In office 1990–1999
- Preceded by: Janardan Gauri
- Succeeded by: Sitaram Bhoir
- Constituency: Belapur

Personal details
- Born: 15 September 1950 (age 75) Bonkode, Navi Mumbai
- Party: Bharatiya Janata Party (From 2019)
- Other political affiliations: Nationalist Congress Party (1999-2019); Shiv Sena (before 1999)
- Children: Sanjeev Naik; Sandeep Naik
- Profession: Politician, Businessman, Agriculturist
- Website: Official website

Ganesh Ramchandra Naik (born 15 September 1950) is an Indian politician. He is the Bharatiya Janata Party member of the Maharashtra Legislative Assembly from 150-Airoli Assembly constituency. He represented Thane constituency in the past, and was the Thane Guardian Minister in the state government. He was the minister of Labour, Excise and Environment in the previous government.

On February 9, 2023, Ganesh received the Maharashtra Gaurav Award for his contributions to social work. The award ceremony was held at the Raj Bhavan in Mumbai, where Ganesh was honored by the former Governor of Maharashtra, Bhagat Singh Koshyari.

== Biography ==
Ganesh Naik was born on 15 September 1950 in the village of Bonkode, located in Navi Mumbai, Maharashtra, India. He comes from a family of farmers and began serving the people of Navi Mumbai at a young age. He has held various positions such as a trade union leader and served on Gram Panchayats. In 1994-95, he was elected as MLA in the state of Maharashtra. During his tenure, he served as the Minister of Environment. He was re-elected as an MLA for two consecutive terms from 2004 to 2009 and 2009 to 2014. Throughout these periods, he held the position of Cabinet Minister for Excise, Environment, and New & Renewable Energies. In 2019, he was elected for a fourth term as an MLA from the Airoli constituency in Navi Mumbai. In the assembly elections conducted in November-2024 he won again with 1.5 Lakh votes leaving other contestants far behind. He is the only MLA from Airoli constituency to continue for 5 terms. He has also sworn in as a cabinet minister under Chief Minister Shri Devendra Fadanavis. He was among the top ten candidates in the election who won with a record margin. Ganesh Naik and his wife, Mandakini Naik, have two sons named Sanjeev Naik and Sandeep Naik.

== Political career ==
Ganesh Naik began his career as an MLA in 1990 with Shiv Sena. He joined the Nationalist Congress Party (NCP) in the year 1999 when Sharad Pawar founded the party. He joined the Bharatiya Janata Party in 2019.

=== Bharatiya Janata Party ===
In July 2019, Ganesh Naik, his younger son, Sandeep Naik, and over 50 corporators from the Navi Mumbai Municipal Corporation joined the Bharatiya Janata Party (BJP) in the presence of Chief Minister Devendra Fadnavis and then party's Maharashtra unit chief Chandrakant Patil at Vashi in Navi Mumbai.

=== CIDCO & Navi Mumbai ===
During the March 2023 Maharashtra State Assembly Session, Ganesh raised 245 objections and provided suggestions for Navi Mumbai's 20-year development plan, emphasizing the importance of essential civic facilities and infrastructure in different areas. He also spoke about the shortcomings of initial planning by CIDCO in the 1970s. Ganesh also pointed out that CIDCO is yet to transfer 550 amenities plots to NMMC.

=== MIDC & Navi Mumbai ===
In addition, Ganesh has urged the government to facilitate the transfer of remaining amenity plots from MIDC to NMMC for the provision of amenities in MIDC areas.

=== NMMC & Navi Mumbai ===
Ganesh's party has maintained control over the Navi Mumbai Municipal Corporation (NMMC) since its establishment in 1992. The NMMC has undertaken various municipal projects, such as the construction of the Morbe Dam, digitization of municipal schools, and the establishment of municipal hospitals.

=== Janta Darbars (People’s Court) ===
Ganesh gained recognition as the first minister in Maharashtra to introduce Janata Darbar, a public forum connecting citizens with civic administration to address grievances. He conducted numerous Janata Darbars in both urban and rural areas.
