= Thane Metro =

Metro line in Thane, India

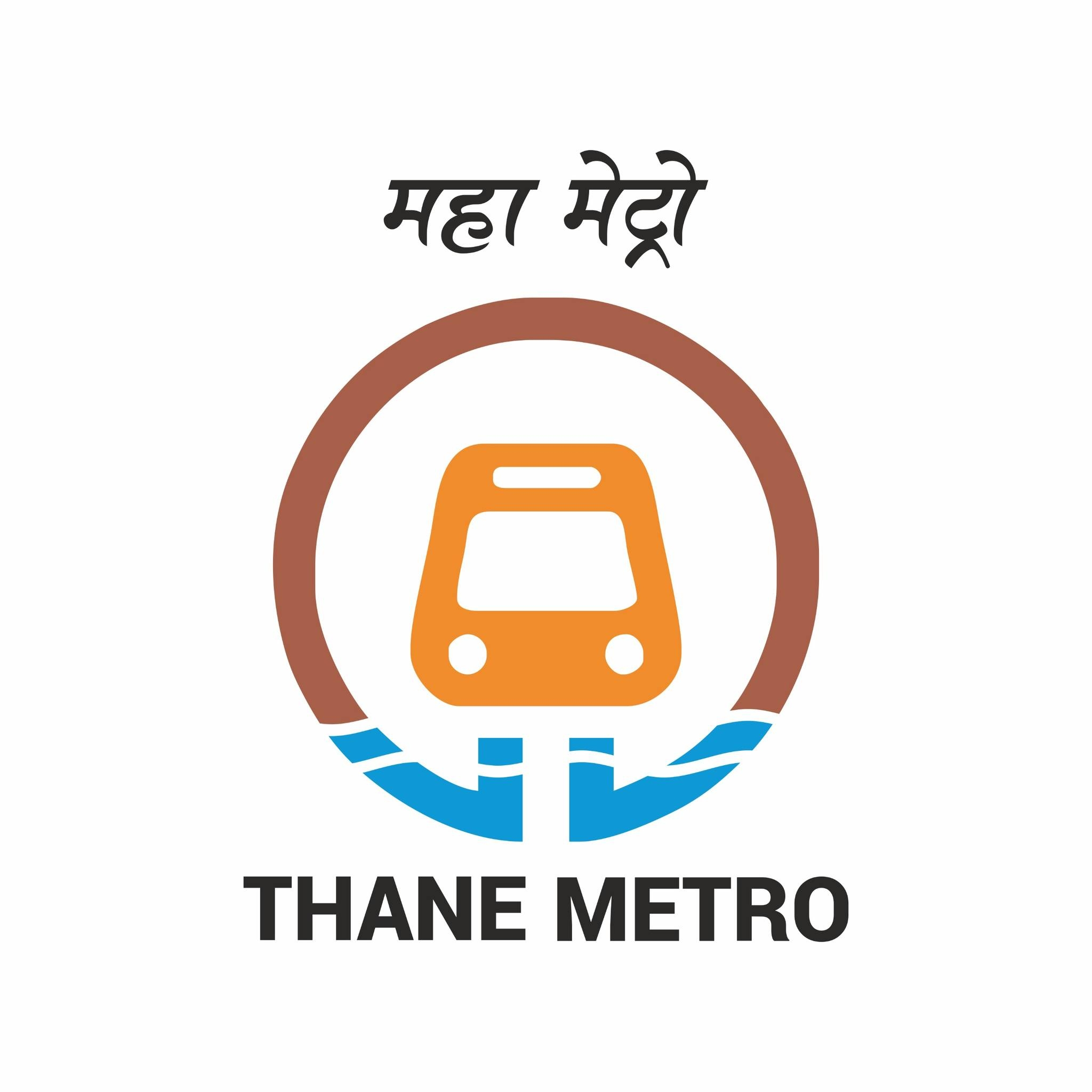

Overview
- Other name: Thane Integral Ring Metro
- Status: Under Construction
- Owner: Maharashtra Metro Rail Corporation Limited
- Locale: Thane, Maharashtra, India
- Connecting lines: Upcoming (2): Line 4 Line 5
- Stations: 22
- Website: www.thanemetrorail.com

Service
- Type: Metro
- Depot: Kasarvadavali

History
- Planned opening: 2029; 3 years' time

Technical
- Line length: 29 km (18 mi)
- Num of tracks: 2
- Character: Elevated & Underground
- Track gauge: 1,435 mm (4 ft 8 1/2 in) standard gauge
- Electrification: 750 V DC third rail

The Thane Metro or Thane Integral Ring Metro is an under-construction rapid transit line serving Thane, Maharashtra. This metro line will be the third line to run across Thane City after the under construction Line 4 and Line 5 of Mumbai Metro. The line has an approved length of 29 km (18 mi) and 22 stations. Of the total length, 3 km (1.9 mi) along with 2 stations are approved to be underground while the remaining are to be elevated. Unlike other metro lines in Mumbai Metropolitan Region, the line forms a loop running from Thane Junction via Wagle Estate, Manpada, Waghbil, Balkum, and Rabodi, to Thane Railway Station. The line was approved by the central government on 14 August 2024 and is expected to be operational by 2029.

== History ==
=== Proposal ===
The line was initially proposed by the Thane Municipal Corporation. It proposed a 29 km line running through core areas of Thane. Initially the TMC proposed the line as a heavy rail project. The initial draft was approved by the TMC in December 2018 after which it was submitted to the state government the next month. The state government approved the project on March 6. However, following financial difficulties the line was put on hold. Later in December 2020, the TMC revised the line again with several modifications. Rather than a heavy rail system, the line was converted to a light rail to reduce costs, the coach count was reduced from 6 coaches per train set to 3 coaches. This revised proposal received criticism from the public stating that a Light Rail Project would not be sufficient for a city like Thane. In 2023, however, TMC once again scrapped its proposal of a light rail system and revised the line to a Heavy rail again. The final draft saw a proposed interchange facility with the under construction Line 4 and Line 5 of Mumbai Metro. It also proposed the line to go underground near the Thane Railway Station and CIDCO Bus Terminal. The line was finally approved by the central government on 14 August 2024 and by the state government on 30 September 2024 with an estimated cost of ₹12,200 crore (US$1.3 billion). The project was initially supposed to be executed by the Thane Municipal Corporation. However, this was later modified when Maha Metro was assigned as the agency responsible for the implementation of the line. Finally the foundation for the line was laid by Prime Minister Narendra Modi on 5 October 2024.

== Cost and Funding ==
The project is estimated to cost ₹12,200.10 crore (equivalent to ₹130 billion or US$1.3 billion in 2026) with both the central and state governments expected to contribute with equal equity.

Funding
Source	Amount	%
Equity by Central Government	₹1,151.13 crore (US$120 million)	9.51
Equity by State Government	₹1,151.13 crore (US$120 million)	9.51
Sub Debt by Central Government	₹354.11 crore (US$37 million)	2.92
Sub Debt by State Government	₹354.11 crore (US$37 million)	2.92
Contribution from Local Bodies	₹200 crore (US$21 million)	1.65
Sub Debt for land and R&R by State Government	₹3,414.20 crore (US$350 million)	28.22
State Taxes by State Government	₹615.64 crore (US$64 million)	5.08
Interest During Construction by State Government	₹312.71 crore (US$32 million)	2.58
Bilateral & Multilateral Loans	₹4,515.73 crore (US$470 million)	37.32
PPP Component	₹131.34 crore (US$14 million)	1.08
Total	₹12,100.10 crore (US$1.3 billion)	100

== Construction ==
=== Tendering ===
Maha Metro has started the tendering process for the line following the approval from the Central and State government.

Thane Metro
Pre Construction Activity
Tendering	Section	Activity	Successful Bid / Cost	Contractor	Award
T-002/DDC-01/2024	Dr. Kashinath Ghanekar Natyagraha - Waterfront	Detailed Design Consultant	₹1.35 crore (US$140,000)	STUP Consultants	28 Oct 2024
T1-030/DDC-04/2026	Raila Devi - Gandhi Nagar	Detailed Design Consultant	Bidding Underway		
T1-031/DDC-05/2026	Azad Nagar Bus Stop - Shivaji Chowk Metro Stations	Detailed Design Consultant	Bidding Underway		
T1-011/DDC-02/2025	Kasarvadavali Depot	Detailed Design Consultant	Bidding Underway		
T1-024/DDC-03/2025	A) Architecture, Tunnel Ventilation System, Environmental Control System & Building Management System. B) Thane Junction - New Thane (Underground Section including ramps)	Detailed Design Consultant	Bidding Underway		
T1-004/Consul-01/2024	General Consultant		₹142.03 crore (US$15 million)	AECOM India	21 April 2026
T1-006/S&E-01/2024	Environmental Impact Assessment & Environmental Management Plan		Bidding Underway		
T1-007/S&E-02/2024	Social Impact Assessment & Rehabilitation & Resettlement (R&R Policy) Plan		Bidding Underway		
T1-019/Consul-05/2025	Engagement of General Consultants		₹179.86 crore (US$19 million)	AECOM India-Nippon Koei JV	3 July 2026
T1-037/ADM-03/2026	Appointment of Public Relation (PR) agency		Bidding Underway		
Total			₹323.24 crore (US$34 million)		
Civil Work
Package	Section	Length	Successful Bid / Cost	Contractor	Award
T1-015/C-01/2025	Viaduct from Raila Devi to Shivaji Chowk	20.527 km (12.755 mi)	₹1,415 crore (US$150 million)	H.G. Infra & Kalpaturu JV	2 Dec 2025
T1-023/C-02/2025	Six Stations from Manpada to Patlipada	Bidding Underway			
T1-030/DDC-04	Six Stations from Raila Devi to Gandhi Nagar	Bidding Underway			
T1-030/DDC-05	Seven Stations from Azad Nagar Bus Stop to Shivaji Chowk	Bidding Underway			
TBD	Underground Section	Tenders to be invited			
Total			₹1,415 crore (US$150 million)		
Total Cost			₹1,738.24 crore (US$180 million)		

== Stations ==
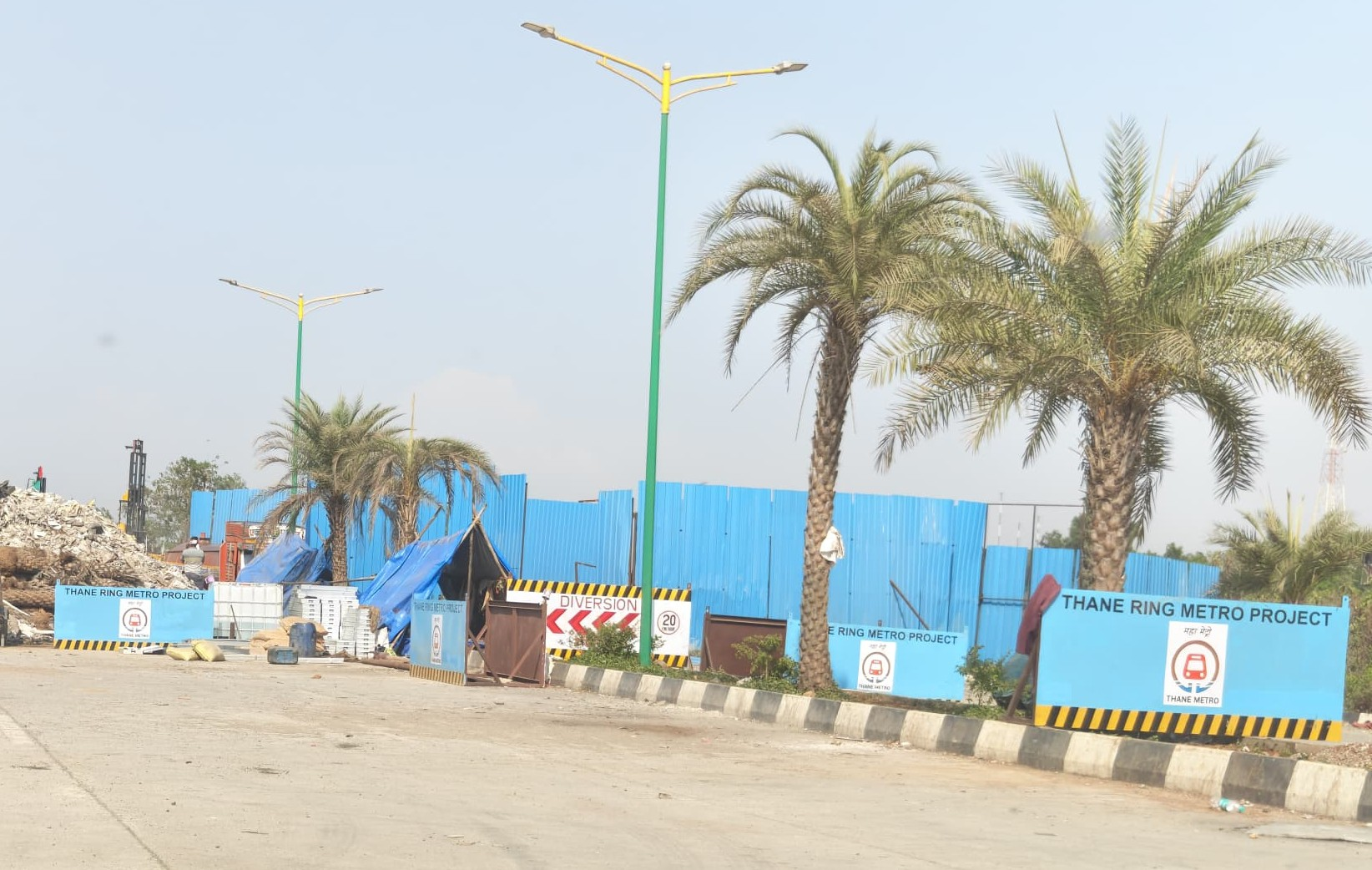
Under construction priority route near Waterfront.

The line has 22 stations. Unlike other metro lines in Mumbai, the Thane Metro is to be operational as a loop service. Of the 22 stations, 20 stations are to be elevated while the 2 stations near the Thane Railway Station are to be underground. The line has interchanges with the under construction Line 4 and Line 5 of Mumbai Metro.

=== Interchanges ===
Passenger interchange facilities, connecting to other railway lines, will be provided at the following stations:

- Thane Junction (connects to the Thane Railway Station and CIDCO Bus Terminal);
- Raila Devi (connects to the under construction Line 4, which runs between Gaimukh and Bhakti Park (Wadala));
- Lokmanya Nagar Bus Depot (connects to the TMT Bus Terminal);
- Dongripada (connects to the under construction Line 4, which runs between Gaimukh and Bhakti Park (Wadala));
- Balkum Naka (connects to Line 5 which runs between Kapurbawdi and Kalyan APMC))

Thane Metro
#	Station Name		Proposed Opening	Connections	Station Layout	Platform Level Type
#	English	Marathi	Proposed Opening	Connections	Station Layout	Platform Level Type
1	Thane Junction	ठाणे जंक्शन	2029	Thane; CIDCO Bus Terminal	Underground	TBD
2	New Thane	नवीन ठाणे	2029		Underground	TBD
3	Raila Devi	रायला देवी	2029	Line 4 (Under Construction)	Elevated	TBD
4	Wagle Circle	वागळे सर्कल	2029		Elevated	TBD
5	Lokmanya Nagar Bus Depot	लोकमान्य नगर बस डेपो	2029	TMT Bus Terminal	Elevated	TBD
6	Shivai Nagar	शिवाई नगर	2029		Elevated	TBD
7	Neelkanth Terminal	नीळकंठ टर्मिनल	2029		Elevated	TBD
8	Gandhi Nagar	गांधी नगर	2029		Elevated	TBD
9	Dr. Kashinath Ghanekar Natyagruha	डॉ. काशिनाथ घाणेकर नाट्यगृह	2029		Elevated	TBD
10	Manpada	मानपाडा	2029		Elevated	TBD
11	Dongripada	डोंगरीपाडा	2029	Line 4 (Under Construction)	Elevated	TBD
12	Vijay Nagari	विजय नगरी	2029		Elevated	TBD
13	Waghbil	वाघबीळ	2029		Elevated	TBD
14	Water Front	वॉटर फ्रंट	2029		Elevated	TBD
15	Patlipada	पातलीपाडा	2029		Elevated	TBD
16	Azad Nagar Bus Stop	आझाद नगर बस स्टॉप	2029		Elevated	TBD
17	Manorma Nagar	मनोरमा नगर	2029		Elevated	TBD
18	Kolshet Industrial Area	कोलशेत औद्योगिक क्षेत्र	2029		Elevated	TBD
19	Balkum Naka	बाळकुम नाका	2029	Line 5 (Under Construction)	Elevated	TBD
20	Balkumpada	बाळकुमपाडा	2029		Elevated	TBD
21	Rabodi	राबोडी	2029		Elevated	TBD
22	Shivaji Chowk	शिवाजी चौक	2029		Elevated	TBD

== Infrastructure ==
=== Depot ===
The line has a proposed depot at Kasarvadavali. The depot is expected to be built on an area 18 Hectares and the tenders for the Detailed Design Consultant for the depot were invited in January 2025 under contract T1-011/DDC-02/2025.

== Future Expansion ==
=== Phase II ===
The Government of Maharashtra has appointed Maha Metro to undertake a feasibility study and prepare a Detailed Project Report (DPR) for the proposed metro corridor connecting Thane, Kalwa, Mumbra, and Diva. The proposal has received in-principle approval from the state government, and Maha Metro has been given six months to complete the study and submit the DPR.
