= Vijay Chougule =

Indian politician

Vijay Laxman Chougule
- विजय लक्ष्मण चौगुले

Leader of Opposition Navi Mumbai Municipal Corporation
- Incumbent
- Assumed office 2015

Personal details
- Born: Satara
- Party: Shiv Sena
- Relations: Mamit Chougule, Shubham Chougule
- Parent: Late. Laxman Motiram Chougule

Vijay Chougule (Marathi: विजय चौगुले) is a Shiv Sena politician from Navi Mumbai, Maharashtra. He was the Leader of Opposition of Navi Mumbai Municipal Corporation. Also was Cidco Speaker in 2008.

He is nominated himself as an independent candidate in the Maharashtra Assembly Elections 2024 for Airoli Vidhan Sabha Constituency 150.

== Positions held ==
- 2008-2014: Navi Mumbai Zilla Pramukh Shiv Sena
- 2015: Elected as corporator in Navi Mumbai Municipal Corporation
- 2015: Elected as Leader of Opposition of Navi Mumbai Municipal Corporation

== Electoral performance ==
Election	Constituency	Party	Result	Votes %	Opposition Candidate	Opposition Party	Opposition vote %	Ref
2024	Airoli	Independent	Lost	19.96%	Ganesh Naik	BJP	54.98%	
2014	Airoli	SS	Lost	32.46%	Sandeep Naik	NCP	36.64%	
2009	Airoli	SS	Lost	42.55%	Sandeep Naik	NCP	50.13%	

== See also ==
- Airoli Vidhan Sabha Constituency
- Thane Lok Sabha Constituency
