= Naresh Mhaske =

Indian politician

Naresh Ganpat Mhaske
- नरेश गणपत म्हस्के

Member of Parliament, Lok Sabha
- Incumbent
- Assumed office 4 June 2024
- Preceded by: Rajan Vichare
- Constituency: Thane

Mayor of Thane Municipal Corporation
- In office November 2019 – March 2022
- Preceded by: Meenakshi Shinde
- Succeeded by: Sharmila Gaikwad

Personal details
- Party: Shiv Sena

Naresh Ganpat Mhaske is a Shiv Sena politician from Thane district, Maharashtra. He is former Mayor of Thane Municipal Corporation.

== Positions held ==
- 2012: Elected as corporator in Thane Municipal Corporation
- 2017: Re-elected as corporator in Thane Municipal Corporation
- 2017: Elected as leader of house in Thane Municipal Corporation
- 2019: Elected as Mayor of Thane Municipal Corporation
- 2024: Elected as Member of Parliament from Thane Lok Sabha constituency.
