= Rajan Vichare =

Indian politician

Member of Parliament, Lok Sabha
- In office 16 May 2014 – 31 May 2024
- Preceded by: Sanjeev Naik
- Succeeded by: Naresh Mhaske
- Constituency: Thane

Member of the Maharashtra Legislative Assembly
- In office 22 October 2009 – 15 May 2014
- Preceded by: Eknath Shinde
- Succeeded by: Sanjay Mukund Kelkar
- Constituency: Thane

Personal details
- Born: Rajan Baburao Vichare; 1 August 1961 (age 65) Thane, Maharashtra, India
- Party: Shiv Sena (UBT) (2022-present)
- Other political affiliations: Shiv Sena (till 2022)
- Spouse: Nandini Vichare (m. 1991)
- Children: 2
- Occupation: Politician

Rajan Baburao Vichare (born 1 August 1961) is an Indian politician belonging to the Shiv Sena (Uddhav Balasaheb Thackeray). He has served as the Member of Parliament for Thane for two consecutive terms from 2014 to 2024. Previously, he has served as a Member of the Maharashtra Legislative Assembly for Thane from 2009 to 2014, and as the Mayor of Thane from 2005 to 2007.

== Political career ==
- 2005: Became Mayor of Thane Municipal Corporation.
- 2009: Elected as Maharashtra Legislative Assembly from Thane.
- 2014: Elected as Member of Parliament, Lok Sabha for Thane (1st Term).
- 2019: Re-elected as Member of Parliament, Lok Sabha for Thane (2nd Term).
- 2022: Aligned with the Shiv Sena (Uddhav Balasaheb Thackeray) faction following the split in the Shiv Sena.
- 2024: Unsuccessfully contested the Thane Lok Sabha election for a third consecutive term.
- 2024: Subsequently contested the Thane Assembly election but was defeated.
