= Anand Paranjpe =

Indian politician and industrialist

Anand Prakash Paranjape

Member of Parliament, Lok Sabha
- In office 16 May 2009 – 16 May 2014
- Preceded by: Constituency established
- Succeeded by: Dr. Shrikant Shinde
- Constituency: Kalyan
- In office 2008–2009
- Preceded by: Prakash Paranjape
- Succeeded by: Sanjeev Naik
- Constituency: Thane

Personal details
- Born: 16 May 1970 (age 56) Thane, Maharashtra
- Party: Shiv Sena (2026-Present), (1988-2014)
- Other political affiliations: Nationalist Congress Party (2014-2026)
- Spouse: Smt. Sonal Paranjpe

Anand Prakash Paranjpe (Marathi: आनंद प्रकाश परांजपे) is an industrialist and an elected member of the 15th Lok Sabha from Kalyan in Maharashtra, then representing the Shiv Sena Party. He joined the Nationalist Congress Party before the 2014 general elections.

== Background ==
Anand Prakash Paranjpe was born on 16 May 1970 to Mother Supriya Paranjpe and Father Paranjape Prakash Vishvanath, who was also a member of the Shiv Sena party and served as a member of the Lok Sabha from 1996 until his death in 2008.

== Education ==
Anand Paranjpe has a B.E in Mechanical Engineering and has done his MBA in Marketing, both from Pune University. He is fluent in Marathi, English and Hindi languages.

== Career ==
Anand Paranjpe won the Lok Sabha seat from Kalyan, Maharashtra, India in the 2009 Lok Sabha elections defeating Nationalist Congress Party candidate Vasant Davkhare. He was the only Shiv Sena Member of Parliament to be elected from the Mumbai Thane region in the 15th Lok Sabha and since his election, had been appointed as the Secretary of the Shiv Sena party. He was also a member of 14th Lok Sabha by winning the by-elections in May 2008 from Thane (Lok Sabha constituency). He lost the 2014 general election from Kalyan constituency on Nationalist Congress Party's ticket against Shiv Sena's Shrikant Shinde with a margin of 250,749 votes. He got 190,143 votes and Shrikant Shinde got 440,892 votes.

== Personal life ==
Anand Paranjpe married Sonal Paranjpe in January 1999 and they both live in Naupada, Thane.
