= Kalyan Lok Sabha constituency =

Lok Sabha constituency in Maharashtra

Coordinates: 19.2°N 73.1°E

Kalyan Lok Sabha
- Lok Sabha constituency
- Kalyan Lok Sabha Constituency map

Constituency details
- Country: India
- Region: Western India
- State: Maharashtra
- Assembly constituencies: Ambernath; Ulhasnagar; Kalyan East; Dombivali; Kalyan Rural; Mumbra-Kalwa
- Established: 2008 (18 years ago)
- Total electors: 20,82,221
- Reservation: None

Member of Parliament
- 18th Lok Sabha
- Incumbent Shrikant Shinde
- Party: SHS
- Alliance: NDA
- Elected year: 2024
- Preceded by: Anand Paranjape

Kalyan Lok Sabha constituency is one of the 48 Lok Sabha (lower house of the Indian Parliament) constituencies in Maharashtra state in western India. This constituency was created on 19 February 2008 as a part of the implementation of the Presidential notification based on the recommendations of the Delimitation Commission of India constituted on 12 July 2002. It first held elections in 2009 and its first member of parliament (MP) was Anand Paranjpe of Shiv Sena. As of the 2014 elections, this constituency is represented by Shrikant Shinde also of Shiv Sena.

== Assembly segments ==
At present, after the implementation of the Presidential notification on delimitation on 19 February 2008, kalyan Lok Sabha constituency comprises six Vidhan Sabha (legislative assembly) segments. These segments are:

| # | Name | District | Member | Party | Leading (in 2024) |
|---|---|---|---|---|---|
| 140 | Ambernath (SC) | Thane | Balaji Kinikar | SHS | SHS |
| 141 | Ulhasnagar | Thane | Kumar Ailani | BJP | SHS |
| 142 | Kalyan East | Thane | Sulabha Gaikwad | BJP | SHS |
| 143 | Dombivli | Thane | Ravindra Chavan | BJP | SHS |
| 144 | Kalyan Rural | Thane | Rajesh More | SHS | SHS |
| 149 | Mumbra Kalwa | Thane | Jitendra Awhad | NCP-SP | SS(UBT) |

== Members of Parliament ==
| Year | Name | Party |
|---|---|---|
Till 2008 : Constituency did not exist
| 2009 | Anand Paranjape | Shiv Sena |
| 2014 | Shrikant Shinde | Shiv Sena |
| 2019 | Shrikant Shinde | Shiv Sena |
| 2024 | Shrikant Shinde | Shiv Sena |

== Election results ==
Vote share of Winning candidates
| 2024 | 56.38% |
| 2019 | 62.87% |
| 2014 | 53.49% |
| 2009 | 39.00% |

=== 2024 ===
2024 Indian general election: Kalyan
| Party | Candidate | Votes | % | ±% |
|---|---|---|---|---|
| SHS | Shrikant Shinde | 589,636 | 56.38 | |
| SS(UBT) | Vaishali Darekar-Rane | 380,492 | 36.39 | |
| VBA | Mo. Shb. Sk. Sulemani Thakur | 18,741 | 1.79 | ▼5.58 |
| NOTA | None of the Above | 11,686 | 1.12 | ▼0.34 |
| BSP | Prashant Ramesh Ingle | 11,341 | 1.08 | |
| IND | 15 Independent Candidates | 17,829 | 1.70 | |
| OTH | 9 Other Party Candidates | 16,011 | 1.53 | |
| Majority | | 209,144 | 19.99 | ▼18.69 |
| Turnout | | 10,47,247 | 50.28 | ▲4.97 |
| SHS gain from SS | | Swing | | |

=== 2019 ===
2019 Indian general election: Kalyan
| Party | Candidate | Votes | % | ±% |
|---|---|---|---|---|
| SS | Shrikant Shinde | 559,723 | 62.87 | ▲9.38 |
| NCP | Babaji Balaram Patil | 215,380 | 24.19 | ▲1.12 |
| VBA | Sanjay Hedaoo | 65,572 | 7.37 | |
| NOTA | None of the Above | 13,012 | 1.46 | ▲0.35 |
| BSP | Ravindra (Pintu) Kene | 9,627 | 1.08 | ▼1.30 |
| IND | 15 Independent Candidates | 14,226 | 1.60 | |
| OTH | 9 Other Party Candidates | 12,773 | 1.43 | |
| Majority | | 344,343 | 38.68 | ▲8.26 |
| Turnout | | 890,692 | 45.31 | ▲2.37 |
| SS hold | | Swing | | |

=== 2014 ===
2014 Indian general election: Kalyan
| Party | Candidate | Votes | % | ±% |
|---|---|---|---|---|
| SS | Shrikant Shinde | 440,892 | 53.49 | ▲14.49 |
| NCP | Anand Paranjape | 190,143 | 23.07 | ▼11.49 |
| MNS | Pramod Ratan Patil | 122,349 | 14.84 | ▼3.89 |
| AAP | Naresh Arvind Thakur | 20,347 | 2.47 | |
| BSP | Kiratkar Dayanand Tulshiram | 19,643 | 2.38 | ▼0.50 |
| NOTA | None of the Above | 9,185 | 1.11 | |
| IND | 7 Independent Candidates | 10,695 | 1.30 | |
| OTH | 6 Other Party Candidates | 10,942 | 1.33 | |
| Majority | | 250,749 | 30.42 | ▲25.98 |
| Turnout | | 825,414 | 42.94 | ▲8.64 |
| SS hold | | Swing | | |

=== 2009 ===
2009 Indian general election: Kalyan
| Party | Candidate | Votes | % | ±% |
|---|---|---|---|---|
| SS | Anand Paranjape | 212,476 | 39.00 | |
| NCP | Vasant Davkhare | 188,274 | 34.56 | |
| MNS | Vaishali Darekar-Rane | 102,063 | 18.73 | |
| BSP | Khan Kamruddin Gani | 15,709 | 2.88 | |
| BBM | S. S. Salve | 3,242 | 0.60 | |
| IND | 10 Independent Candidates | 17,010 | 3.12 | |
| OTH | 5 Other Party Candidates | 6,054 | 1.11 | |
| Majority | | 24,202 | 4.44 | |
| Turnout | | 544,828 | 34.30 | |
| SS win (new seat) | | | | |

== See also ==
- Kalyan
- Thane district
- Thane Lok Sabha constituency
- List of constituencies of the Lok Sabha
