= Kopri =

Kopri Kopri Colony
- Neighborhood of Thane city
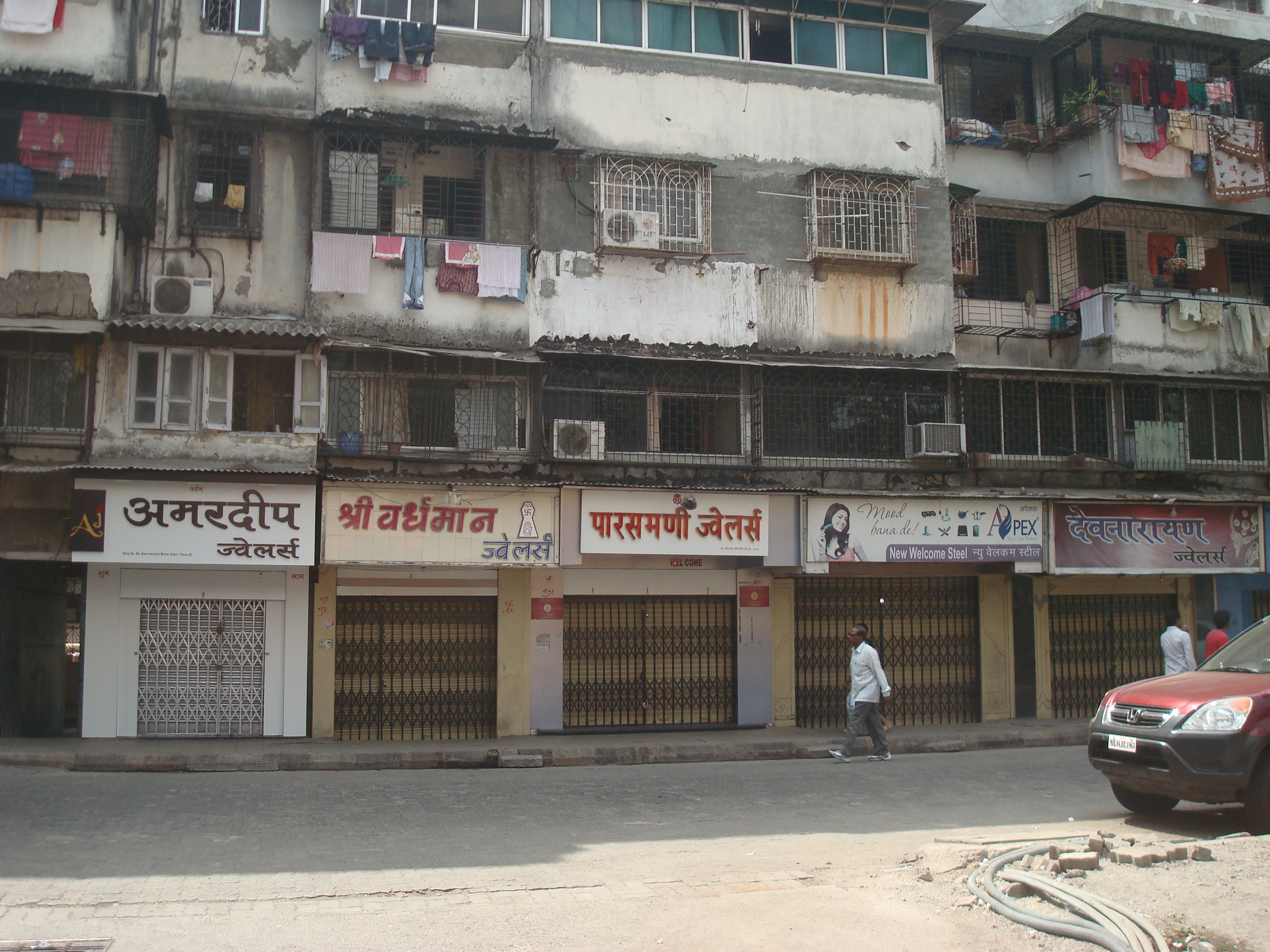
- Shops in Kopri (closed for LBT protests in May 2013)
- Interactive map of Kopri
- Coordinates: 31°17′N 77°25′E
- Country: India
- State: Maharashtra
- District: Thane

Government
  - Body: Thane Municipal Corporation (TMC)
- Demonym: Koprikar

Languages
  - Official: Marathi
- Time zone: UTC+5:30 (IST)
- PIN: 400603
- Vehicle registration: MH-04
- Nearest city: Mulund and Kalwa
- Website: https://thanecity.gov.in/tmc/CitizenHome.html

Kopri, primarily a residential colony, is situated on the east side of Thane railway station, Maharashtra, India.
