= Sanjay More =

Indian politician

- संजय मोरे

Mayor of Thane
- In office 2014–2017
- Preceded by: Harishchandra Patil
- Succeeded by: Meenakshi Shinde

Personal details
- Party: Shiv Sena

Sanjay Bhaurao More (Marathi: संजय भाऊराव मोरे) is Shiv Sena Politician from Thane district, Maharashtra. He was the Mayor of Thane Municipal Corporation from 2014 to 2017. He has been elected to Thane Municipal Corporation for three terms from 1997 to 2012.

== Positions held ==
- 1997: Elected as corporator in Thane Municipal Corporation
- 2007: Re-elected as corporator in Thane Municipal Corporation
- 2012: Re-elected as corporator in Thane Municipal Corporation
- 2015: Elected as Mayor of Thane Municipal Corporation
