= Sandeep Naik =

Indian politician

Sandeep Ganesh Naik
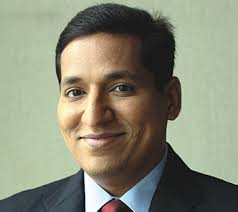

Member of Legislative Assembly Maharashtra
- In office 22 October 2009 – 24 October 2019
- Preceded by: Constituency created
- Succeeded by: Ganesh Naik
- Constituency: Airoli

Personal details
- Born: 4 August 1978 (age 48)
- Party: Bharatiya Janata Party (Dec 2025-Present)
- Occupation: Former President, Bharatiya Janata Party, Navi Mumbai

Sandeep Ganesh Naik (born August 4, 1978) is a former member of the Maharashtra Legislative Assembly. He rose to prominence in the state after winning the 2009 assembly elections. He is the son of BJP politician Ganesh Naik, who served as the State Excise Minister and New & Renewable Energy Minister. Sandeep Naik's elder brother Sanjeev Naik is a former MP.

== Political career ==
In April 2005, Sandeep Naik started his political career as a corporator in the Navi Mumbai Municipal Corporation (NMMC). In 2007, he was elected unopposed as the chairman of the standing committee of NMMC. He officially assumed his duties as chairman on March 8, 2007.

=== Vidhan Sabha election 2009 ===
In the 2009 Maharashtra Vidhan Sabha elections, Sandeep secured a victory in the Airoli Assembly constituency, defeating the Shiv Sena-BJP candidate, Vijay Laxman Chougule, by a margin of 11,957 votes. Sandeep received a total of 79,075 votes out of the 1,57,751 votes cast, while Vijay Chougule got 67,118 votes.

=== Vidhan Sabha election 2014 ===
In the elections for the Airoli constituency, major parties of Maharashtra, including Congress, NCP, BJP, and Shiv Sena, fielded their respective candidates. Incumbent Sandeep successfully retained his seat by defeating his closest competitor, Vijay Laxman Chougule from the Shiv Sena party. Sandeep secured victory with a margin of 8,725 votes, receiving a total of 76,444 votes, while Chougule obtained 67,719 votes. Vaibhav Tukaram Naik of the BJP secured the third position with 46,405 votes.

=== Bharatiya Janata Party ===
In July 2019, Sandeep and more than 50 other members of the Navi Mumbai Municipal Corporation officially joined the Bharatiya Janata Party (BJP) in a ceremony attended by then Chief Minister Devendra Fadnavis and then Maharashtra unit chief Chandrakant Patil in Vashi, Navi Mumbai.

On 19 July 2023, the BJP party appointed Sandeep Naik as the Navi Mumbai District President. The announcement was made by the Maharashtra State BJP President Chandrashekhar Bawankule.

Following the appointment, Sandeep led the party's initiatives in Navi Mumbai, like Meri Maati Mera Desh and Maha Vijay 2024 campaigns.

== Initiatives ==
=== Ganesh Naik Charitable Trust ===
Sandeep heads the Ganesh Charitable Trust, which provided essential materials in vehicles to assist flood victims from various parts of Navi Mumbai in 2021.

=== Green Hope ===
Green Hope, an NGO founded in 2007 and led by Sandeep as its president, organizes cleaning drives and tree planting initiatives across Navi Mumbai to support environmental preservation and restoration.

=== Navi Mumbai Shikshan Sankul ===
Navi Mumbai Shikshan Sankul was established by Sandeep to focus on education in Navi Mumbai, particularly for economically disadvantaged students. The foundation launched its mock board exams ‘Sarav Pariksha’ for students appearing for SSC board level in Maharashtra. The mock board exams aims for 10th-grade students to build confidence for the SSC exam.

=== Navi Mumbai Krida Sankul ===
Established in 1989 by Ganesh Naik, Navi Mumbai Krida Sankul is currently presided over by Sandeep. The organization was created to provide opportunities for budding sports talents in Navi Mumbai. In December 2013, the Navi Mumbai Krida Sankul hosted the Navi Mumbai Krida Mahotsav event, which saw participation from over 14,000 athletes representing 150 schools and colleges.
