= Shrikant Shinde =

Indian politician (born 1987)

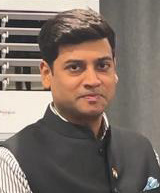
- Shinde in 2024

Member of Parliament, Lok Sabha
- Incumbent
- Assumed office 16 May 2014
- Preceded by: Anand Paranjape
- Constituency: Kalyan

Personal details
- Born: 4 February 1987 (age 39) Mumbai, Maharashtra, India
- Party: Shiv Sena (since 2023; 2014-2022)
- Other political affiliations: Balasahebanchi Shiv Sena (2022–2023)
- Spouse: Vrushali Shinde (m. 2016)
- Children: 1
- Parent(s): Eknath Shinde (father); Lata Shinde (mother)
- Education: MS Orthopaedics
- Alma mater: DY Patil Medical College
- Profession: Orthopedic Surgeon; politician

Shrikant Shinde (born 4 February 1987) is an Indian politician serving as a member of Parliament in the Lok Sabha. He represents the Kalyan constituency of Maharashtra and is a member of the Shiv Sena political party.

He is the son of Eknath Shinde, the incumbent Deputy Chief Minister of Maharashtra. At the time of his 2014 election win, he was a final-year Master's student of orthopaedics.

== Early life and education ==
Shinde is a qualified medical practitioner (MBBS followed by M.S. Orthopedics). He completed his M.S. from Dr. D Y Patil Medical College, Navi Mumbai. Shinde's family members includes his father, Eknath Shinde, mother Lata, wife Vrushali and son Rudransh. Shinde first got elected as a Member of Parliament in 2014 elections, from the Kalyan Lok Sabha constituency. He became youngest maratha Member of Parliament ever. He won the election a second time from the same constituency in May 2019.

== Positions held ==
- 2014: Elected to 16th Lok Sabha

Dr. Shrikant Shinde won the Kalyan parliamentary seat defeating Anand Paranjpe of NCP by a margin of over 2.50 lakh votes. In 2014, India witnessed its 32 first time MP's under 35. Dr. Shinde was one of the youngest Maratha MPs among others. He was 27 when elected from Kalyan Constituency, pursuing Master of Surgery. According to the Election Commission, the constituency had a total of 1,922,046 eligible voters during the 2014 Lok Sabha elections. Dr. Shinde of Shivsena Party won the seat by defeating the NCP candidate by a margin of 250,749 votes which was 30.42% of the total votes polled in the constituency. Shivsena had a vote share of 53.49% in 2014 in the seat. There were a total of 18 contestants in 2014. According to the 2014 electoral rolls, the electorate included 1,044,943 men, 876,995 women and 96 voters of the third gender.

Appointed Member of Standing Committee on Health and Family Welfare &

Committee on Violation of Protocol Norms and Contemptuous Behavior of Government Officers

From 1 September 2014 onwards, he was appointed Member of the Standing Committee on Health and Family Welfare. Later, from 15 September 2014 he was appointed Member of Committee on Violation of Protocol Norms and Contemptuous Behavior of Government Officers with Member of Lok Sabha.

- 2019: Elected to 17th Lok Sabha

Dr. Shinde won the Kalyan Lok Sabha Constituency with a margin of 3,44,343 votes which was 62.87% by defeating Babaji Balaram Patil of NCP. Dr. Shinde received 5,59,723 votes which was 24.19% from Kalyan Lok Sabha Constituency. This urban general constituency has an estimated Scheduled Caste population of 10.23% and a Scheduled Tribe population of 2.29%. The average literacy rate of Ambernath is 87.22%, Ulhasnagar 87.49%, Kalyan Dombivali 91.37%, Thane Municipal Corporation 98.41%. The seat went to the polls on Phase 4 on Monday, 29 April 2019.

Appointed Member of Standing Committee on Defence and Member of Consultative Committee, Ministry of Housing and Urban Affairs

From 13 September 2019 onwards, he was appointed Member of Standing Committee on Defence and Member of Consultative Committee, Ministry of Housing and Urban Affairs.

- 2024: Elected to 18th Lok Sabha

Shrikant Shinde, son of Chief Minister Eknath Shinde from Shiv Sena which is part of the NDA alliance, won by a margin of 2,09,144 votes from the Lok Sabha constituency of Kalyan, Maharashtra for Third Term as MP. opposite UBT candidate vaishali Darekar Rane

== Political career ==
He raised a demand that Kalyan and Dombivili stations be remodeled, during a Loksabha session in 2017.

Shinde said in a press conference that he got 110 crore sanctioned for roads in the division for Dombivli MIDC roads.

- Kalyan Ring Road Project to Connect Kalyan Rural, Titwala, Dombivli

Travelling to the urban area from Kalyan rural is hectic due to congestion on the city roads. Dr. Shinde addressed this issue and proposed the Kalyan Ring Road Project. The municipal administration has approved the proposal of a ring road going out of the city to connect the rural areas including Kalyan-Dombivali and Titwala. This ring road will be constructed through MMRDA. However, the space required for this will have to be acquired by the municipal administration. Since most of this ring road passes along the creek shore, it falls into the CRZ area.

In the first phase of the project, a 20 km long road from Durgamata Chowk to Titwala will be constructed. In the second phase, a 13 km long road from Durgamata Chowk to Mankoli is proposed. The municipal administration has claimed that this road will help in clearing the traffic congestion in the city. In the next phase, a road connecting 27 villages will be constructed.

- Kalyan-Shilphata Road

Unending traffic on Kalyan-Shilphata Road was a huge issue for commuters' daily travel. Dr. Shinde along with father & cabinet minister of urban Development and Public Works Eknath Shinde announced the expansion of Kalyan-Shilphata Road. The old road was of 4 lanes and new concrete road was made up of 6 lanes and will have 14 junctions and 31 bus stops. The entire project cost Rs 213 crore that includes two Rail Over Bridges one at Desai Gaon near Palava and second at Patripul in Kalyan.

- Airoli-Katai Freeway

To decongest the traffic on Shilphata road Airoli - Katai Freeway project is under construction. It is also called Airoli-Katai Unnat Marg. It is an important project which will cut travel time from Airoli to Katai and hardly 10 minutes will take time to reach the location. Currently, the project is under construction and Dr.Shinde is aiming to finish the construction work before the targeted date.

- Waterway Transport Project (Kalyan-Thane-Mumbai)

He presented the project of waterway transport for traffic-free travel in less time. The waterway transport project got approved by the Central Government. The central government has sanctioned Rs 453 crore for the first phase. Under this, freight traffic will be the same as passenger transport. The first phase of this ambitious project is the waterway connecting Kalyan-Thane-Vasai. Dr. Shrikant Shinde and Rajan Vichare followed up with the Central Government. As the Guardian Minister of the district, Eknath Shinde submitted a detailed plan of the project to the Center through Thane Municipal Corporation. The first phase includes Kalyan-Thane-Vasai, the second phase includes Navi Mumbai and Mumbai.

Renovation of Hospitals and Other Services

Dr. Shinde took initiative to strengthen the medical facilities in Kalyan Constituency. He followed up on the renovation of ESIC Hospital (Ulhasnagar) equipped with 100 beds & all upgraded machinery, MRI and CT Scan facility at reasonable cost in KDMC Hospital and Chhatrapati Shivaji Hospital Kalwa, Dialysis Centers in Shastrinagar & Netivali (Dombivali). Based on the PPP model, CT Scan and MRI will be available for the public at a reasonable price in Shastrinagar and Rukminibai Hospital. Sanitary Napkin vending machine set up at Zilha Parishad's School.

One Rupee Clinic & COVID-19

As COVID-19 cases were increasing in Kalyan Constituency, every patient should get consultation and proper treatment. To make this possible, Dr. Shinde took initiative to make place available for One Rupee Clinic with Kalyan Dombivli Municipal Corporation (KDMC) so that needy people should get covid treatment at lowest cost. Dr Rahul Ghule, MD Magic Dil Health managing director, is managing eight covid care centers and hospitals comprising more Thane 2500 beds in Mumbai Metropolitan Region. The One rupee clinic team and KDMC started free thermal screening in the KDMC hotspots and containment zones to avoid increasing infection, as one should get early detection. They are managing Savlaram Covid Care Centre and Patidar Bhavan Covid Care Centre at Dombivali, Sai Nirvana Covid Care Centre at Kalyan and Rukmini Covid Care Centre at Titwala set up by Kalyan Dombivli Municipal Corporation.

27 Villages benefited by AMRUT YOJANA

Under this scheme 27 villages of Kalyan Rural have benefited by a water supply project. Rs 180 crores had been given to the 27 villages for water supply and sanitation purposes under the AMRUT scheme. The area of 27 villages is 40 square kilometers. Under this scheme, 28 water tanks, 12 pumps and 2 outlets as well as 223 km of waterways will be constructed for a population of about two and a half lakh. The central and state governments will jointly contribute half of the Rs 180 crore scheme and the remaining half will be borne by the municipality.

Government Medical College in Ambernath

In emergency, the public of Ambernath, Kalyan, Ulhasnagar, Badlapur and other parts of Thane District used to travel far at J.J. Hospital, K.E.M Hospital. Dr. Shinde proposed the project of the Medical College in Ambernath. Project was approved by the Medical Education Minister Amit Deshmukh and the construction will start soon.

== Work ==
Dr. Shinde served two years of practice as an Orthopaedic surgeon at Shivaji Hospital at Kalwa.

== Social work ==
He has established a Doctor Shrikant Shinde Foundation which has collaborated with Shiv Sena to arrange free medical camps in Sindhudurg district. The Foundation donated one ambulance in Kolhapur to Sambhaji Raje's foundation during the COVID-19 pandemic in India.

He organises 'Shiv Mandir Art Festival' in Ambernath (Kalyan Constituency).

== Award ==
- Bharat Gaurav Award 2021

== See also ==
- Lok Sabha
