= Pratap Sarnaik =

Indian politician

- प्रताप सरनाईक
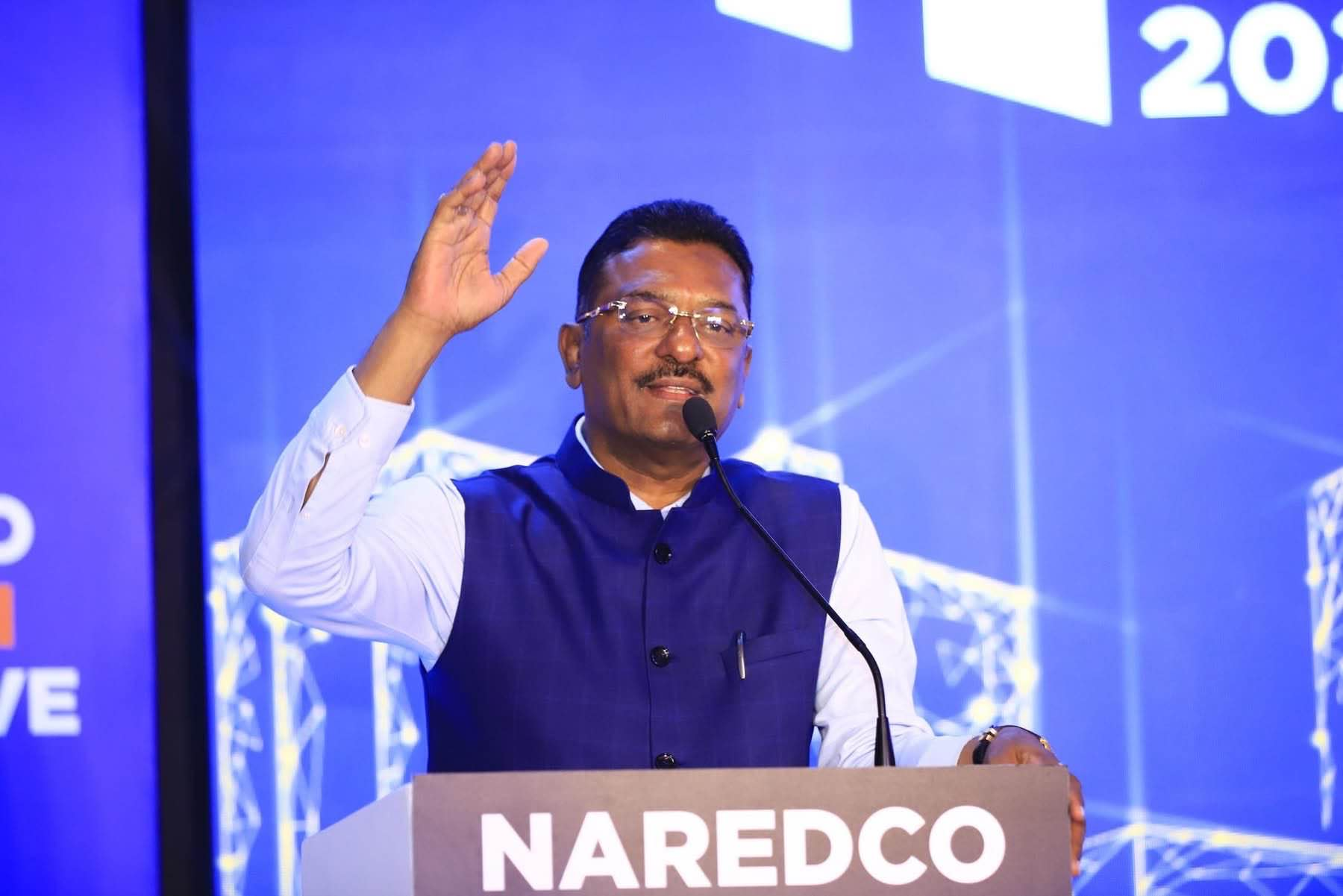
- Pratap Sarnaik in 2025

Cabinet Minister Government of Maharashtra
- Incumbent
- Assumed office 15 December 2024
- Minister: Transport
- Governor: C. P. Radhakrishnan; Acharya Devvrat additional charge
- Cabinet: Third Fadnavis ministry
- Chief Minister: Devendra Fadnavis
- Deputy CM: Eknath Shinde; Ajit Pawar (till his demise in 2026) Sunetra Pawar (from 2026)
- Guardian Minister: Dharashiv district
- Preceded by: Eknath Shinde

Member of the Maharashtra Legislative Assembly
- Incumbent
- Assumed office 2009
- Preceded by: constituency established
- Constituency: Ovala-Majiwada

Personal details
- Born: Pratap Baburao Sarnaik; 25 April 1964 (age 62) Wardha, Dist. Wardha District
- Party: Shiv Sena (2008–Present)
- Other political affiliations: Nationalist Congress Party (1999-2008); Indian National Congress (Till 1999)
- Spouse: Parisha Sarnaik
- Children: Vihang Sarnaik; Purvesh Sarnaik
- Education: Pendharkar College, Dombivli; University of Mumbai
- Occupation: Politician, Chairman of Vihang Group
- Profession: Real Estate Developer
- Website: www.pratapsarnaik.com

Pratap Baburao Sarnaik is a politician from Thane, Maharashtra, India. At present he is Member of the Legislative Assembly – Ovala-Majiwada Assembly constituency, Communication Leader- Mira-Bhayandar, Shivsena, Chairman- Vihang Group of companies, Founder & President- Sanskruti Yuva Pratishthan.

== Biography and political life ==
Pratap Sarnaik was born in Maharashtra in a middle-class family in 1964 at Wardha to Indirabai & Baburao Sarnaik. His father Sri Baburao Sarnaik migrated to Mumbai. Pratap Sarnaik attended the Pendharkar College in Dombivli. A liking for social service made him join the students movement during his college days. Pratap Sarnaik started his political career with the Indian National Congress Party and left the Congress in 1999 and joined the Nationalist Congress Party (NCP). He left the NCP in November 2008 and joined the Shiv Sena.

He won the General elections, from Ovala-Majiwada Assembly constituency as a Shiv Sena candidate with 52,373 votes. His 2 sons, Vihang and Purvesh are key members of Yuva Sena. Younger son Purvesh Sarnaik is Secretary of Yuva Sena and actively involved in its activities and campaigns. His wife Mrs. Parisha Sarnaik too is a local corporator in Thane Municipal Corporation representing Ward 29.

== Social Activities ==
Sanskruti Yuva Pratishthan, headed by Pratap Sarnaik organizes Dahi Handi at Vartak Nagar, Thane for the past many years. Various Dahi Handi teams from all over Mumbai-Thane flocked to compete for the Rs 25 lakh Handi in August 2011.

== Business ==
=== Real Estate ===
As Chairman of Vihang Group of companies, he is involved in many real estate projects in Thane City since 1989. Few of residential/ commercial projects executed are Vihang Shantivan, Vihang Garden, Srushti Complex, Vihang Residency, Vihang Tower, Vihang Vihar, Vihang Park, Raunak Tower, Vihang Arcade & Raunak Arcade.

=== Hospitality ===
Pratap Sarnaik owns Hotel Vihang's Inn – a 3-Star business hotel at Thane. The group also owns Vihang's Palm club which offers swimming pool, health club, jacuzzi and squash.

== Positions held ==
- 2009: Elected to Maharashtra Legislative Assembly
- 2014: Re-elected to Maharashtra Legislative Assembly
- 2019: Re-elected to Maharashtra Legislative Assembly
- 2024: Re-elected to Maharashtra Legislative Assembly
