= Meenakshi Shinde =

Indian politician

Mayor of Thane
- In office 2017 – September 2019
- Preceded by: Sanjay More
- Succeeded by: Naresh Mhaske

Personal details
- Born: 4 June
- Party: Shiv Sena

Meenakshi Shinde is Shiv Sena Politician from Thane district, Maharashtra. She is the former Mayor of Thane Municipal Corporation. She has been elected to Thane Municipal Corporation for three consecutive terms from 2007 to 2017.

== Positions held ==
- 2007: Elected as corporator in Thane Municipal Corporation
- 2012: Re-elected as corporator in Thane Municipal Corporation
- 2017: Re-elected as corporator in Thane Municipal Corporation
- 2017: Elected as Mayor of Thane Municipal Corporation
