= Shamrao Vishnu Parulekar =

Indian politician

Shamrao Vishnu Parulekar (born 5 October 1902) was an Indian politician and leader of the Communist Party of India. He represented Thane constituency in 2nd Lok Sabha.

He was a member of the Servants of India Society (1928—40) and Workers' Delegate to the International Labour Conference held in Geneva in 1938. He was also a member of the Bombay Legislative Assembly.
