= Morbe Dam =

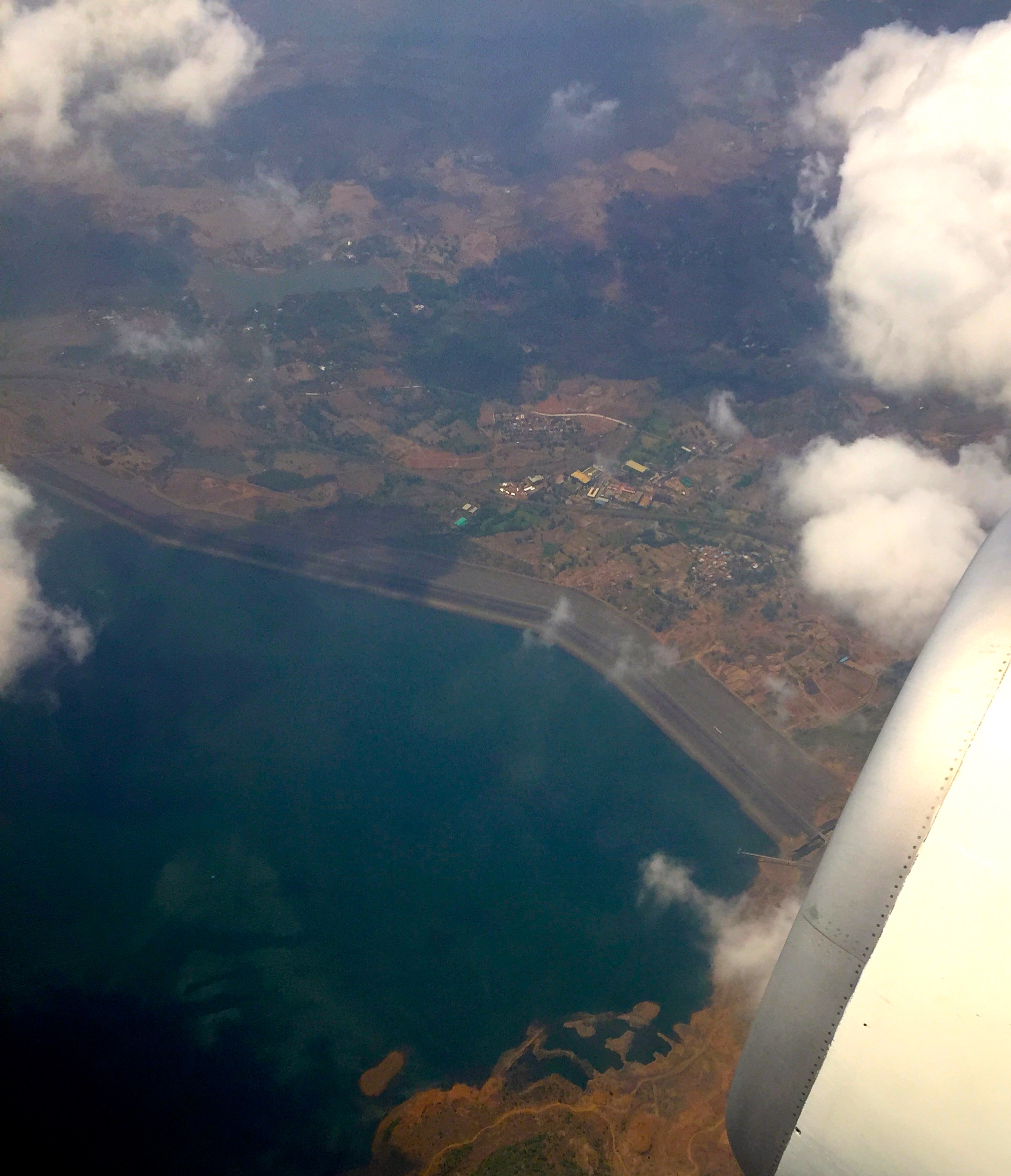
- An aerial image of the dam and lake.

- Location within Maharashtra
- Official name: Morbe Dam D04373
- Location: Khalapur
- Coordinates: 18.925773°N 73.246193°E
- Construction began: 1999
- Opening date: 2006
- Owner: Navi Mumbai Municipal Corporation

Dam and spillways
- Type of dam: Gravity
- Impounds: Dhavari river
- Height: 59.1 m (194 ft)
- Length: 3,420 m (11,220 ft)
- Dam volume: 18,075 km^{3} (4,336 cu mi)

Reservoir
- Creates: morbe
- Total capacity: 160.01 km^{3} (38.39 cu mi)
- Surface area: 9,780 km^{2} (3,780 sq mi)

Morbe Dam is a gravity dam on the Dhavari river near Khalapur, Raigad district in the state of Maharashtra, India. The Morbe lake is the main water source for the city of Navi Mumbai. It was built by the Water Supply and Sanitation Department of the Government of Maharashtra.

Construction of the Morbe dam began in 1999 to supply drinking water to the Navi Mumbai and Nhava Sheva regions. According to the 1981 census, about 2,897 persons living in 11 villages were affected by the project. In 2002, the Government permitted the Navi Mumbai Municipal Corporation to take over the Morbe dam.

== Specifications ==
The height of the dam above lowest foundation is 59.1 m (194 ft) while the length is 3,420 m (11,220 ft). The volume content is 18,075 km^{3} (4,336 cu mi) and gross storage capacity is 19,089.00 km^{3} (4,579.69 cu mi).Mr. A.D. More was key personnel to deliver this project successfully from Maharashtra state government.

== Purpose ==
- Water supply

== Image gallery ==
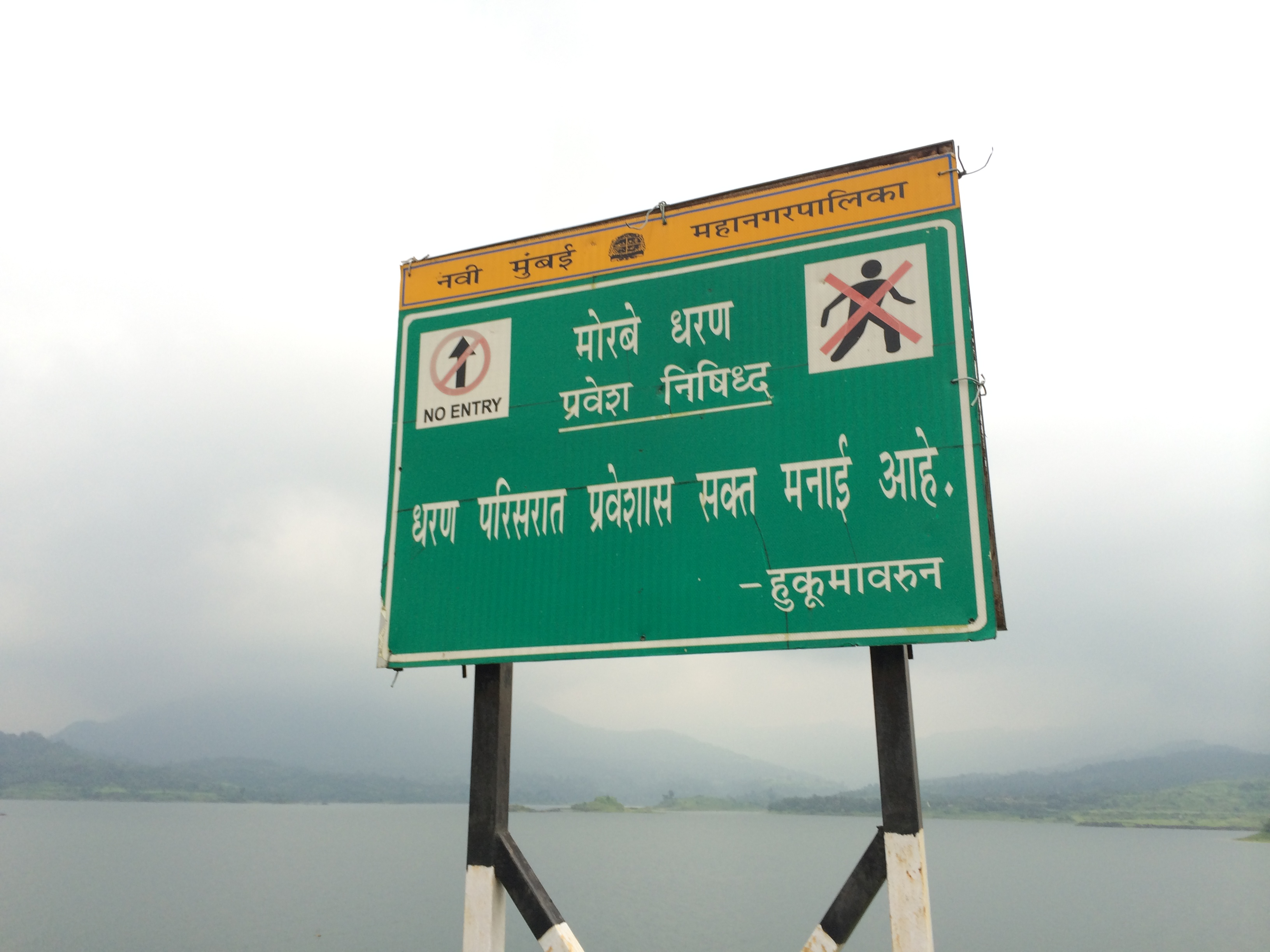
Warning Sign put up to prevent diving and unauthorized entry

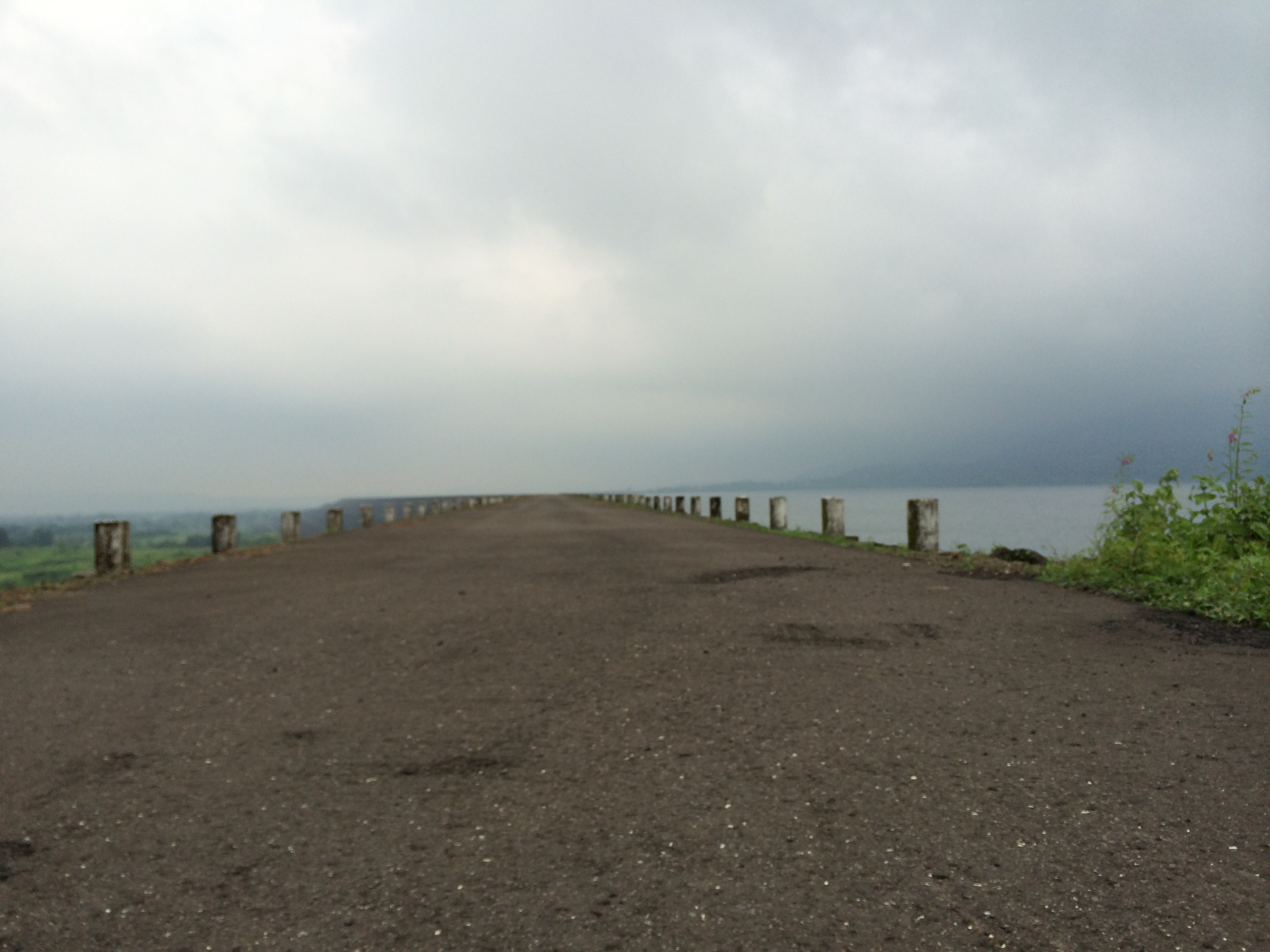
The road along the top of the dam

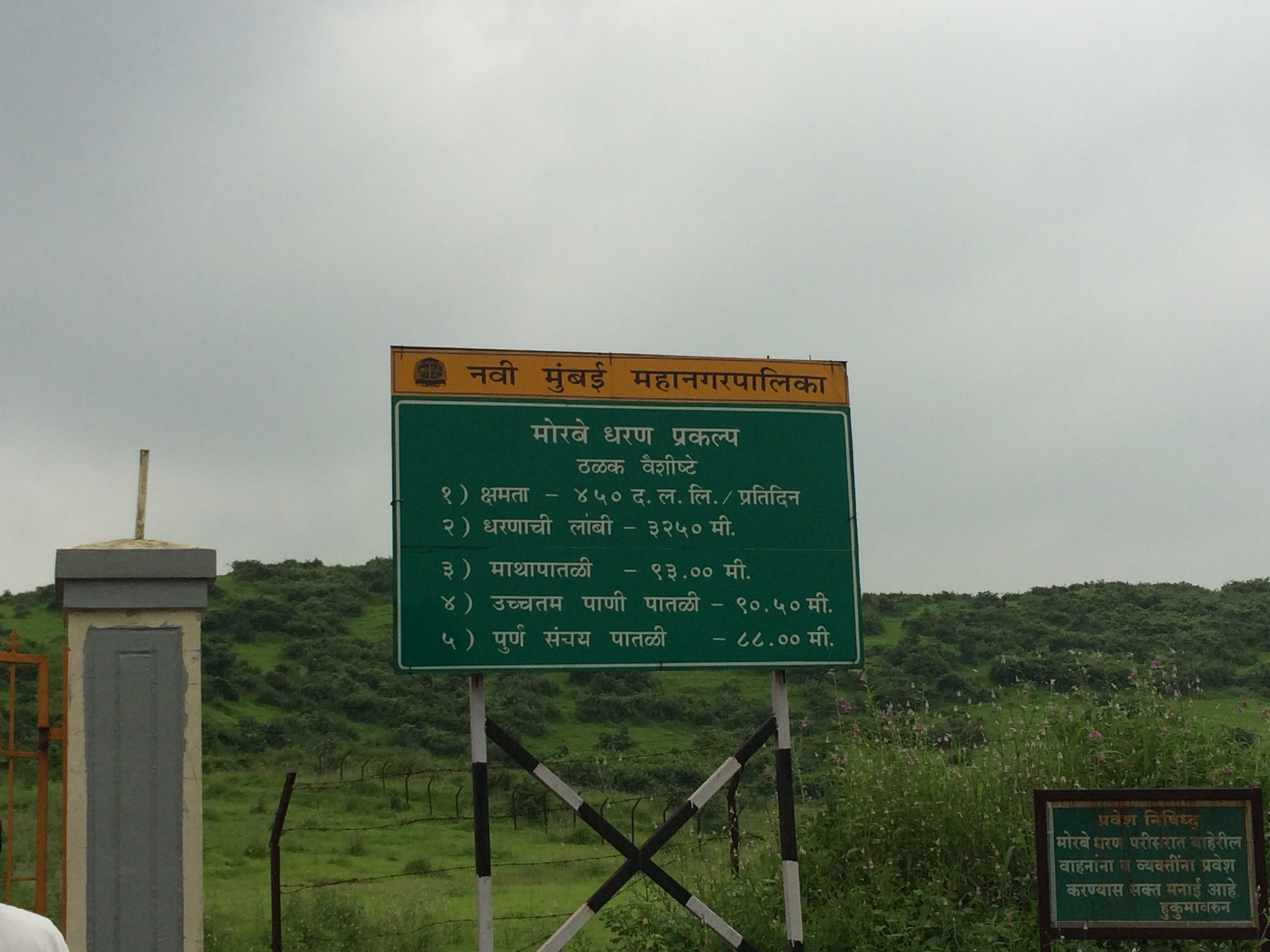
Information board put up at security check post with relevant public-domain data

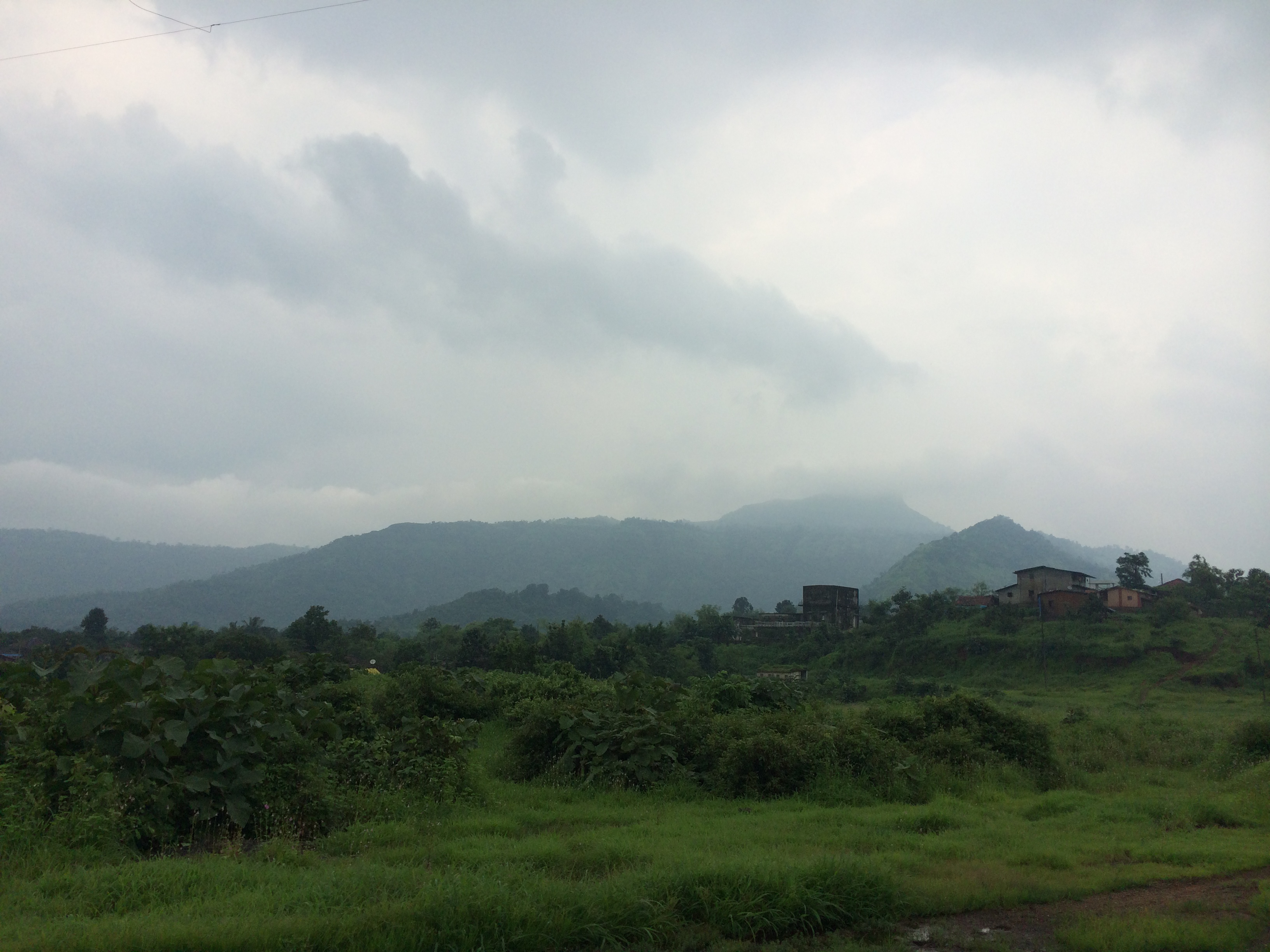
Area Surrounding Morbe Dam

== See also ==
- List of dams and reservoirs in Maharashtra
- List of dams and reservoirs in India
