= Laxman Mahadu Matera =

Indian politician

Laxman Mahadu Matera was an Indian politician and leader of Communist Party of India. He represented Thane constituency in 2nd Lok Sabha.

He participates in the Kisan Movement and works for the emancipation and uplift of Scheduled Tribes in Thane District.
