= Sanjeev Naik =

Indian politician

Sanjeev Ganesh Naik
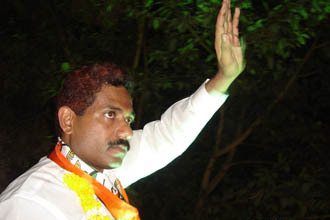
- Sanjeev Naik during 2009 campaign

Member of the India Parliament
- In office 3 June 2009 – 16 May 2014
- Preceded by: Anand Paranjape
- Succeeded by: Rajan Vichare
- Constituency: Thane

Personal details
- Born: 15 April 1972 (age 54) Navi Mumbai, Maharashtra, India
- Party: Bharatiya Janata Party
- Other political affiliations: Nationalist Congress Party
- Parent: Ganesh Naik (father)

Sanjeev Ganesh Naik (born 15 April 1972) is an Indian politician who became the first mayor of the satellite city of Navi Mumbai at the age of 23. He was the Nationalist Congress Party (NCP) Member of the 15th Lok Sabha from Thane (Lok Sabha constituency) in Maharashtra state, elected in the 2009 Indian general election, and is the son of former guardian minister for Thane and NCP member Ganesh Naik.

== Education ==
Naik's educational background has been a matter of some mystery and considerable controversy. According to an affidavit submitted to the Election Commission at the time of the 2014 Lok Sabha Election, he has a 12th pass from the Maharashtra board in Pune, received in 1995.

According to his official website as of 2009, Naik has a Diploma in Dairy Development and Management, and an Advanced Diploma in Computer Hardware and Networks.

During his 2009 campaign, the title "Dr." was used by Naik in his campaign literature. This referred to a degree awarded by a group in the United States called the "International Tamil University", a private distance-learning organisation which is not accredited to award degrees in the US, but which claims affiliation with established universities in India. During the election, Naik's campaign referred to him as the recipient of a doctorate (D Litt), but in his affidavit to the Election Commission of India, he declared that he had only studied up to the Higher Secondary (School) Certificate (HSC), a school qualification which is below university level. Naik himself claimed to have received the degree for "social commitment", and not as an educational qualification. In April 2009, a petition was filed in Bombay High Court to prevent him from using the title "Dr" in his campaign material.

== Political career ==
Naik was first elected mayor of Navi Mumbai in May 1995 at the age of 23, then again in 2000. In 2003, he was elected mayor for the third time.

During his time in office, Naik help lead the establishment of the Navi Mumbai Municipal Transport initiative and initiated the funding of the Morbe dam project. During his third term as mayor, the Navi Mumbai Municipal Corporation was awarded First Prize in the first Sant Gadge Baba Cleanliness Drive, a state-level corporation contest.

Naik contested from the Thane Lok Sabha Constituency in the 2008 by-election, but was defeated by the Shiv Sena party candidate Anand Paranjape by 90,872 votes.

Naik won the MP seat for Thane constituency in the 2009 Lok Sabha Election.
