= Guardian minister =

Ministry in India

A guardian minister is a cabinet-level minister in India appointed by a state government to oversee the development of a specific district within the state. The guardian minister oversees the execution of various state government schemes and programs in the district and ensures that the district's administration is functioning efficiently. The position is typically held by a senior politician from the ruling party who acts as a liaison between the central government and the district administration, ensuring that the district receives the necessary resources and support to meet its development goals. The individual who hold this position is typically an elected Member of the Legislative Assembly (MLA) or Cabinet minister who is designated to bring the personal attention of a minister to the development of that district.

If a district does not have representation in the state cabinet, an outsider can be appointed to serve as the guardian minister for that district. A minister may serve as the guardian minister for multiple districts.

== Roles and responsibilities ==
Guardian minister refers to a designated MLA (member of the legislative assembly) in a state government in India who is assigned responsibility for overseeing the development of a particular district. The role of the guardian minister is to bring personal attention and support to the district, working with the district collector and other officials to address local needs and promote growth.

The guardian minister is also the ex-officio chairperson of the District Planning Committee (DPC), which is responsible for addressing issues of common interest between panchayats (local government bodies) and municipalities, such as infrastructure development, resource sharing and environmental protection. The exact role and responsibilities of the DPC may vary by state, with some states headed by elected representatives and others led by administrative officials.

Guardian ministers are also responsible for coordinating solutions to various issues, including garbage disposal and facilitating land acquisition for large-scale projects such as highways, airports, industrial zones, waste processing plants, and water supply and sewage treatment. They are also tasked with monitoring the joint budget of all local civic bodies within the district.

They are expected to ensure the passing of a common draft budget and review its implementation quarterly. The Guardian Minister also plays a crucial role in ensuring the effective implementation of funds sanctioned by the central and state governments for various Schemes.

The Guardian minister is seen as a way for a political leader or party to increase their control over a district, as the minister is positioned close to the citizens and is able to interact with them directly.

== Guardian secretary ==
Guardian Secretary is a senior bureaucrat appointed by the state government, following the appointment of the guardian minister. Their role involves holding Lok Adalats, which are forums for addressing the grievances of citizens. The Guardian secretary is also responsible for coordinating with various government departments to resolve issues and ensure the implementation of development projects.

== Assam ==
The Government of Assam introduced the concept of guardian ministers in 2021. The aim is to bring attention to the implementation of government policies, reforms, and public welfare schemes in assigned districts. The guardian minister reviews implementation, makes quick decisions on public applications, visits the district regularly and inspects circle offices. They also submit a report on scheme implementation to the Chief Minister of Assam. The initiative seeks to improve government service delivery and address public needs.

Guardian Ministers of Assam

== Maharashtra ==
This concept of guardian minister has been followed by successive governments in Maharashtra since 2004. It has been utilized as a political strategy to broaden the base of a political party. For example, between 2004 and 2014, senior NCP leader Ajit Pawar, who represented the Baramati assembly and served as the guardian minister for Pune. This helped the Nationalist Congress Party to expand its presence in the district and consolidate its control over the Pune Municipal Corporation while keeping the Congress at bay.

In Maharashtra state, the Devendra Fadnavis government has 20 guardian ministers, including the Chief Minister and the Deputy Chief Minister. The maximum number of ministers that the government can appoint is 43.

In Pune, the responsibilities of the Guardian minister extend beyond the typical duties. The minister is also required to lead the committee responsible for ensuring all necessary facilities during the annual pilgrimage from Alandi and Dehu to Pandharpur. The Guardian Minister also closely monitors the preparations during the Ganesh Festival.

== See also ==
- Minister (government)
- Chief minister
- Governor
- Parliamentary leader
