= Manda Vijay Mhatre =

Indian politician

Member of the Maharashtra Legislative Assembly
- Incumbent
- Assumed office 2014
- Preceded by: Ganesh Naik
- Constituency: Belapur

Member of the Maharashtra Legislative Council
- In office 8 July 2004 – 7 July 2010
- Constituency: elected by Members of Legislative Assembly

Manda Vijay Mhatre is a member of the 13th Maharashtra Legislative Assembly. She represents the Belapur Assembly Constituency. She belongs to the Bharatiya Janata Party.
