= Belapur Assembly constituency =

Constituency of the Maharashtra legislative assembly in India

Coordinates: 19.57°N 74.65°E

Belapur
- Constituency No. 151 for the Maharashtra Legislative Assembly

Constituency details
- Country: India
- Region: Western India
- State: Maharashtra
- District: Thane
- Lok Sabha constituency: Thane
- Established: 1978
- Total electors: 423,703
- Reservation: None

Member of Legislative Assembly
- 15th Maharashtra Legislative Assembly
- Incumbent Manda Vijay Mhatre
- Party: Bharatiya Janata Party
- Elected year: 2024

Belapur Assembly constituency is one of the 288 Vidhan Sabha (Assembly) constituencies of Maharashtra state in Western India.

== Members of the Legislative Assembly ==
Year	Member	Party
1978	Gautam Bhoir	Janata Party
1980	Balaji Bhagat	Indian National Congress (I)
1985	Janardan Gauri	Indian National Congress
1990	Ganesh Naik	Shiv Sena
1995	Ganesh Naik	Shiv Sena
1999	Sitaram Bhoir	Shiv Sena
2004	Ganesh Naik	Nationalist Congress Party
2009	Ganesh Naik	Nationalist Congress Party
2014	Manda Mhatre	Bharatiya Janata Party
2019	Manda Mhatre	Bharatiya Janata Party
2024	Manda Mhatre	Bharatiya Janata Party

== Election results ==
=== Assembly Election 2024 ===
2024 Maharashtra Legislative Assembly election : Belapur
Party	Candidate	Votes	%	±%
BJP	Manda Vijay Mhatre	91,852	39.47%	▼11.99
NCP-SP	Sandeep Naik	91,475	39.31%	New
Independent	Vijay Nahata	19,646	8.44%	New
MNS	Gajanan Shrikrishna Kale	17,704	7.61%	▼8.57
Maharashtra Rajya Samiti	Prafulla Narayan Mhatre	2,860	1.23%	New
VBA	Sunil Prabhu Bhole	2,833	1.22%	New
NOTA	None of the Above	2,588	1.11%	▼1.12
Independent	Dr. Amale Mangesh Mahadeo	2,333	1.00%	New
Margin of victory		377	0.16%	▼25.37
Turnout		2,35,279	55.53%	▲10.69
Total valid votes		2,32,691		
Registered electors		4,23,703		▲9.77
BJP hold		Swing	▼11.99	

=== Assembly Election 2019 ===
2019 Maharashtra Legislative Assembly election : Belapur
Party	Candidate	Votes	%	±%
BJP	Manda Vijay Mhatre	87,858	51.46%	▲22.08
NCP	Ashok Ankush Gawade	44,261	25.93%	▼2.66
MNS	Gajanan Shrikrishna Kale	27,618	16.18%	▲13.95
NOTA	None of the Above	3,804	2.23%	▲1.20
Independent	Gautam Duryodhan Gaikwad	3,031	1.78%	New
Independent	Chandrashekhar Janardan Ranade	2,648	1.55%	New
BSP	Avhad Sachin Bharat	1,556	0.91%	▼0.18
Margin of victory		43,597	25.54%	▲24.74
Turnout		1,74,589	45.23%	▼5.03
Total valid votes		1,70,723		
Registered electors		3,85,993		▲1.00
BJP hold		Swing	▲22.08	

=== Assembly Election 2014 ===
2014 Maharashtra Legislative Assembly election : Belapur
Party	Candidate	Votes	%	±%
BJP	Manda Vijay Mhatre	55,316	29.38%	▼2.61
NCP	Ganesh Naik	53,825	28.59%	▼12.19
SS	Vijay Nahata	50,983	27.08%	New
INC	Namdeo Rama Bhagat	16,604	8.82%	New
MNS	Gajanan Shrikrishna Kale	4,193	2.23%	▼11.14
Independent	Patil Rajesh Janardan	3,722	1.98%	New
BSP	Deepak Kaka Sawant	2,053	1.09%	▲0.07
NOTA	None of the Above	1,944	1.03%	New
Margin of victory		1,491	0.79%	▼8.00
Turnout		1,90,271	49.79%	▲2.55
Total valid votes		1,88,262		
Registered electors		3,82,185		▲21.98
BJP gain from NCP		Swing	▼11.40	

=== Assembly Election 2009 ===
2009 Maharashtra Legislative Assembly election : Belapur
Party	Candidate	Votes	%	±%
NCP	Ganesh Naik	59,685	40.78%	▼14.30
BJP	Haware Suresh Kashinath	46,812	31.99%	New
MNS	Rajendra (Papu) Mahale	19,569	13.37%	New
Independent	Namdeo Rama Bhagat	14,516	9.92%	New
BSP	Pradeep Gajanan Dhobale	1,491	1.02%	▼0.33
Independent	Ramesh J.Shinde	1,133	0.77%	New
Independent	Mahesh Khare	1,089	0.74%	New
Margin of victory		12,873	8.80%	▼11.27
Turnout		1,46,353	46.71%	▲0.71
Total valid votes		1,46,342		
Registered electors		3,13,327		▼75.55
NCP hold		Swing	▼14.30	

=== Assembly Election 2004 ===
2004 Maharashtra Legislative Assembly election : Belapur
Party	Candidate	Votes	%	±%
NCP	Ganesh Naik	324,706	55.08%	▲22.04
SS	Bhoir Sitaram Hendar	2,06,430	35.02%	▲0.81
Independent	Haribansh Singh	35,182	5.97%	New
BSP	Ravindra Prabhakar Gharat	7,942	1.35%	▲0.82
SP	Ajit Shrinath Singh	4,299	0.73%	New
Margin of victory		1,18,276	20.06%	▲18.90
Turnout		5,90,593	46.08%	▲19.16
Total valid votes		5,89,491		
Registered electors		12,81,680		▲43.88
NCP gain from SS		Swing	▲20.88	

=== Assembly Election 1999 ===
1999 Maharashtra Legislative Assembly election : Belapur
Party	Candidate	Votes	%	±%
SS	Sitaram Bhoir	81,764	34.21%	▼22.28
NCP	Ganesh Naik	78,978	33.04%	New
INC	Gauri Janardan Shantaram	74,833	31.31%	▲3.05
Margin of victory		2,786	1.17%	▼27.07
Turnout		2,44,895	27.49%	▼14.05
Total valid votes		2,39,027		
Registered electors		8,90,784		▼5.67
SS hold		Swing	▼22.28	

=== Assembly Election 1995 ===
1995 Maharashtra Legislative Assembly election : Belapur
Party	Candidate	Votes	%	±%
SS	Ganesh Naik	218,100	56.49%	▲7.49
INC	Muzaffar Hussain	1,09,099	28.26%	▼9.00
JD	Sayyad Ali Ashraf	21,982	5.69%	▼3.23
Independent	Foujdar Rangi Goud	9,574	2.48%	New
BSP	Dr. A. R. Siddiqui	5,112	1.32%	▲1.01
JP	Lalit Parmar	3,305	0.86%	New
Independent	Adv. Babanrao Bansode	2,567	0.66%	New
Margin of victory		1,09,001	28.23%	▲16.48
Turnout		3,93,283	41.65%	▼9.91
Total valid votes		3,86,103		
Registered electors		9,44,365		▲104.48
SS hold		Swing	▲7.49	

=== Assembly Election 1990 ===
1990 Maharashtra Legislative Assembly election : Belapur
Party	Candidate	Votes	%	±%
SS	Ganesh Naik	114,947	49.00%	New
INC	Manohar Rama Salvi	87,386	37.25%	▼1.70
JD	Dasharath K. Patil	20,934	8.92%	New
Independent	Jain Mithallal	8,875	3.78%	New
Margin of victory		27,561	11.75%	▲9.80
Turnout		2,38,254	51.59%	▲4.19
Total valid votes		2,34,578		
Registered electors		4,61,843		▲86.80
SS gain from INC		Swing	▲10.05	

=== Assembly Election 1985 ===
1985 Maharashtra Legislative Assembly election : Belapur
Party	Candidate	Votes	%	±%
INC	Gouri Janaradhan Shanta Ram	44,882	38.95%	New
Independent	Ganesh Naik	42,641	37.01%	New
BJP	Bhagat Gowardhan Chango	14,879	12.91%	▼6.35
Independent	Hari Mali	6,880	5.97%	New
RPI(K)	Indise Gangaram Dodha	2,488	2.16%	New
Independent	Owale Baburao Shrirang	1,217	1.06%	New
Independent	Randive Parshuram Namdeo	840	0.73%	New
Margin of victory		2,241	1.94%	▼37.44
Turnout		1,17,643	47.58%	▲18.49
Total valid votes		1,15,221		
Registered electors		2,47,235		▲42.08
INC gain from INC(I)		Swing	▼19.69	

=== Assembly Election 1980 ===
1980 Maharashtra Legislative Assembly election : Belapur
Party	Candidate	Votes	%	±%
INC(I)	Bhagat Balaji Kathod	28,688	58.65%	▲38.73
BJP	Bhagat Gowardhan Chango	9,424	19.27%	New
JP	Bhoir Gautam Posha	5,944	12.15%	▼27.12
Independent	Bhagat Nana Suka	2,044	4.18%	New
INC(U)	Parekh B. C.	1,481	3.03%	New
Independent	Pagre Dashrath Waman	1,131	2.31%	New
Margin of victory		19,264	39.38%	▲20.03
Turnout		49,951	28.71%	▼31.89
Total valid votes		48,917		
Registered electors		1,74,014		▲46.33
INC(I) gain from JP		Swing	▲19.38	

=== Assembly Election 1978 ===
1978 Maharashtra Legislative Assembly election : Belapur
Party	Candidate	Votes	%	±%
JP	Bhoir Gautam Posha	28,018	39.27%	New
INC(I)	Bhagat Balaji Kathod	14,214	19.92%	New
SS	Ganesh Naik	12,797	17.94%	New
INC	Patil Moreshwar Narayan	12,658	17.74%	New
Independent	Nana Suka Bhagat	2,258	3.16%	New
Independent	Pathare Dashrath Waman	1,406	1.97%	New
Margin of victory		13,804	19.35%	
Turnout		73,322	61.66%	
Total valid votes		71,351		
Registered electors		1,18,920		
JP win (new seat)				
