= Thane Assembly constituency =

Constituency of the Maharashtra legislative assembly in India

Coordinates: 19°11′50″N 72°58′20″E

Thane
- Constituency No. 148 for the Maharashtra Legislative Assembly

Constituency details
- Country: India
- Region: Western India
- State: Maharashtra
- District: Thane
- Lok Sabha constituency: Thane
- Established: 1952
- Total electors: 378,342
- Reservation: None

Member of Legislative Assembly
- 15th Maharashtra Legislative Assembly
- Incumbent Sanjay Mukund Kelkar
- Party: Bharatiya Janata Party
- Elected year: 2024

Thane Assembly constituency is one of the 288 Vidhan Sabha (Assembly) constituencies of Maharashtra, India. It is one of the six assembly seats which make up Thane Lok Sabha constituency. Thane is near Mumbai.

== Members of the Legislative Assembly ==
Election	Member	Party
1952	Hegde Madhavrao Vinayak	Indian National Congress
1957	Tamhane Dattatraya Balkrishna	Praja Socialist Party
1962	Champa Govardhan Mokal	Indian National Congress
1967	D. K. Rajarshi	Indian National Congress
1972	Vimal Kaanderao Rangnekar	Indian National Congress
1978	Gajanan Motiram Koli	Janata Party
1980	Kanti Kisan Koli	Indian National Congress (I)
1985	Kanti Kisan Koli	Indian National Congress
1990	Moreshwar Damodar Joshi	Shiv Sena
1995	Moreshwar Damodar Joshi	Shiv Sena
1999	Moreshwar Damodar Joshi	Shiv Sena
2004	Eknath Shinde	Shiv Sena
2009	Rajan Vichare	Shiv Sena
2014	Sanjay Mukund Kelkar	Bharatiya Janata Party
2019	Sanjay Mukund Kelkar	Bharatiya Janata Party
2024	Sanjay Mukund Kelkar	Bharatiya Janata Party

== Election results ==
=== Assembly Election 2024 ===
2024 Maharashtra Legislative Assembly election : Thane
Party	Candidate	Votes	%	±%
BJP	Sanjay Mukund Kelkar	120,373	52.46%	▼0.98
SS(UBT)	Rajan Baburao Vichare	62,120	27.07%	New
MNS	Avinash Anant Jadhav	42,592	18.56%	▼23.63
NOTA	None of the above	2,694	1.17%	▼2.04
Independent	Amar Ashok Athawale	1,495	0.65%	New
Margin of victory		58,253	25.39%	▲14.14
Turnout		232,162	61.36%	▲8.59
Total valid votes		229,468		
Registered electors		378,342		▲11.99
BJP hold		Swing	▼0.98	

=== Assembly Election 2019 ===
2019 Maharashtra Legislative Assembly election : Thane
Party	Candidate	Votes	%	±%
BJP	Sanjay Mukund Kelkar	92,298	53.44%	▲14.10
MNS	Avinash Anant Jadhav	72,874	42.19%	▲37.54
NOTA	None of the above	5,547	3.21%	▲1.99
Independent	Eknath Ananda Jadhav (Bhau)	3,996	2.31%	New
BSP	Kedarnath Ruparam Bharti	2,333	1.35%	▲0.61
Bahujan Maha Party	Godbole Yogesh Vishwanath (Samir)	1,210	0.70%	New
Margin of victory		19,424	11.25%	▲4.26
Turnout		178,289	52.77%	▼3.81
Total valid votes		172,711		
Registered electors		337,846		▲4.79
BJP hold		Swing	▲14.10	

=== Assembly Election 2014 ===
2014 Maharashtra Legislative Assembly election : Thane
Party	Candidate	Votes	%	±%
BJP	Sanjay Mukund Kelkar	70,884	39.34%	New
SS	Ravindra Sadanand Phatak	58,296	32.35%	▲0.13
NCP	Adv. Davkhare Niranjan Vasant	24,320	13.50%	New
INC	Pawar Narayan Shankar	15,883	8.81%	▼14.11
MNS	Nilesh Harishchandra Chavan	8,381	4.65%	▼26.03
NOTA	None of the above	2,194	1.22%	New
BSP	Adv. Pradnesh Chaitanya Sonawane	1,329	0.74%	▲0.10
Margin of victory		12,588	6.99%	▲5.45
Turnout		182,416	56.58%	▲5.05
Total valid votes		180,195		
Registered electors		322,390		▲4.93
BJP gain from SS		Swing	▲7.12	

=== Assembly Election 2009 ===
2009 Maharashtra Legislative Assembly election : Thane
Party	Candidate	Votes	%	±%
SS	Rajan Vichare	51,010	32.22%	▼23.92
MNS	Rajan Raje	48,569	30.68%	New
INC	Kanade Subhash Pandurang	36,288	22.92%	▼17.30
Independent	Devram Bhoir	17,244	10.89%	New
RKSP	Shekh Tabrej Abdulsamad	2,071	1.31%	New
BSP	Shinde Tusahr Marotrao	1,019	0.64%	▼0.58
Margin of victory		2,441	1.54%	▼14.37
Turnout		158,333	51.53%	▼1.20
Total valid votes		158,323		
Registered electors		307,240		▼30.67
SS hold		Swing	▼23.92	

=== Assembly Election 2004 ===
2004 Maharashtra Legislative Assembly election : Thane
Party	Candidate	Votes	%	±%
SS	Eknath Shinde	131,159	56.14%	▲10.46
INC	Manoj Tukaram Shinde	93,981	40.22%	▲1.64
BSP	Muzumdar Nilesh Shantaram	2,851	1.22%	▲0.73
Independent	Mohammed Yosuf Ahmed Sayyad	1,708	0.73%	New
Margin of victory		37,178	15.91%	▲8.81
Turnout		233,653	52.73%	▲12.96
Total valid votes		233,645		
Registered electors		443,140		▲17.12
SS hold		Swing	▲10.46	

=== Assembly Election 1999 ===
1999 Maharashtra Legislative Assembly election : Thane
Party	Candidate	Votes	%	±%
SS	Moreshwar Damodar Joshi	67,429	45.68%	▼12.33
INC	Subhash Kanade	56,950	38.58%	▲10.90
NCP	Ashok Rajaram Raul	21,901	14.84%	New
Margin of victory		10,479	7.10%	▼23.23
Turnout		150,487	39.77%	▼12.91
Total valid votes		147,615		
Registered electors		378,372		▼6.95
SS hold		Swing	▼12.33	

=== Assembly Election 1995 ===
1995 Maharashtra Legislative Assembly election : Thane
Party	Candidate	Votes	%	±%
SS	Moreshwar Damodar Joshi	122,595	58.01%	▼0.49
INC	Bhoir Malati Ramesh	58,492	27.68%	▼5.37
Independent	Bedekar Vijay Vasudeo	7,164	3.39%	New
JD	Singh Ramashray Ramkaran	4,844	2.29%	▼5.19
Independent	Chavhan Harishchandra Laxaman	4,382	2.07%	New
BSP	Tipu Sultan	3,718	1.76%	New
Independent	Vaiti Janardan Yeshawant	2,752	1.30%	New
SP	Sharma Ramdhavan Chandru	2,302	1.09%	New
Margin of victory		64,103	30.33%	▲4.88
Turnout		214,236	52.68%	▼1.86
Total valid votes		211,349		
Registered electors		406,651		▲36.28
SS hold		Swing	▼0.49	

=== Assembly Election 1990 ===
1990 Maharashtra Legislative Assembly election : Thane
Party	Candidate	Votes	%	±%
SS	Moreshwar Damodar Joshi	94,236	58.50%	New
INC	Kanti Kisan Koli	53,237	33.05%	▼6.46
JD	Suryakant Vadhavkar	12,052	7.48%	New
Margin of victory		40,999	25.45%	▲14.71
Turnout		162,752	54.54%	▲3.94
Total valid votes		161,086		
Registered electors		298,386		▲44.16
SS gain from INC		Swing	▲18.99	

=== Assembly Election 1985 ===
1985 Maharashtra Legislative Assembly election : Thane
Party	Candidate	Votes	%	±%
INC	Kanti Kisan Koli	40,890	39.51%	New
Independent	Satish Pradhan	29,772	28.77%	New
BJP	Gharpure. P. V	23,120	22.34%	▼8.26
Independent	Ashok Pradhan	3,180	3.07%	New
Independent	Nathuram Adsule	2,179	2.11%	New
CPI	Ravaba Chikane	1,430	1.38%	New
Independent	P. M. Rana	1,277	1.23%	New
Margin of victory		11,118	10.74%	▼6.26
Turnout		104,737	50.60%	▲11.57
Total valid votes		103,496		
Registered electors		206,981		▲18.02
INC gain from INC(I)		Swing	▼8.09	

=== Assembly Election 1980 ===
1980 Maharashtra Legislative Assembly election : Thane
Party	Candidate	Votes	%	±%
INC(I)	Kanti Kisan Koli	32,186	47.60%	▲32.89
BJP	Gajanan Motiram Koli	20,690	30.60%	New
JP	Vadhawakar. S. M	8,967	13.26%	New
INC(U)	Chavan Harishchandra Laxaman	3,009	4.45%	New
[[Janata Party (Secular) Charan Singh|Janata Party (Secular) Charan Singh]]	Yadav Giradhari Badari	1,394	2.06%	New
Independent	Pagare Parbhakar. N	938	1.39%	New
Margin of victory		11,496	17.00%	▼15.19
Turnout		68,443	39.03%	▼28.94
Total valid votes		67,618		
Registered electors		175,380		▲30.87
INC(I) gain from JP		Swing	▼7.12	

=== Assembly Election 1978 ===
1978 Maharashtra Legislative Assembly election : Thane
Party	Candidate	Votes	%	±%
JP	Gajanan Motiram Koli	49,123	54.72%	New
SS	Satish Pradhan	20,231	22.54%	▲12.66
INC(I)	Amarsingh Bachansingh Thakur	13,203	14.71%	New
INC	Raganekar Vimal Khanderao	5,195	5.79%	▼53.75
Independent	Bhadkamar Pandharinath Krishna	1,381	1.54%	New
Margin of victory		28,892	32.19%	▼8.99
Turnout		91,088	67.97%	▲13.00
Total valid votes		89,767		
Registered electors		134,014		▼10.14
JP gain from INC		Swing	▼4.82	

=== Assembly Election 1972 ===
1972 Maharashtra Legislative Assembly election : Thane
Party	Candidate	Votes	%	±%
INC	Vimal Kaanderao Rangnekar	47,730	59.54%	▲22.35
ABJS	Wamanrao Rege Prabhakar	14,718	18.36%	▼2.17
SS	Moreshwar Damodhar Joshi	7,917	9.88%	New
SSP	Suryakant Vadhaykar	6,912	8.62%	New
RPI(K)	Howale Baburao Shrirang	2,219	2.77%	New
INC(O)	Pratik M. Tillu	670	0.84%	New
Margin of victory		33,012	41.18%	▲29.23
Turnout		81,982	54.97%	▼12.42
Total valid votes		80,166		
Registered electors		149,142		▲66.33
INC hold		Swing	▲22.35	

=== Assembly Election 1967 ===
1967 Maharashtra Legislative Assembly election : Thane
Party	Candidate	Votes	%	±%
INC	D. K. Rajarshi	21,093	37.19%	▼4.43
PSP	D. B. Tamhane	14,317	25.24%	▲6.07
ABJS	Gajanan Motiram Koli	11,646	20.53%	New
CPI(M)	B. K. Khopar	7,631	13.45%	New
Independent	K. K. Gaikwad	1,745	3.08%	New
Margin of victory		6,776	11.95%	▼6.55
Turnout		60,429	67.39%	▲4.53
Total valid votes		56,722		
Registered electors		89,665		▲9.45
INC hold		Swing	▼4.43	

=== Assembly Election 1962 ===
1962 Maharashtra Legislative Assembly election : Thane
Party	Candidate	Votes	%	±%
INC	Champa Govardhan Mokal	20,583	41.62%	▲19.26
CPI	B. K. Khopar	11,432	23.12%	New
PSP	Dattatray Balkrishna Tamhane	9,479	19.17%	▼42.48
ABJS	Mukund Sundar Agaskar	7,961	16.10%	New
Margin of victory		9,151	18.50%	▼20.80
Turnout		51,495	62.86%	▲2.48
Total valid votes		49,455		
Registered electors		81,924		▲49.27
INC gain from PSP		Swing	▼20.03	

=== Assembly Election 1957 ===
1957 Bombay State Legislative Assembly election : Thane
Party	Candidate	Votes	%	±%
PSP	Tamhane Dattatraya Balkrishna	20,432	61.65%	New
INC	Hegde Madhavrao Vinayak	7,409	22.36%	▼23.12
Independent	Patil Gopal Kalu	5,300	15.99%	New
Margin of victory		13,023	39.30%	▲13.03
Turnout		33,141	60.38%	▲11.93
Total valid votes		33,141		
Registered electors		54,884		▼14.02
PSP gain from INC		Swing	▲16.17	

=== Assembly Election 1952 ===
1952 Bombay State Legislative Assembly election : Thane
Party	Candidate	Votes	%	±%
INC	Hegde Madhavrao Vinayak	14,067	45.48%	New
Socialist	Tamhane Dattatraya Balkrishna	5,943	19.21%	New
Kamgar Kisan Paksha	Raut Shivram Nagesh	5,678	18.36%	New
Independent	Shah Ratilal Ujamshi	2,634	8.52%	New
Independent	Bhatia Nandiram Jamnadas	1,072	3.47%	New
Independent	Koli Mahadeo Atmaram	751	2.43%	New
Independent	Lombar Pandharinath Mahadeo	474	1.53%	New
RRP	Nandganonkar Mahadeo Maloji	311	1.01%	New
Margin of victory		8,124	26.27%	
Turnout		30,930	48.45%	
Total valid votes		30,930		
Registered electors		63,834		
INC win (new seat)				

== See also ==
- Thane (Lok Sabha constituency)
