= Thane Municipal Corporation =

Governing body of the city of Thane, Maharashtra, India

Type
- Type: Municipal Corporation of the Thane
- Established: 1982; 44 years ago

Leadership
- Mayor: Sharmila Pimplolkar, Shiv Sena (SHS)
- Deputy Mayor: Krishna Dadu Patil, Bharatiya Janata Party
- Municipal Commissioner & Administrator: Saurabh Rao, IAS

Structure
- Seats: 131
- Political groups: Government (104): SHS (75); BJP (28); IND (1); Opposition (27): NCP-SP (12); NCP (9); AIMIM (5); SS(UBT) (1)

Elections
- Last election: 15 January 2026
- Next election: 2031

Website
- http://www.thanecity.gov.in

The Thane Municipal Corporation (TMC) is the governing body of the city of Thane in the Indian state of Maharashtra. The municipal corporation consisting of democratically elected members, is headed by a mayor and administers the city's infrastructure, public services and transport. Members from the nation's and state's leading political parties such as the Nationalist Congress Party, Indian National Congress, Shiv Sena, Bhartiya Janata Party and the Maharashtra Navnirman Sena hold elected offices in the corporation.

The TMC has jurisdiction over the towns of Kalwa, Diva and Mumbra-Kausa, along with the main city of Thane. Thane Municipal Corporation has been formed with functions to improve the infrastructure of town.

== Wards ==
Thane Municipal Corporation is divided into 47 wards, of which 46 wards elect 3 members while 1 ward elects 4 members, making the number of seats 131. However, since 2022, it has been under administrative rule after the term of the last elected body ended. As per news reports, in November 2025 the Thane Municipal Corporation finalised ward-wise reservation for 131 seats across 33 wards.

Zone	Ward Number	Ward Name	Areas Covered	Assembly Constituency	Councillor	Political Group
	1	Ovala, Bhainderpada, Vadavali, Kavesar	Gaimukh, Nagla Bunder, Ovala, Bhayender Pada, Lodha Splendora, Kasarvadavali gaon, Vijay Park, Everest country side, Sukur Enclave, Sukur Residency, Tropical lagoons, Swastik Residency, Hill spring, Cosmos Park, Vijay Gardens, Vijay Vilas, Vijay Orion, Unnati Woods, Kanchanpushpa, Kavesar, Waghbil, Vijay Nagari, Vijay Enclave, Vijay Annex, Vasant Leela, Rodas Enclave			
	2	Hiranandani Estate, Patlipada, Kingkong Nagar.	Dongari pada, Patli pada, Kingkong Nagar, Vasant Leela (Part), Rutu Estate, Hiranandani Estate, Brajbhoomi, Brahmand Phase 8, Swastik Park A, B			
	3	Brahmand, Kolshet, Azad Nagar,	One Hiranandani Park, Anamitra Society, Brahmand, Swastik Park C, Regency Tower, Azadnagar, Durga Nagar, Kolshet Varcha gaon, Akbar Camp			
	4	Manpada, Manorama Nagar, Majivada village	St. Xavier's High School, Manpada, Part of Manoramanagar, Siddheshwar Vishwanath Mandir, Shruti Garden, Aban Park, Runwal Pearl, Pride Park, Rewale Lake, Majivada Village,			
	5	Kokani Pada, Nilkanth Greens, Borivade.	Gaimukh, Puranik Rumah Bali, Vihang Hills, Cosmos Hawayan, Harmony Horizon, Pushpanjali Residency, Rosa Gardenia, Haware city, Park woods, Happy Valley, Kalpataru Hills, Shubharambh, Garden Estate			
	6	Yeoor, Shivai Nagar	Yeoor Village - Patlipada, Upvan Talao Area , Golibar Maidan Area, Voltas Company, Surendra Industries, Pokhran Road No. 2 Konkani Pada, Shivai Nagar area, Devdaya Nagar, Misalwadi Area, Glaxo Company, Blue Star Company and Some part of Voltas Company			
	7	Vasant Vihar, Sudhdhachal, Pawar Nagar, MHADA	Gandhi Nagar Area, Asher Residency, Jawahar Nagar, Glendale Society, Vasant Vihar Society & Mhada Colony, Pawar Nagar, Sindhchanchal, Surendra Industries Area, Nilgiri Society, Ma Niketan area, Tata Serene, Wadhwa			
	8	Hiranandani Medows, Dharmaveer Nagar, Subhash Nagar	Subhash Nagar area, Nilkanth Palms, Nal pada, Lok Upavan, Tulshidham, BSUP Buildings, Hiranandani Meadows, Lokpuram, Godrej Society, Acme Ozone, Dosti Imperia, Varun Garden, Hyde Park, Kashinath Ghanekar Natyagruh Area			
	9	Balkum, Ram Maruti Nagar, Runwal Garden City	Dadlani Park, Ashok Nagar, Balkum Pada no. 1, 2, 3, Highland Haven, Lodha Complex (some parts), Rustomjee Urbania (part) Dhokali Village, Siddheshwar Garden, Pride Palm.			
	10	Vartak Nagar, Laxmi- Chirag Nagar, Oswal Park.	Maitri Garden, Oswal Park, Hardas Nagar, Vasant Lawns, Avalon, Viviana Mall Area, Raymond Company Area, Valmik Nagar, Vartak Nagar Mhada Colony, Bhimnagar, Mahakalinagar, Sainath Nagar,			
	11	Reptakos Company, Vedant Complex, Samata Nagar, Kores Nakshtra	Reptocos Company Vedanta Complex, Samata Nagar, Kores, Nakshatra, Dosti Vihar			
	12	Shashri Nagar, Pareira Nagar, Rifle range	Shashri Nagar, Pareira Nagar, Rifle range			
	13	Indira Nagar, Hanuman Nagar, Lokmanya Nagar Pada No. 4	Lokmanya Nagar Pada No. 4, Part of Panchpakhadi MHADA Colony			
	14	Savarkar Nagar, Davle Nagar, Karwalo Nagar	Savarkar Nagar, R. J. Thakur College area, ESIS Hospital Area.			
	15	Ambika Nagar, Dnyaneshwar Nagar	Ambika Nagar, Dnyaneshwar Nagar, Wimbledon Park, Hanuman Nagar			
	16	Louis Wadi, Ramchandra Nagar, Koram Mall	Louis Wadi, Ramchandra Nagar, Koram Mall			
	17	VRINDAVAN (Part), SHRIRANG SOCIETY, Gokul Nagar	Vrindavan, Shrirang Society, Azadnagar, Ambeghosale lake, Sumer castle, Vikas complex, Runwal nagar A, Kolbad Road, Gokul nagar, Golden Park, Rutu Park			
	18	SAKET, RUSTOMJEE, RABODI, KRANTI NAGAR, AKASHGANGA, PANCHGANGA, K VILLA	RUSTOMJEE ( South of Bhivandi Bypass Road), SAKET, RABODI KRANTI NAGAR, K VILLA (Part), Holly Cross School Area, Rabodi, Vrindavan (Part) AKASHGANGA, PANCHGANGA			
	19	CHARAI, POLICE COLONY, K VILLA	CHARAI, POLICE COLONY, K VILLA			
	20	SIDDHESHWA R TALAO, KOLBAD	SIDDHESHWAR TALAO, RAMABAI AMBEDKAR NAGAR, RUNWAL NAGAR B, KOLBAD, BRAHMALA TALAO, GOKULDAS WADI, SINGH NAGAR, SHELAR PADA, GANESH WADI			
	21	Panchpakhadi, Naupada, Bhaskar Colony, Tekdi Bunglow, Namdevwadi	Panchpakhadi, Naupada, Bhaskar Colony, Tekdi Bunglow, Namdevwadi			
	22	Ramkrishna Nagar, Hajuri, Railadevi Lake, Maharashtra Nagar	Ramkrishna Nagar, Hajuri, Railadevi Lake, Maharashtra Nagar			
	23	CP Talao, Nehru Nagar, Part Indira Nagar	CP Talao, Nehru Nagar, Part Indira Nagar			
	24	Shri Nagar, Shanti Nagar, Ram Nagar	Shri Nagar, Shanti Nagar, Ram Nagar			
	25	Kisan Nagar No. 2	Kisan Nagar No. 2			
	26	Kisan Nagar No. 1, Padwal Nagar, Ratanbai Compound	Kisan Nagar No. 1, Padwal Nagar, Ratanbai Compound			
	27	Anand Nagar, Kashish Park, Raheja Garden, Raghunath Nagar	Anand Nagar, Kashish Park, Raheja Garden, Raghunath Nagar			
	28	Naupada, Ram Maruti Road, Gokhale Road, Brahman Society, Ghantali, Vishnu Nagar	Naupada, Ram Maruti Road, Gokhale Road, Brahman Society, Ghantali, Vishnu Nagar			
	29	Chendani, (East & West), Kharten Road, Kharkal Ali, Mahagiri	Chendani, (East & West), Kharten Road, Kharkal Ali, Mahagiri			
	30	Kopari, Kopari Colony, Siddharth Nagar, Daulat Nagar, Sindhi Colony	Kopari, Kopari Colony, Siddharth Nagar, Daulat Nagar, Sindhi Colony			
	31	Vitawa, Surya nagar	Vitawa, Surya nagar			
	32	Mafatlal Co, Shivaji Nagar	Mafatlal Co, Shivaji Nagar			
	33	Kalwa Car Shed, Kalwa Gaon,	Kalwa Car Shed, Kalwa Gaon, CSM Hospital, TMT.			
	34	Manisha Nagar, Janaki Nagar, Mahatma Phule Nagar	Manisha Nagar, Janaki Nagar, Mahatma Phule Nagar			
	35	Parsik Nagar, Khari-Pakhadi, Sanghavi Valley	Parsik Nagar, Khari-Pakhadi, Sanghavi Valley			
	36	Gholai Nagar, Atkoneshwar Nagar, Puand Pada, Waghoba Nagar	Gholai Nagar, Atkoneshwar Nagar, Puand Pada, Waghoba Nagar			
	37	Parsik Retibandar, Rana Nagar, Datt Wadi, Part Of Shailesh Nagar	Parsik Retibandar, Rana Nagar, Datt Wadi, Part Of Shailesh Nagar			
	38	Part Of Bombay Colony, Santosh Nagar, Part Of Anand Koliwada, Samshad Nagar, Mittal Ground	Part Of Bombay Colony, Santosh Nagar, Part Of Anand Koliwada, Samshad Nagar, Mittal Ground			
	39	Part Of Shailesh Nagar, Part Of Bombay Colony, Part Anand Nagar Koliwada, Ambedkar Nagar, Sanjay Nagar	Part Of Shailesh Nagar, Part Of Bombay Colony, Part Anand Nagar Koliwada, Ambedkar Nagar, Sanjay Nagar			
	40	Part Of Amrut Nagar, Shivaji Nagar,	Part Of Amrut Nagar, Shivaji Nagar,			
	41	Ghaswala Compound, Part Charni Pada, Rashid Compound	Ghaswala Compound, Part Charni Pada, Rashid Compound			
	42	Kausa Stadium, STP, Kausa Cemetery	Kausa Stadium, STP, Kausa Cemetery			
	43	Sabe, Diva	Sabe, Diva			
	44	Dativali, Betwade	Betwade, Mhatardi, Dativali (part), Diva (part, Mumbra Colony Road)			
	45	Aagasan, B R Nagar	Aagasan, B R Nagar			
	46	Desai, Daighar, Kausa Lake	Desai, Daighar (part), Sabe (part), shil (part), Dawale, Padle, Sonkhar, Domkhar, Sagarli, Khidkali. Kausa Lake			
	47	Shil Bypass	Shil (part), Daighar (part), Kausa (part)			

== Taxes in Thane ==
The municipal corporation has recently added a new tax as a substitute for Octroi i.e. Local Body Tax from 1 April 2013. This indirect tax has been repealed.

== Revenue sources ==
The following are the Income sources for the Corporation from the Central and State Government.

=== Revenue from taxes ===
Following is the Tax related revenue for the corporation.

- Property tax.
- Profession tax.
- Entertainment tax.
- Grants from Central and State Government like Goods and Services Tax.
- Advertisement tax.

=== Revenue from non-tax sources ===
Following is the Non Tax related revenue for the corporation.

- Water usage charges.
- Fees from Documentation services.
- Rent received from municipal property.
- Funds from municipal bonds.
- Fines & Penalty & late fees etc.

== List of Mayors ==
#	Name	Term			Election	Party
1	Satish Pradhan	1986	1987			Shiv Sena
2	Vasant Davkhare	1987	1988			Indian National Congress
3	Manohar Salvi	1988	1990			Indian National Congress
4	Mohan Gupte	1990	1991			Indian National Congress
5	Ashoka Raul	1991	1992			Indian National Congress
6	Naeem Khan	1992	1993			Indian National Congress
7	Anant Tare	1993	1996			Shiv Sena
8	Manohar Gadhwe	1996	1997			Shiv Sena
9	Vijaya Deshmukh	1997	1998		1997	Shiv Sena
10	Prem Singh Rajput	1998	1999		1997	Shiv Sena
11	Ramesh Vaity	1999	2002		1997	Shiv Sena
12	Sharda Raut	2002	2005		2002	Shiv Sena
13	Rajan Vichare	2005	2007		2002	Shiv Sena
17	Smita Indulkar	10 March 2007	3 December 2009	2 years, 268 days	2007	Shiv Sena
18	Ashok Vaity	3 December 2009	5 March 2012	2 years, 93 days	2007	Shiv Sena
19	Harish Chandra Patil	6 March 2012	10 September 2014	2 years, 188 days	2012	Shiv Sena
20	Sanjay More	10 September 2014	5 March 2017	2 years, 176 days	2012	Shiv Sena
21	Meenakshi Shinde	6 March 2017	21 November 2019	2 years, 260 days	2017	Shiv Sena
22	Naresh Mhaske	21 November 2019	5 March 2022	2 years, 104 days	2017	Shiv Sena
23	Sharmila Pimplolkar	30 January 2026	Incumbent	276 days	2026	Shiv Sena (SHS)

== Election results ==
=== Results by alliance or party ===
Source
Alliance/ Party		Seats	
Alliance/ Party		Contested	Won
BJP + SHS	BJP	40	28
BJP + SHS	SHS	87	75
BJP + SHS	Mumbra Vikas Aghadi	4	0
BJP + SHS	Total	131	103
SS(UBT) + MNS + NCP(SP)	SS(UBT)	53	1
SS(UBT) + MNS + NCP(SP)	MNS	34	0
SS(UBT) + MNS + NCP(SP)	NCP-SP	36	12
SS(UBT) + MNS + NCP(SP)	Total	123	13
INC		96	0
NCP		75	9
AIMIM		14	5
Independents			1
Total			131

=== 2017 results ===
The results of Election 2017 are shown in the following table. Voter turnout was 58.08%.

Party	Seats	+/-
Shiv Sena (SHS)	67	▲14
Nationalist Congress Party (NCP)	34	Steady
Bharatiya Janata Party (BJP)	23	▲15
Indian National Congress (INC)	3	▼15
All India Majlis-e-Ittehadul Muslimeen (AIMIM)	2	▲2
Independents	2	▼5
Total	131	

=== 2012 results ===
The results of election 2012 are shown in the following table.

Party	Seats
Shiv Sena (SHS)	53
Nationalist Congress Party (NCP)	34
Indian National Congress (INC)	18
Bharatiya Janata Party (BJP)	8
Maharashtra Navnirman Sena (MNS)	7
Bahujan Samaj Party (BSP)	2
Independents	8
Total	130
