= Bhiwandi taluka =

Bhiwandi taluka is a taluka in Thane district of Maharashtra in Konkan division. It contains the city of Bhiwandi.

== Thane district ==
Until 31 July 2014, Thane was the country's most populous district with a population of over 12 Million. On 1 August 2014, the talukas of Mokhada, Jawahar, Talasari, Vikramgadh, Wada, Dahanu, Palghar and Vasai were separated from the erstwhile Thane district to form a new district Palghar. The talukas Thane, Bhiwandi, Kalyan, Ulhasnagar, Ambernath, Murbad and Shahapur were retained in Thane district.

== Demographics ==
Religions in Bhiwandi taluk (2011)
Religion	Percent
Hinduism	56.52%
Islam	38.91%
Buddhism	2.18%
Jainism	1.74%
Other or not stated	0.24%

Bhiwandi taluka has a population of 1,141,386 according to the 2011 census. Bhiwandi had a literacy rate of 79.31% and a sex ratio of 746 females per 1000 males. 863,740 (75.67%) lived in urban areas. Scheduled Castes and Scheduled Tribes make up 3.76% and 8.12% of the population respectively.

Languages of Bhiwandi taluk (2011)
1. Marathi (34.7%)
2. Urdu (34.1%)
3. Hindi (17.8%)
4. Telugu (4.39%)
5. Gujarati (2.41%)
6. Bhojpuri (2.23%)
7. Marwari (1.40%)
8. Others (2.97%)

At the time of the 2011 Census of India, 34.67% of the population in the district spoke Marathi, 34.15% Urdu, 17.78% Hindi, 4.39% Telugu, 2.41% Gujarati, 2.23% Bhojpuri and 1.40% Marwari as their first language.

== See also ==
- Base, Maharashtra
- Kon
