= Shahapur taluka =

Shahapur taluka is a taluka in Thane district of Maharashtra in Konkan division.

== Thane district ==
Until 31 July 2014, Thane was the country's most populous district with a population of over 1.2 crore. On 1 August 2014, the talukas of Mokhada, Jawahar, Talasari, Vikramgadh, Wada, Dahanu, Palghar and Vasai were separated from the erstwhile Thane district to form a new district Palghar. The talukas Thane, Bhiwandi, Kalyan, Ulhasnagar, Ambernath, Murbad and Shahapur were retained in Thane district.

== Demographics ==
Religions in Shahapur taluk (2011)
| Religion | Percent |
| Hinduism | 92.80% |
| Buddhism | 3.94% |
| Islam | 2.64% |
| Other or not stated | 0.62% |

Shahapur taluka has a population of 314,103 according to the 2011 census. Shahapur had a literacy rate of 75.93% and a sex ratio of 957 females per 1000 males. 41,172 (13.11%) are under 7 years of age. 70,710 (22.51%) lived in urban areas. Scheduled Castes and Scheduled Tribes make up 5.74% and 35.72% of the population respectively.

Languages of Shahapur taluk (2011)
1. Marathi (93.9%)
2. Hindi (3.64%)
3. Others (2.45%)

At the time of the 2011 Census of India, 93.91% of the population in the district spoke Marathi and 3.64% Hindi as their first language.
