= Thane taluka =

Sub-urban area in Thane District

Thane taluka is a taluka in Thane district of Maharashtra state in Konkan division.

Thane taluka consists of three municipal corporations—Mira-Bhayandar, Thane and Navi Mumbai—and also few small villages. These three cities lies respectively on northern, north-eastern and eastern boundaries of Mumbai.

Municipal corporation	Population 2011 census	Area in km^{2}
Thane	1,841,488	147
Mira-Bhayandar	809,378	79.4
Navi Mumbai	1,120,547	344
14 villages	15,623	
Total taluka	3,787,046	570 (w/o villages)

== Demographics ==
As per the 2011 Census of India, Thane Taluka has a population of 3,787,036. The sex-ratio of Thane Taluka is around 872 compared to 929 which is the state average of Maharashtra. The literacy rate of Thane Taluka is 79.57% out of which 82.13% males are literate and 76.63% females are literate. The total area of Thane is 400.04 km^{2} with population density of 9,467 per km^{2}.

=== Language ===
Languages of Thane Taluka (2011)
1. Marathi (44.1%)
2. Hindi (22.4%)
3. Urdu (8.73%)
4. Gujarati (6.15%)
5. Bengali (3.01%)
6. Bhojpuri (2.42%)
7. Marwadi (2.27%)
8. Malayalam (1.69%)
9. Kannada (1.66%)
10. Tamil (1.35%)
11. Telugu (1.28%)
12. Others (5.00%)

At the time of the 2011 Census of India in the Thane Taluka, 44.07% of the population in the district spoke Marathi, 22.37% Hindi, 8.73% Urdu, 6.15% Gujarati, 3.01% Bengali, 2.42% Bhojpuri, 2.27% Marwadi, 1.69% Malayalam, 1.66% Kannada, 1.35% Tamil and 1.28% Telugu as their first language.

=== Religion ===
Religions in Thane Taluka (2011)
Religion	Percent
Hinduism	74.83%
Islam	14.81%
Buddhism	4.29%
Christianity	2.90%
Jainism	2.19%
Sikhism	0.57%
Other or not stated	0.42%

== Thane district ==
Until 31 July 2014, Thane was the country's most populous district with a population of over 12 million. On 1 August 2014, the talukas of Mokhada, Jawahar, Talasari, Vikramgadh, Wada, Dahanu, Palghar and Vasai were separated from the erstwhile Thane district to form a new district Palghar. The talukas Thane, Bhiwandi, Kalyan, Ulhasnagar, Ambernath, Murbad and Shahapur were retained in Thane district.
