= Murbad taluka =

Murbad taluka is a taluka in Thane district of Maharashtra in Konkan division.

== Thane district ==
Until 31 July 2014, Thane was the country's most populous district with a population of over 1.2 crore. On 1 August 2014, the talukas of Mokhada, Jawahar, Talasari, Vikramgad, Wada, Dahanu, Palghar and Vasai were separated from the erstwhile Thane district to form a new district Palghar. The talukas Thane, Bhiwandi, Kalyan, Ulhasnagar, Ambernath, Murbad and Shahapur were retained in Thane district.

== Demographics ==
Religions in Murbad taluk (2011)
Religion	Percent
Hinduism	92.29%
Buddhism	4.91%
Islam	2.21%
Other or not stated	0.59%

Murbad taluka has a population of 190,652 according to the 2011 census. Murbad had a literacy rate of 76.17% and a sex ratio of 961 females per 1000 males. 22,938 (12.03%) are under 7 years of age. 18,725 (9.82%) lived in urban areas. Scheduled Castes and Scheduled Tribes make up 5.77% and 24.83% of the population respectively.

Languages of Murbad taluk (2011)
1. Marathi (95.2%)
2. Hindi (3.10%)
3. Others (1.74%)

At the time of the 2011 Census of India, 95.16% of the population in the district spoke Marathi and 3.10% Hindi as their first language.
