= Ulhasnagar taluka =

Administrative division

Ulhasnagar taluka is a taluka in Thane district of Maharashtra in Konkan division.

== Thane district ==
Until 31 July 2014, Thane was the country's most populous district with a population of over 1.2 crore. On 1 August 2014, the talukas of Mokhada, Jawahar, Talasari, Vikramgadh, Wada, Dahanu, Palghar and Vasai were separated from the erstwhile Thane district to form a new district Palghar. The talukas Thane, Bhiwandi, Kalyan, Ulhasnagar, Ambernath, Murbad and Shahapur were retained in Thane district.

== Demographics ==
Religions in Ulhasnagar taluk (2011)
Religion	Percent
Hinduism	82.48%
Buddhism	7.75%
Islam	6.33%
Sikhism	1.73%
Christianity	1.21%
Other or not stated	0.50%

Ulhasnagar taluka has a population of 506,098 according to the 2011 census. Ulhasnagar had a literacy rate of 87.49% and a sex ratio of 881 females per 1000 males. 51,267 (10.13%) are under 7 years of age. The entire population lived in urban areas. Scheduled Castes and Scheduled Tribes make up 17.13% and 1.30% of the population, respectively.

Languages of Ulhasnagar taluk (2011)
1. Marathi (32.3%)
2. Sindhi (31.9%)
3. Hindi (20.6%)
4. Bhojpuri (2.96%)
5. Urdu (1.71%)
6. Gujarati (1.54%)
7. Punjabi (1.54%)
8. Bengali (1.23%)
9. Others (6.25%)

At the time of the 2011 Census of India, 32.28% of the population in the taluk spoke Marathi, 31.92% Sindhi, 20.57% Hindi, 2.96% Bhojpuri, 1.71% Urdu, 1.54% Gujarati, 1.54% Punjabi and 1.23% Bengali as their first language.
