= Kalyan taluka =

Indian local government

Kalyan taluka is a taluka of the Thane district of Maharashtra in Konkan division. It is located between 19°4' and 19°24'N. and 73°1' and 73°24'E with an area of 276 square miles (710 km^{2}). The capital is the city of Kalyan.

The taluka is cubic in form, and in its western part a rich open plain. In the south and east, ranges of hills running parallel with the boundary line throw out spurs into the heart of the plain. The transport of produce is facilitated by the tidal creek of the Ulhas river and by the Great Indian Peninsula Railway. The river Kalu is navigable by boats of 10 tons for 9 miles (14 km) above Kalyan town. There are disagreeable east winds in April and May; but although fever is prevalent in the cold season, the climate is on the whole temperate and healthy.

== History ==
According to the 1901 census (during British rule) the population in 1901 was 77,087, compared with 80,171 in 1891. The density was 279 persons per square mile, or rather more than the District average. In the recent 2011 Census, population of Kalyan Tehsil was found to be 1276614 people.

Land revenue and cesses in 1903-4 amounted to 2-2 lakhs.

== Thane district ==
Until 31 July 2014, Thane was the country's most populous district of India with a population of over 1.2 crore. On 1 August 2014, the talukas of Mokhada, Jawahar, Talasari, Vikramgadh, Wada, Dahanu, Palghar and Vasai were separated from the erstwhile Thane district to form a new district Palghar. The talukas Thane, Bhiwandi, Kalyan, Ulhasnagar, Ambernath, Murbad and Shahapur were retained in Thane district.

== Demographics ==
Religions in Kalyan taluk (2011)
Religion	Percent
Hinduism	82.27%
Buddhism	7.13%
Islam	6.06%
Jainism	2.19%
Christianity	1.89%
Other or not stated	0.46%

Kalyan taluka has a population of 1,565,417 according to the 2011 census. Kalyan had a literacy rate of 90.29% and a sex ratio of 908 females per 1000 males. 162,318 (10.37%) are under 7 years of age. 1,282,225 (81.91%) lived in urban areas. Scheduled Castes and Scheduled Tribes make up 9.70% and 3.48% of the population respectively.

Languages of Kalyan taluk (2011)
1. Marathi (60.9%)
2. Hindi (16.0%)
3. Gujarati (4.29%)
4. Urdu (3.05%)
5. Malayalam (2.65%)
6. Kannada (1.75%)
7. Tamil (1.71%)
8. Bhojpuri (1.64%)
9. Kachhi (1.07%)
10. Marwari (0.99%)
11. Telugu (0.91%)
12. Bengali (0.90%)
13. Others (4.11%)

At the time of the 2011 Census of India, 60.91% of the population in the district spoke Marathi, 16.02% Hindi, 4.29% Gujarati, 3.05% Urdu, 2.65% Malayalam, 1.75% Kannada, 1.71% Tamil, 1.64% Bhojpuri, 1.07% Kachhi, 0.99% Marwari, 0.91% Telugu and 0.90% Bengali as their first language.
