= Ambarnath taluka =

Coordinates: 19.1757163°N 73.1810967°E

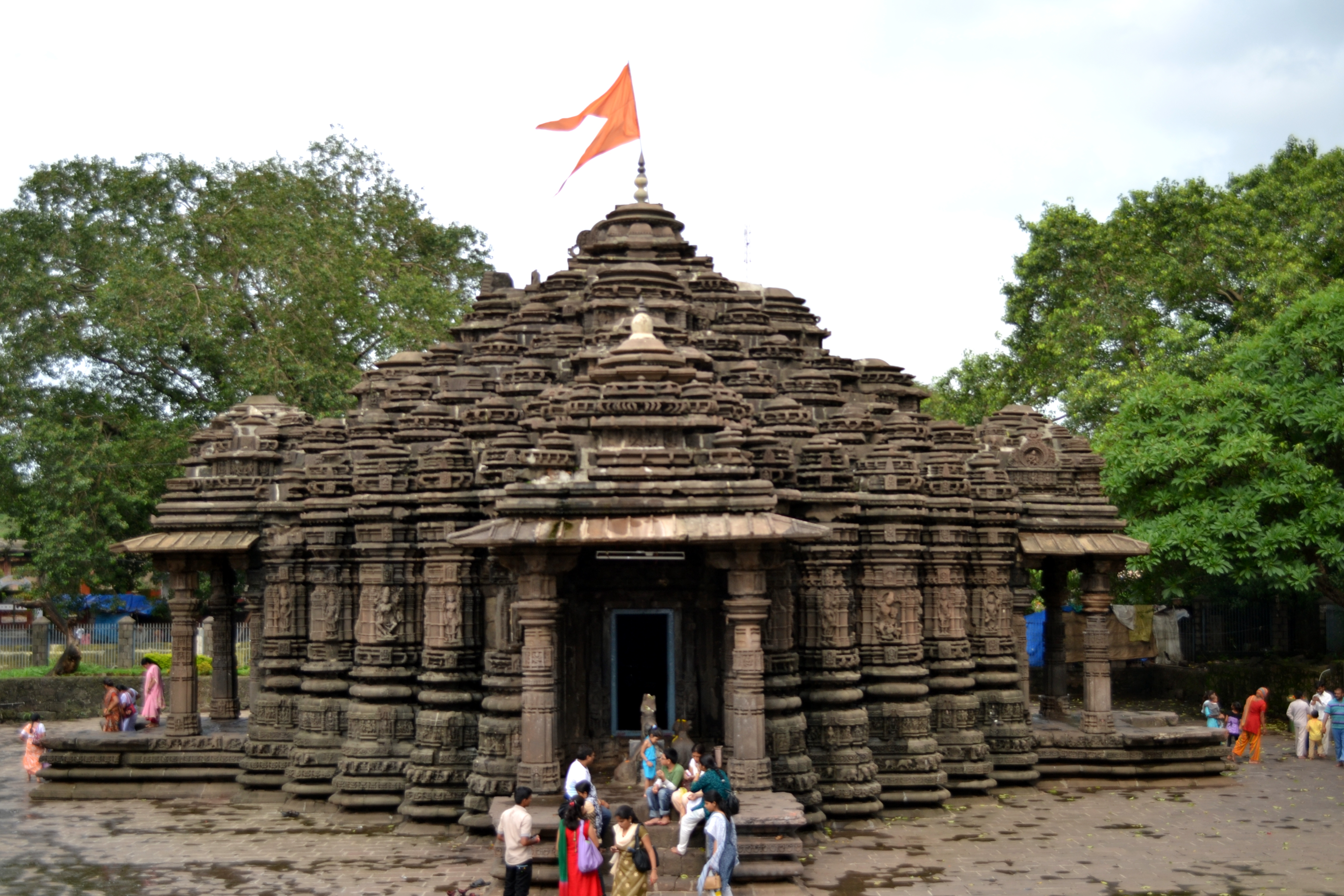
Shiva temple of Ambarnath is a popular Hindu pilgrimage destination.

Ambernath taluka is a taluka in Thane district of Maharashtra in Konkan division. Ambernath taluka consist cities like Ambernath and Badlapur.

== Municipal Civic Bodies ==
Proposed Municipal Corporations:

- Ambernath-Badlapur Municipal Corporation

Municipal Councils:

- Ambernath
- Kulgaon-Badlapur

== Thane district ==
Until 31 July 2014, Thane was the country's most populous district with a population of over 1.2 crore. On 1 August 2014, the talukas of Mokhada, Jawahar, Talasari, Vikramgadh, Wada, Dahanu, Palghar and Vasai were separated from the erstwhile Thane district to form a new district Palghar. The talukas Thane, Bhiwandi, Kalyan, Ulhasnagar, Ambernath, Murbad and Shahapur were retained in Thane district.

== Demographics ==
Religions in Ambarnath taluk (2011)
Religion	Percent
Hinduism	81.64%
Buddhism	7.65%
Islam	6.88%
Christianity	2.79%
Jainism	0.47%
Other or not stated	0.57%

Ambarnath taluka has a population of 565,340 according to the 2011 census. Ambarnath had a literacy rate of 87.07% and a sex ratio of 914 females per 1000 males. 65,053 (11.51%) are under 7 years of age. 440,329 (77.89%) lived in urban areas. Scheduled Castes and Scheduled Tribes make up 13.39% and 6.41% of the population respectively.

Languages of Ambarnath taluk (2011)
1. Marathi (63.6%)
2. Hindi (14.6%)
3. Urdu (3.06%)
4. Telugu (2.93%)
5. Kannada (2.55%)
6. Bhojpuri (2.53%)
7. Tamil (2.34%)
8. Malayalam (1.80%)
9. Gujarati (1.30%)
10. Others (5.25%)

At the time of the 2011 Census of India, 63.61% of the population in the district spoke Marathi, 14.63% Hindi, 3.06% Urdu, 2.93% Telugu, 2.55% Kannada, 2.53% Bhojpuri, 2.34% Tamil, 1.80% Malayalam and 1.30% Gujarati as their first language.
