= Murbad Assembly constituency =

Constituency of the Maharashtra legislative assembly in India

Coordinates: 19.261°N 73.390°E

Murbad
- Constituency No. 139 for the Maharashtra Legislative Assembly
- Kisan Kathore, present MLA of Murbad

Constituency details
- Country: India
- Region: Western India
- State: Maharashtra
- District: Thane
- Lok Sabha constituency: Bhiwandi
- Established: 1957
- Total electors: 470,124
- Reservation: None

Member of Legislative Assembly
- 15th Maharashtra Legislative Assembly
- Incumbent Kisan Kathore
- Party: BJP
- Elected year: 2024

Murbad Assembly constituency is one of the 288 Vidhan Sabha (legislative assembly) constituencies of Maharashtra state, western India. This constituency is located in Thane district.

== Geographical scope ==
The constituency comprises Murbad taluka, parts of Kalyan taluka viz. revenue circles of Titwala, Nadgaon, parts of Ambernath taluka viz. revenue circles Badlapur, Goregaon, Kulgaon-Badlapur Municipal Council, parts of Ambernath revenue circle viz. Manjarli and Kharwai Saja.

== List of Members of Legislative Assembly ==
Year	Member	Party
1957	Thakare Shantaram Balkrishna	Peasants and Workers Party of India
1962	Shantaram Gholap	Indian National Congress
1967	Shantaram Gholap	Indian National Congress
1972	Shantaram Gholap	Indian National Congress
1978	Shantaram Gholap	Indian National Congress
1980	Shantaram Gholap	Indian National Congress
1985	Gotiram Pawar	Indian National Congress
1990	Gotiram Pawar	Indian National Congress
1995	Digambar Vishe	Bharatiya Janata Party
1999	Gotiram Pawar	Nationalist Congress Party
2004	Gotiram Pawar	Nationalist Congress Party
2009	Kisan Kathore	Nationalist Congress Party
2014	Kisan Kathore	Bharatiya Janata Party
2019	Kisan Kathore	Bharatiya Janata Party
2024	Kisan Kathore	Bharatiya Janata Party

== Election results ==
=== Assembly Election 2024 ===
2024 Maharashtra Legislative Assembly election : Murbad
Party	Candidate	Votes	%	±%
BJP	Kisan Shankar Kathore	175,509	55.73%	▼21.26
NCP-SP	Subhash Gotiram Pawar	123,117	39.10%	New
MNS	Sangeeta Mohan Chendvankar	7,894	2.51%	New
NOTA	None of the Above	3,952	1.25%	▼1.75
Independent	Subhash Shantaram Pawar	3,510	1.11%	New
Independent	Shailesh Kesarinath Wadnere	2,252	0.72%	New
Margin of victory		52,392	16.64%	▼43.54
Turnout		318,862	67.83%	▲10.17
Total valid votes		314,910		
Registered electors		470,124		▲18.14
BJP hold		Swing	▼21.26	

=== Assembly Election 2019 ===
2019 Maharashtra Legislative Assembly election : Murbad
Party	Candidate	Votes	%	±%
BJP	Kisan Shankar Kathore	174,068	76.99%	▲38.46
NCP	Pramod Vinayak Hindurao	38,028	16.82%	▼9.90
VBA	Deepak Pandharinath Khambekar	8,504	3.76%	New
NOTA	None of the Above	6,783	3.00%	▲1.47
BSP	Adv.Ratna Kishor Gaikwad	2,003	0.89%	▲0.08
Independent	Pradeep Govind Rokade	1,561	0.69%	New
Margin of victory		136,040	60.17%	▲48.36
Turnout		232,922	58.53%	▼5.54
Total valid votes		226,078		
Registered electors		397,940		▲11.77
BJP hold		Swing	▲38.46	

=== Assembly Election 2014 ===
2014 Maharashtra Legislative Assembly election : Murbad
Party	Candidate	Votes	%	±%
BJP	Kisan Shankar Kathore	85,543	38.53%	▲24.39
NCP	Gotiram Padu Pawar	59,313	26.72%	▼4.56
SS	Waman Barku Mhatre	53,496	24.10%	New
Independent	Capt. Ashish Anand Damle	9,705	4.37%	New
INC	Adv. Rajesh Anant Gholap	3,401	1.53%	New
NOTA	None of the Above	3,394	1.53%	New
BSP	Thorat Shamrao Bhaga	1,781	0.80%	▼0.23
Independent	Suresh Baban Jamdhare	1,630	0.73%	New
Margin of victory		26,230	11.82%	▲8.15
Turnout		225,470	63.33%	▲1.01
Total valid votes		221,995		
Registered electors		356,038		▲22.33
BJP gain from NCP		Swing	▲7.26	

=== Assembly Election 2009 ===
2009 Maharashtra Legislative Assembly election : Murbad
Party	Candidate	Votes	%	±%
NCP	Kisan Shankar Kathore	55,830	31.27%	▼13.21
Independent	Pawar Gotiram Padu	49,288	27.61%	New
MNS	Waman Barku Mhatre	37,080	20.77%	New
BJP	Digambar Narayan Vishe	25,258	14.15%	▼18.43
Independent	Rajratna Ashok Ambedkar	4,666	2.61%	New
BSP	Shoba Shudhodhan Ingale	1,837	1.03%	▼2.02
PWPI	Pisekar Vishnu Pandurang	1,336	0.75%	▼0.72
Margin of victory		6,542	3.66%	▼8.24
Turnout		179,100	61.54%	▼12.06
Total valid votes		178,523		
Registered electors		291,042		▲49.02
NCP hold		Swing	▼13.21	

=== Assembly Election 2004 ===
2004 Maharashtra Legislative Assembly election : Murbad
Party	Candidate	Votes	%	±%
NCP	Gotiram Padu Pawar	63,763	44.48%	▼3.36
BJP	Salvi Rajaram Rama	46,698	32.58%	▲2.14
Independent	Digambar Narayan Vishe	20,782	14.50%	New
BSP	Ingle Shobha Shuddhodhan	4,371	3.05%	▲2.59
Independent	Deshmukh Ramakant Narayanrao	2,782	1.94%	New
PWPI	Sudhir Raut	2,110	1.47%	New
Independent	Telam Dashrath Nama	1,944	1.36%	New
Margin of victory		17,065	11.90%	▼5.50
Turnout		143,414	73.43%	▲15.26
Total valid votes		143,354		
Registered electors		195,301		▲11.35
NCP hold		Swing	▼3.36	

=== Assembly Election 1999 ===
1999 Maharashtra Legislative Assembly election : Murbad
Party	Candidate	Votes	%	±%
NCP	Gotiram Padu Pawar	48,786	47.84%	New
BJP	Digambar Narayan Vishe	31,035	30.43%	▼19.31
INC	Gholap Shantram Gopal	20,979	20.57%	▼22.87
Margin of victory		17,751	17.41%	▲11.10
Turnout		109,291	62.31%	▼14.46
Total valid votes		101,983		
Registered electors		175,401		▲7.49
NCP gain from BJP		Swing	▼1.91	

=== Assembly Election 1995 ===
1995 Maharashtra Legislative Assembly election : Murbad
Party	Candidate	Votes	%	±%
BJP	Vishe Digambar Narayan	58,941	49.75%	▲7.68
INC	Gotiram Padu Pawar	51,471	43.44%	▼9.62
CPI	Bhange Ramesh Narayan Vishe	4,383	3.70%	▲1.70
BSP	Ingle Shobha Shuddhodhan	1,406	1.19%	New
Doordarshi Party	Yadau Shirjan Ramkuber	1,378	1.16%	New
Independent	Bapu Yashwant Patil	904	0.76%	New
Margin of victory		7,470	6.30%	▼4.70
Turnout		122,074	74.81%	▲6.55
Total valid votes		118,483		
Registered electors		163,185		▲14.22
BJP gain from INC		Swing	▼3.32	

=== Assembly Election 1990 ===
1990 Maharashtra Legislative Assembly election : Murbad
Party	Candidate	Votes	%	±%
INC	Gotiram Padu Pawar	50,083	53.06%	▲1.23
BJP	Digambar Narayan Vishe	39,700	42.06%	New
CPI	Bhange Ramesh Narayan Vishe	1,888	2.00%	New
PWPI	Patil Madhav Baburah	1,403	1.49%	▼16.23
Independent	Dilip Lahuji Chandane	743	0.79%	New
Margin of victory		10,383	11.00%	▼13.99
Turnout		96,655	67.65%	▲7.56
Total valid votes		94,383		
Registered electors		142,875		▲22.24
INC hold		Swing	▲1.23	

=== Assembly Election 1985 ===
1985 Maharashtra Legislative Assembly election : Murbad
Party	Candidate	Votes	%	±%
INC	Gotiram Padu Pawar	35,440	51.83%	New
Independent	Gholap Raghunath Ramchandra	18,352	26.84%	New
PWPI	Farde Damodar Lahu	12,116	17.72%	▼19.43
RPI	Ughade Dattu Kondu	1,386	2.03%	New
Independent	Ramesh Bhuraram	622	0.91%	New
Margin of victory		17,088	24.99%	▲0.67
Turnout		69,686	59.62%	▲1.17
Total valid votes		68,376		
Registered electors		116,880		▲13.11
INC gain from INC(I)		Swing	▼9.65	

=== Assembly Election 1980 ===
1980 Maharashtra Legislative Assembly election : Murbad
Party	Candidate	Votes	%	±%
INC(I)	Shantaram Gopal Gholap	36,422	61.48%	▲60.42
PWPI	Krishnarao Dhulap	22,011	37.15%	▲1.09
Independent	More Bhausaheb Balasaheb	449	0.76%	New
Independent	Pal Devnarayan Shivsharan	361	0.61%	New
Margin of victory		14,411	24.33%	▼1.06
Turnout		60,924	58.96%	▼12.87
Total valid votes		59,243		
Registered electors		103,335		▲5.54
INC(I) gain from INC		Swing	▲0.02	

=== Assembly Election 1978 ===
1978 Maharashtra Legislative Assembly election : Murbad
Party	Candidate	Votes	%	±%
INC	Shantaram Gopal Gholap	42,242	61.45%	▲0.84
PWPI	Pharde Damodar Lahu	24,792	36.07%	▲1.72
Independent	Ughade Dattu Kondu	972	1.41%	New
INC(I)	Jhammanlal Saini	731	1.06%	New
Margin of victory		17,450	25.39%	▼0.87
Turnout		71,315	72.84%	▲13.16
Total valid votes		68,737		
Registered electors		97,908		▼5.41
INC hold		Swing	▲0.84	

=== Assembly Election 1972 ===
1972 Maharashtra Legislative Assembly election : Murbad
Party	Candidate	Votes	%	±%
INC	Shantaram Gopal Gholap	35,791	60.61%	▲13.55
PWPI	Namdev Kashinath Aher	20,285	34.35%	New
Independent	Khanderaw Narayan Gaikwad	2,487	4.21%	New
Independent	Shrikrishna Shankar Dighe	488	0.83%	New
Margin of victory		15,506	26.26%	▲12.75
Turnout		61,599	59.51%	▲4.84
Total valid votes		59,051		
Registered electors		103,507		▲21.09
INC hold		Swing	▲13.55	

=== Assembly Election 1967 ===
1967 Maharashtra Legislative Assembly election : Murbad
Party	Candidate	Votes	%	±%
INC	Shantaram Gopal Gholap	21,001	47.06%	▲3.31
RPI	S. B. Yadao	14,972	33.55%	New
Independent	Tulshiram Shivram Dhotre	5,072	11.36%	New
ABJS	B. M. Dhako	3,585	8.03%	▲3.36
Margin of victory		6,029	13.51%	▼2.75
Turnout		50,148	58.67%	▲3.85
Total valid votes		44,630		
Registered electors		85,480		▲30.52
INC hold		Swing	▲3.31	

=== Assembly Election 1962 ===
1962 Maharashtra Legislative Assembly election : Murbad
Party	Candidate	Votes	%	±%
INC	Shantaram Gopal Gholap	13,855	43.74%	▲19.45
PWPI	Mukund Kanu Patil	8,705	27.48%	▼48.23
Independent	Tulshiram Shivram Dhotre	4,454	14.06%	New
Independent	Harishchandra Gopal Shelar	2,886	9.11%	New
ABJS	Purushottam Vinayak Jage	1,481	4.68%	New
Margin of victory		5,150	16.26%	▼35.16
Turnout		35,189	53.73%	▼0.58
Total valid votes		31,675		
Registered electors		65,494		▲6.10
INC gain from PWPI		Swing	▼31.97	

=== Assembly Election 1957 ===
1957 Bombay State Legislative Assembly election : Murbad
Party	Candidate	Votes	%	±%
PWPI	Thakare Shantaram Balkrishna	22,874	75.71%	New
INC	Shelar Harishchandra Gopal	7,339	24.29%	New
Margin of victory		15,535	51.42%	
Turnout		30,213	48.95%	
Total valid votes		30,213		
Registered electors		61,726		
PWPI win (new seat)				
