= Ambernath Assembly constituency =

Constituency of the Maharashtra legislative assembly in India

Coordinates: 19.20°N 73.20°E

Ambarnath
- Constituency No. 140 for the Maharashtra Legislative Assembly

Constituency details
- Country: India
- Region: Western India
- State: Maharashtra
- District: Thane
- Lok Sabha constituency: Kalyan
- Reservation: SC

Member of Legislative Assembly
- 15th Maharashtra Legislative Assembly
- Incumbent Balaji Kinikar
- Party: SHS
- Alliance: NDA
- Elected year: 2024

Ambernath Assembly constituency is one of the 288 Vidhan Sabha (legislative assembly) constituencies of Maharashtra state, western India. This constituency is located in Thane district.

== Geographical scope ==
The constituency comprises parts of Ambernath taluka viz. revenue circles Ambernath (Rural), and Ambernath Municipal Council, parts of Ulhasnagar taluka that is parts of Ulhasnagar Municipal Corporation that is wards 14 to 22 and 44 to 51.

== Members of the Legislative Assembly ==
Year	Member	Party
1978	Jagannath Patil	Janata Party
1980	Nakul Patil	Indian National Congress (I)
1985	Nakul Patil	Indian National Congress
1990	Sabir Shaikh	Shiv Sena
1995	Sabir Shaikh	Shiv Sena
1999	Sabir Shaikh	Shiv Sena
2004	Kisan Kathore	Nationalist Congress Party
2009	Balaji Kinikar	Shiv Sena
2014	Balaji Kinikar	Shiv Sena
2019	Balaji Kinikar	Shiv Sena
2024	Balaji Kinikar	Shiv Sena

== Election results ==
=== Assembly Election 2024 ===
2024 Maharashtra Legislative Assembly election : Ambernath
Party	Candidate	Votes	%	±%
SS	Dr. Balaji Kinikar	111,368	61.13%	▲14.77
SS(UBT)	Rajesh Devendra Wankhede	59,993	32.93%	New
VBA	Sudhir Bagul	4,332	2.38%	▼10.18
NOTA	None of the Above	2,316	1.27%	New
BSP	Kiran Ashok Bhalerao	1,555	0.85%	▼0.16
Margin of victory		51,375	28.20%	▲5.60
Turnout		184,503	49.23%	▲7.55
Total valid votes		182,187		
Registered electors		374,769		▲18.76
SS hold		Swing	▲14.77	

=== Assembly Election 2019 ===
2019 Maharashtra Legislative Assembly election : Ambernath
Party	Candidate	Votes	%	±%
SS	Dr. Balaji Kinikar	60,083	46.36%	▲11.36
INC	Rohit Chandrakant Salve	30,789	23.76%	▲12.04
VBA	Dhananjay Bhimrao Surve	16,274	12.56%	New
MNS	Sumedh Hiraman Bhawar	13,635	10.52%	▲6.70
NOTA	None of the Above	4,322	3.33%	New
NCP	Pravin Motiram Kharat	3,323	2.56%	▼3.93
BSP	Dr. Dhammdeep Hemraj Ganvir	1,310	1.01%	▼1.64
Independent	Kamlakar Nagorao Suryavanshi	874	0.67%	New
Margin of victory		29,294	22.60%	▲21.08
Turnout		133,989	42.46%	▲2.05
Total valid votes		129,597		
Registered electors		315,581		▼8.30
SS hold		Swing	▲11.36	

=== Assembly Election 2014 ===
2014 Maharashtra Legislative Assembly election : Ambernath
Party	Candidate	Votes	%	±%
SS	Dr. Balaji Kinikar	47,000	35.00%	▼9.66
BJP	Rajesh Devendra Wankhede	44,959	33.48%	New
INC	Kamlakar Nagorao Suryawanshi	15,740	11.72%	New
NCP	Mahesh Bharat Tapase	8,722	6.50%	▼20.49
MNS	Dr. Vikas Tukaram Kamble	5,129	3.82%	New
Independent	Shyam Ananda Gaikwad	4,118	3.07%	New
BSP	Prashant Ramesh Ingle	3,557	2.65%	▲0.83
NOTA	None of the Above	2,288	1.70%	New
Margin of victory		2,041	1.52%	▼16.16
Turnout		136,647	39.71%	▲0.42
Total valid votes		134,275		
Registered electors		344,155		▲17.54
SS hold		Swing	▼9.66	

=== Assembly Election 2009 ===
2009 Maharashtra Legislative Assembly election : Ambernath
Party	Candidate	Votes	%	±%
SS	Dr. Balaji Kinikar	50,470	44.66%	▲2.28
NCP	Mahesh Bharat Tapase	30,491	26.98%	▼18.62
Independent	Shyam Ananda Gaikwad	17,007	15.05%	New
Independent	Kamlakar Nagorao Suryawanshi	9,009	7.97%	New
BSP	Ganesh Pandharinath Doke	2,054	1.82%	▼0.20
BBM	Sarang Shyamrao Thorat	1,707	1.51%	New
Margin of victory		19,979	17.68%	▲14.46
Turnout		113,021	38.60%	▼7.48
Total valid votes		113,007		
Registered electors		292,804		▼46.35
SS gain from NCP		Swing	▼0.94	

=== Assembly Election 2004 ===
2004 Maharashtra Legislative Assembly election : Ambernath
Party	Candidate	Votes	%	±%
NCP	Kisan Kathore	114,675	45.60%	New
SS	Sabir Shaikh	106,582	42.38%	▼4.29
Independent	Sudha Naresh Gaikwad	15,184	6.04%	New
SP	Manoj Jeetpratap Singh	6,463	2.57%	▼3.77
BSP	Bhimarao Rupaji Dolas	5,086	2.02%	New
Independent	Kumud Ramdas Bendale	3,484	1.39%	New
Margin of victory		8,093	3.22%	▼7.36
Turnout		251,591	46.09%	▲14.37
Total valid votes		251,474		
Registered electors		545,810		▲24.86
NCP gain from SS		Swing	▼1.07	

=== Assembly Election 1999 ===
1999 Maharashtra Legislative Assembly election : Ambernath
Party	Candidate	Votes	%	±%
SS	Sabir Shaikh	64,674	46.67%	▼6.12
Independent	Pundlik Balu Mhatre	50,015	36.09%	New
SP	Chandrabhan Ramlakhan Yadav	8,789	6.34%	New
BBM	Surajprakash Govind Sharma	7,247	5.23%	New
Independent	Vasudev Savlaram Mhatre	3,921	2.83%	New
ABS	Dasharath Vithal Patil	1,931	1.39%	New
Independent	Kolanchi Kaliyan	1,181	0.85%	New
Margin of victory		14,659	10.58%	▼13.53
Turnout		146,070	33.41%	▼21.66
Total valid votes		138,574		
Registered electors		437,149		▲3.22
SS hold		Swing	▼6.12	

=== Assembly Election 1995 ===
1995 Maharashtra Legislative Assembly election : Ambernath
Party	Candidate	Votes	%	±%
SS	Sabir Shaikh	119,283	52.79%	▲4.48
INC	Nukul Pundalik Patil	64,797	28.68%	▲8.27
JD	Shyam Ananda Gaikwad	20,505	9.07%	▼4.29
Independent	Vishnu Gopal Tare	9,645	4.27%	New
Independent	Kailas Pundalik Brahmane	2,908	1.29%	New
Margin of victory		54,486	24.11%	▼3.80
Turnout		230,986	54.54%	▲0.67
Total valid votes		225,968		
Registered electors		423,514		▲51.13
SS hold		Swing	▲4.48	

=== Assembly Election 1990 ===
1990 Maharashtra Legislative Assembly election : Ambernath
Party	Candidate	Votes	%	±%
SS	Sabir Shaikh	71,322	48.31%	New
INC	Sanjay Satish Dutt	30,121	20.40%	▼18.47
JD	Ratan Buwa Patil	19,729	13.36%	New
Independent	Shyam Ananda Gaikwad	15,733	10.66%	New
Independent	Vilas Pundalik Desai	4,233	2.87%	New
Independent	Goverdhan Bhagat	2,330	1.58%	New
Independent	Parmanand Shewakram Ochani Alias Rajasaheb	956	0.65%	New
Margin of victory		41,201	27.91%	▲18.19
Turnout		150,146	53.58%	▲2.94
Total valid votes		147,631		
Registered electors		280,233		▲46.30
SS gain from INC		Swing	▲9.44	

=== Assembly Election 1985 ===
1985 Maharashtra Legislative Assembly election : Ambernath
Party	Candidate	Votes	%	±%
INC	Nakul Pundalik Patil	37,037	38.87%	New
BJP	Jagannath Patil	27,772	29.15%	▼13.12
Independent	Ratan Joma Mhatre	16,661	17.48%	New
Independent	Ambayane Manohar Harischandra	7,256	7.61%	New
CPI	Padmanabhan V. Govindan	3,142	3.30%	New
Independent	S. M. Sirsat	1,054	1.11%	New
RPI	Sasane Vithal Budhaji	1,044	1.10%	New
Margin of victory		9,265	9.72%	▲4.91
Turnout		97,500	50.90%	▲6.77
Total valid votes		95,289		
Registered electors		191,550		▲23.57
INC gain from INC(I)		Swing	▼8.22	

=== Assembly Election 1980 ===
1980 Maharashtra Legislative Assembly election : Ambernath
Party	Candidate	Votes	%	±%
INC(I)	Nakul Pundalik Patil	31,365	47.08%	New
BJP	Jagannath Patil	28,158	42.27%	New
Independent	Krishna Kalu Gaikwad	3,654	5.49%	New
INC(U)	Jathar Laxman Chintaman	2,823	4.24%	New
Independent	Gupta Lalchand	465	0.70%	New
Margin of victory		3,207	4.81%	▼8.97
Turnout		68,180	43.98%	▼14.30
Total valid votes		66,615		
Registered electors		155,017		▲27.26
INC(I) gain from JP		Swing	▼0.34	

=== Assembly Election 1978 ===
1978 Maharashtra Legislative Assembly election : Ambernath
Party	Candidate	Votes	%	±%
JP	Jagannath Patil	33,087	47.42%	New
INC	Nakul Pundalik Patil	23,470	33.64%	New
PWPI	Master Ambo Daji Kene	5,571	7.98%	New
INC(I)	Tukaram Savalaram Ratnaparkhe	5,138	7.36%	New
RPI(K)	Ramesh Bhaurao	2,503	3.59%	New
Margin of victory		9,617	13.78%	
Turnout		71,794	58.94%	
Total valid votes		69,769		
Registered electors		121,809		
JP win (new seat)				
