= Ministry of Minority Development and Aukaf (Maharashtra) =

Maharashtra government ministry responsible for Minority Development and Aukaf

Ministry of Minority Development and Aukaf Government of Maharashtra
- मंत्रालय अल्पसंख्याक विकास व औकाफ विभाग, महाराष्ट्र शासन
- Seal of the state of Maharashtra

- Building of Administrative Headquarters of Mumbai

Ministry overview
- Jurisdiction: (India) Maharashtra
- Headquarters: Mantralay, Mumbai
- Minister responsible: Sunetra Ajit Pawar, Deputy Chief Minister of Maharashtra and also Minister of Minority Affairs
- Deputy Minister responsible: Madhuri Misal, Minister of State
- Ministry executive: (IAS)
- Parent department: Government of Maharashtra

The Ministry of Minority Development and Aukaf is a Ministry of the Government of Maharashtra. It looks after the affairs of the development of minorities which include Muslims, Sikhs, Christians, Buddhists, Zoroastrians (Parsis) and Jains. These sections are notified as minority communities in the Gazette of India under Section 2(c) of the National Commission for Minorities Act, 1992. for the development of Maharashtra state.

The Ministry is headed by a cabinet level Minister. Sunetra Ajit Pawar is Current Deputy Chief Minister and Minister of Minority Development and Aukaf Government of Maharashtra.

== Head office ==
Minister of Minority Development and Aukaf मंत्री अल्पसंख्याक विकास व औकाफ विभाग
- Emblem of India

- Flag of India
- Incumbent; Sunetra Ajit Pawar (Deputy Chief Minister) since 31 January 2026
- Ministry of Minority Development and Aukaf (Maharashtra)
- Style: The Honourable
- Abbreviation: Cabinet Minister
- Member of: State Cabinet
- Reports to: Chief Minister, & Maharashtra Legislature
- Seat: Mantralaya, Mumbai
- Appointer: Governor on the advice of the Chief Minister
- Term length: 5 years
- Precursor: Devendra Fadnavis (2026-2026)
- Inaugural holder: Abdul Kader Salebhoy (1960-1962)
- Formation: 1 May 1960
- Deputy: Madhuri Misal

== Cabinet Ministers ==
No.	Portrait	Minister (Constituency)	Term of office			Political party	Ministry	Chief Minister
No.	Portrait	Minister (Constituency)	From	To	Period	Political party	Ministry	Chief Minister
Minister of Minority Development and Aukaf
01		Sultan. G. Kazi (MLC for Elected by Local Authorities Constituency No. 14 - Ahmednagar District) (Legislative Council)	01 May 1960	07 March 1962	1 year, 310 days	Indian National Congress	Yashwantrao I	Yashwantrao Chavan
02		Abdul Kader Salebhoy (MLA for Mumbai South Central Constituency No. 180- Mumbai City District) (Legislative Assembly)	08 March 1962	19 November 1962	256 days	Indian National Congress	Yashwantrao II	Yashwantrao Chavan
03		Abdul Kader Salebhoy (MLA for Mumbai South Central Constituency No. 180- Mumbai City District) (Legislative Assembly)	20 November 1962	24 November 1963	1 year, 4 days	Indian National Congress	Kannamwar l	Marotrao Kannamwar
04		P. K. Sawant (MLA for Chiplun Constituency No. 265- Ratnagiri District) (Legislative Assembly) (Interim Chief Minister)	25 November 1962	04 December 1963	9 days	Indian National Congress	Sawant	P. K. Sawant
05		Balasaheb Desai (MLA for Patan Constituency No. 261- Satara District) (Legislative Assembly)	05 December 1963	01 March 1967	3 years, 86 days	Indian National Congress	Vasantrao I	Vasantrao Naik
06		Shankarrao Chavan (MLA for Bhokar Constituency No. 85- Nanded District) (Legislative Assembly)	01 March 1967	27 October 1969	2 years, 240 days	Indian National Congress	Vasantrao II	Vasantrao Naik
07		Pratibha Patil (MLA for Jalgaon City Constituency No. 13- Jalgaon District) (Legislative Assembly)	27 October 1969	13 March 1972	2 years, 138 days	Indian National Congress	Vasantrao II	Vasantrao Naik
08		Abdul Rahman Antulay (MLA for Shrivardhan Constituency No. 193- Raigad District) (Legislative Assembly)	13 March 1972	04 April 1973	1 year, 32 days	Indian National Congress	Vasantrao III	Vasantrao Naik
09		Rafique Zakaria (MLC for Elected by MLAs Constituency No. 16 - Mumbai Suburban District) (Legislative Council)	04 April 1973	17 Match; 1974	347 days	Indian National Congress	Vasantrao III	Vasantrao Naik
10		Abdul Rahman Antulay (MLA for Shrivardhan Constituency No. 193- Raigad District) (Legislative Assembly)	17 Match; 1974	21 February 1975	341 days	Indian National Congress	Vasantrao III	Vasantrao Naik
11		Rafiq Zakaria (MLC for Elected by MLAs Constituency No. 16 - Mumbai Suburban District) (Legislative Council)	21 February 1975	23 February 1976	1 year, 2 days	Indian National Congress	Shankarrao I	Shankarrao Chavan
12		Prabha Rau (MLA for Pulgaon Constituency No. 41- Wardha District) (Legislative Assembly)	23 February 1976	16 April 1977	1 year, 52 days	Indian National Congress	Shankarrao I	Shankarrao Chavan
13		Pratibha Patil (MLA for Jalgaon City Constituency No. 13- Jalgaon District) (Legislative Assembly)	17 April 1977	07 March 1978	1 year, 324 days	Indian National Congress	Vasantdada I	Vasantdada Patil
14		Baburao Kale (MLA for Ghansavangi Jalna Constituency No. 190- Jalna District) (Legislative Assembly)	07 March 1978	18 July 1978	133 days	Indian National Congress	Vasantdada II	Vasantdada Patil
15		Nihal Ahmed Maulavi Mohammed Usman (MLA for Malegaon Central Constituency No. 114- Nashik District) (Legislative Assembly)	18 July 1978	17 February 1980	1 year, 214 days	Janata Party	Pawar I	Sharad Pawar
16		Abdul Rahman Antulay (MLA for Shrivardhan Constituency No. 193- Raigad District) (Legislative Assembly) (Chief Minister)	09 June 1980	21 January 1982	1 year, 226 days	Indian National Congress	Antulay	Abdul Rahman Antulay
17		S. M. I. Aseer (MLA for Ahmednagar South Constituency No. 223- Ahmednagar District (Legislative Assembly)	21 January 1982	02 February 1983	1 year, 12 days	Indian National Congress	Bhosale	Babasaheb Bhosale
18		S. M. I. Aseer (MLA for Ahmednagar South Constituency No. 223- Ahmednagar District (Legislative Assembly)	07 February 1983	05 March 1985	2 years, 26 days	Indian National Congress	Vasantdada III	Vasantdada Patil
19		Narendra Mahipati Tidke (MLA for Savner Constituency No. 49- Nagpur District) (Legislative Assembly)	12 March 1985	03 June 1985	83 days	Indian National Congress	Vasantdada IV	Vasantdada Patil
20		Sushilkumar Shinde (MLA for Solapur City Central Constituency No. 249- Solapur District) (Legislative Assembly)	03 June 1985	12 March 1986	282 days	Indian National Congress	Nilangekar	Shivajirao Patil Nilangekar
21		V. Subramanian (MLA for South Mumbai Constituency No. 121- Mumbai City District) (Legislative Assembly)	12 March 1986	26 June 1988	2 years, 106 days	Indian National Congress	Shankarrao II	Shankarrao Chavan
22		Ishaq Jamkhanawala (MLA for Nagpada Constituency No. 188- Mumbai City District (Legislative Assembly)	26 June 1988	03 March 1990	1 year, 250 days	Indian National Congress	Pawar II	Sharad Pawar
23		Javed Iqbal Khan (MLA for Trombay Constituency No. 177- Mumbai Suburban District) (Legislative Assembly)	04 March 1990	25 June 1991	1 year, 113 days	Indian National Congress	Pawar III	Sharad Pawar
24		Padamsinh Bajirao Patil (MLA for Osmanabad Constituency No. 242- Osmanabad District (Legislative Assembly)	25 June 1991	22 February 1993	1 year, 242 days	Indian National Congress	Sudhakarrao	Sudhakarrao Naik
25		Sarawan Parate (MLC for Elected by MLAs Constituency No. 14 - Kolhapur District) (Legislative Council)	06 March 1993	14 March 1995	2 years, 8 days	Indian National Congress	Pawar IV	Sharad Pawar
26		Sabir Shaikh (MLA for Ambarnath Constituency No. 140- Thane District) (Legislative Assembly)	14 March 1995	01 February 1999	3 years, 324 days	Shiv Sena	Joshi	Manohar Joshi
27		Sabir Shaikh (MLA for Ambarnath Constituency No. 140- Thane District) (Legislative Assembly)	01 February 1999	17 October 1999	258 days	Shiv Sena	Rane	Narayan Rane
28		Husain Dalwai (MLA for Ratnagiri Khed Constituency No. 266- Ratnagiri District) (Legislative Assembly)	19 October 1999	16 January 2003	3 years, 89 days	Indian National Congress	Deshmukh I	Vilasrao Deshmukh
29		Husain Dalwai (MLA for Ratnagiri Khed Constituency No. 266- Ratnagiri District) (Legislative Assembly)	18 January 2003	01 November 2004	1 year, 295 days	Indian National Congress	Sushilkumar	Sushilkumar Shinde
30		Vilasrao Deshmukh (MLA for Latur City Constituency No. 235- Latur District) (Legislative Assembly) (Chief Minister)	01 November 2004	09 November 2004	8 days	Indian National Congress	Deshmukh II	Vilasrao Deshmukh
31		Anees Ahmed (MLA for Nagpur Central Constituency No. 55- Nagpur District (Legislative Assembly)	09 November 2004	01 December 2008	4 years, 22 days	Indian National Congress	Deshmukh II	Vilasrao Deshmukh
32		Anees Ahmed (MLA for Nagpur Central Constituency No. 55- Nagpur District (Legislative Assembly)	08 December 2008	06 November 2009	333 days	Indian National Congress	Ashok I	Ashok Chavan
33		Mohammad Naseem Khan (MLA for Chandivali Constituency No. 168- Mumbai Suburban District) (Legislative Assembly)	07 November 2009	10 November 2010	1 year, 3 days	Indian National Congress	Ashok II	Ashok Chavan
34		Mohammad Naseem Khan (MLA for Chandivali Constituency No. 168- Mumbai Suburban District) (Legislative Assembly)	11 November 2010	26 September 2014	3 years, 319 days	Indian National Congress	Prithviraj	Prithviraj Chavan
35		Eknath Khadse (MLA for Muktainagar Constituency No. 20- Jalgaon District) (Legislative Assembly)	31 October 2014	04 June 2016	1 year, 217 days	Bharatiya Janata Party	Fadnavis I	Devendra Fadnavis
36		Devendra Fadnavis (MLA for Nagpur South West Constituency No. 52- Nagpur District) (Legislative Assembly) (Chief Minister)	04 June 2016	08 July 2016	34 days	Bharatiya Janata Party	Fadnavis I	Devendra Fadnavis
37		Vinod Tawde (MLA for Borivali Constituency No. 152- Mumbai Suburban District (Legislative Assembly)	08 July 2016	12 November 2019	3 years, 127 days	Bharatiya Janata Party	Fadnavis I	Devendra Fadnavis
38		Devendra Fadnavis (MLA for Nagpur South West Constituency No. 52- Nagpur District) (Legislative Assembly) (Chief Minister) (In Charge)	23 November 2019	28 November 2019	5 days	Bharatiya Janata Party	Fadnavis II	Devendra Fadnavis
39		Jayant Patil (MLA for Islampur Constituency No. 283- Sangli District) (Legislative Assembly)	28 November 2019	30 December 2019	32 days	Nationalist Congress Party	Thackeray	Uddhav Thackeray
40		Nawab Malik (MLA for Anushakti Nagar Constituency No. 172- Mumbai Suburban District) (Legislative Assembly)	30 December 2019	27 March 2022	2 years, 87 days	Nationalist Congress Party	Thackeray	Uddhav Thackeray
41		Jitendra Awhad (MLA for Mumbra-Kalwa Constituency No. 149- Thane District (Legislative Assembly)	27 March 2022	29 June 2022	94 days	Nationalist Congress Party	Thackeray	Uddhav Thackeray
42		Eknath Shinde (MLA for Kopri-Pachpakhadi Constituency No. 147- Thane District) (Legislative Assembly) (Chief Minister) (In Charge)	30 June 2022	14 August 2022	45 days	Shiv Sena (2022–present)	Eknath	Eknath Shinde
43		Eknath Shinde (MLA for Kopri-Pachpakhadi Constituency No. 147- Thane District) (Legislative Assembly) (Chief Minister)	14 August 2022	14 July 2023	334 days	Shiv Sena (2022–present)	Eknath	Eknath Shinde
44		Abdul Sattar Abdul Nabi (MLA for Sillod Constituency No. 104- Chhatrapati Sambhaji Nagar District Also Previously Known Aurangabad District (Legislative Assembly)	14 July 2023	26 November 2024	1 year, 135 days	Shiv Sena (2022–present)	Eknath	Eknath Shinde
45		Devendra Fadnavis (MLA for Nagpur South West Constituency No. 52- Nagpur District) (Legislative Assembly) (Chief_Minister); In Charge	05 December 2024	21 December 2024	16 days	Bharatiya Janata Party	Fadnavis III	Devendra Fadnavis
46		Dattatray Vithoba Bharne (MLA for Indapur Constituency No. 200- Pune District (Legislative Assembly)	21 December 2024	31 July 2025	222 days	Nationalist Congress Party	Fadnavis III	Devendra Fadnavis
47		Manikrao Kokate (MLA for Sinnar Constituency No. 120- Nashik District (Legislative Assembly)	31 July 2025	17 December 2025	140 days	Nationalist Congress Party	Fadnavis III	Devendra Fadnavis
48		Ajit Pawar (MLA for Baramati Constituency No. 201- Pune District (Legislative Assembly) (Deputy Chief Minister); Additional Charge	17 December 2025	28 January 2026	42 days	Nationalist Congress Party	Fadnavis III	Devendra Fadnavis
49		Devendra Fadnavis (MLA for Nagpur South West Constituency No. 52- Nagpur District) (Legislative Assembly) (Chief Minister); Additional Charge	28 January 2026	31 January 2026	3 days	Bharatiya Janata Party	Fadnavis III	Devendra Fadnavis
50		Sunetra Ajit Pawar (Not Elected Any Constituency of Maharashtra Legislature- Pune District) (Legislative Assembly / Legislative Council) (Deputy Chief Minister)	31 January 2026	Incumbent	281 days	Nationalist Congress Party	Fadnavis III	Devendra Fadnavis

== Ministers of State ==
No.	Portrait	Deputy Minister (Constituency)	Term of office			Political party	Ministry	Minister	Chief Minister
No.	Portrait	Deputy Minister (Constituency)	From	To	Period	Political party	Ministry	Minister	Chief Minister
Deputy Minister of Minority Development and Aukaf
Vacant			23 November 2019	28 November 2019	5 days	NA	Fadnavis II	Devendra Fadnavis	Devendra Fadnavis
01		Vishwajeet Kadam (MLA for Palus-Kadegaon Constituency No. 285- Sangli District) (Legislative Assembly)	30 December 2019	29 June 2022	2 years, 181 days	Indian National Congress	Thackeray	Nawab Malik (2019 - 2021); Jitendra Awhad (2021 - 2022)	Uddhav Thackeray
Vacant			30 June 2022	26 November 2024	2 years, 149 days	NA	Eknath	Eknath Shinde (2022 - 2023); Abdul Sattar Abdul Nabi (2023 - 2024)	Eknath Shinde
02		Madhuri Misal (MLA for Parvati Constituency No. 212- Pune District) (Legislative Assembly)	21 December 2024	incumbent	1 year, 322 days	Bharatiya Janata Party	Fadnavis III	Dattatray Vithoba Bharne (2024 – 2025); Manikrao Kokate (2025 – 2025); Ajit Pawar Additional Charge (2025 – 2026); Devendra Fadnavis Additional Charge (2026 – 2026); Sunetra Pawar (2026 – Present)	Devendra Fadnavis

== Sub department ==
Maharashtra State Board of Waqfs
