= Nandiwali Tarf Pachanand =

Village in Maharashtra, India

- Village
- Location within Maharashtra Location within India
- Coordinates: 19°12′44″N 73°07′56″E
- Country: India
- State: Maharashtra
- District: Thane
- Taluka: Kalyan

Government
  - Type: Sarpanch

Area
  - Total: 1.7 km^{2} (0.66 sq mi)
- Elevation: 13 m (43 ft)

Population (2011)
  - Total: 36,163
  - Density: 21,000/km^{2} (55,000/sq mi)

Languages
  - Official: Marathi
  - Other: Hindi, English
- Time zone: UTC+5:30 (IST)
- PIN: 421201
- STD code: 0251
- Vehicle registration: MH-05

Nandiwali Tarf Pachanand is a village in Kalyan Taluka, Thane District, Maharashtra, India. It is located near the western coast of India, about 14 kilometres east of the district capital Thane, and 3 kilometres south of the taluka capital Kalyan. In 2011, its population is 36,163.

== Geography ==
Nandiwali Tarf Pachanand is situated to the south of Ulhas River. It is located to the south of Kalyan, west of Ulhasnagar, north of Nevali Gaon, and east of Dombivli. It covers an area of 170.02 hectares.

== Demographics ==
According to the 2011 Census of India, there are 9,087 households in Nandiwali Tarf Pachanand. Among the 36,163 residents, 19,095 are male and 17,068 are female. The total literacy rate is 82.82%, with 16,278 of the male population and 13,671 of the female population being literate. Its census location code is 552985.
