= Khanivali =

Village in Maharashtra

- village
- Location in Maharashtra, India Khanivali (India)
- Coordinates: 19.5958828°N 73.0597125°E
- Country: India
- State: Maharashtra
- District: Palghar
- Taluka: Wada
- Elevation: 34 m (112 ft)

Population (2011)
  - Total: 964
- Time zone: UTC+5:30 (IST)
- 2011 census code: 552615

Khanivali is a village in the Palghar district of Maharashtra, India. It is located in the Wada taluka.

== Demographics ==
According to the 2011 census of India, Khanivali has 228 households. The effective literacy rate (i.e. the literacy rate of population excluding children aged 6 and below) is 64.18%.

Demographics (2011 Census)
	Total	Male	Female
Population	964	477	487
Children aged below 6 years	160	74	86
Scheduled caste	0	0	0
Scheduled tribe	730	374	356
Literates	516	296	220
Workers (all)	391	257	134
Main workers (total)	306	203	103
Main workers: Cultivators	51	45	6
Main workers: Agricultural labourers	130	80	50
Main workers: Household industry workers	5	1	4
Main workers: Other	120	77	43
Marginal workers (total)	85	54	31
Marginal workers: Cultivators	7	2	5
Marginal workers: Agricultural labourers	24	20	4
Marginal workers: Household industry workers	1	1	0
Marginal workers: Others	53	31	22
Non-workers	573	220	353
