= Balaji Kinikar =

Indian politician

Member of the Maharashtra Legislative Assembly
- Incumbent
- Assumed office 2009
- Preceded by: Kisan Kathore
- Constituency: Ambernath

Personal details
- Born: 25 March 1972 (age 54) Latur, Maharashtra, India
- Party: Shiv Sena
- Education: Nair Dental College
- Website: drbalajikinikar.com

Balaji Kinikar is a Shiv Sena politician from Ambernath, Maharashtra. He was a member of the Maharashtra Legislative Assembly from Ambernath Vidhan Sabha constituency, Maharashtra, India. He has been elected for 4 consecutive terms to the Maharashtra Legislative Assembly in 2009,2014,2019 and 2024.

== Controversy ==
On 26 December, Kinikar led a group of fellow Shiv Sena workers outside the office of Maharashtra Industrial Development Corporation executive engineer Sanjay Nanavare in Thane, concerning water shortage being faced by residents of Ulhasnagar. During the discussion with Nanavare, SS Ulhasnagar city president Rajendra Chowdhary, party corporator Ramesh Chavan and two others ransacked the office and smashed Nanavare's cell phone on a table and threw chairs at him. The four were arrested and charged with criminal force to deter a public servant from discharging his duty, voluntarily causing hurt to deter a public servant from his duty, mischief, intentional insult, and criminal intimidation.

== Positions held ==
- 2009: Elected to Maharashtra Legislative Assembly (1st term)
- 2014: Re-Elected to Maharashtra Legislative Assembly (2nd term)
- 2019: Re-Elected to Maharashtra Legislative Assembly (3rd term)
- 2024: Re-Elected to Maharashtra Legislative Assembly (4th term)
