= Kon, India =

Kon
- Census town
- Location in Maharashtra, India
- Coordinates: 19.2489°N 73.106°E
- Country: India
- State: Maharashtra
- District: Thane

Population (2001)
  - Total: 15,167

Languages
  - Official: Marathi
- Time zone: UTC+5:30 (IST)

Kon is a census town in Thane district in the Indian state of Maharashtra.

== Demographics ==
As of 2001 India census, Kon had a population of 15,167. Males constitute 53% of the population and females 47%. Kon has an average literacy rate of 76%, higher than the national average of 59.5%: male literacy is 81%, and female literacy is 70%. In Kon, 15% of the population is under 6 years of age.
