= Sabir Shaikh =

Indian politician

The Honourable Sabir Shaikh

Minister of Labour Employment
- In office 1995–1999
- Chief Minister: Manohar Joshi; Narayan Rane
- Preceded by: Sarawan Parate
- Succeeded by: Husain Dalwai

Minister of Minority Development and Aukaf
- In office 1995–1999
- Preceded by: Sarawan Parate
- Succeeded by: Husain Dalwai

Member of Maharashtra Legislative Assembly
- In office 1990–2004
- Preceded by: Nakul Patil
- Succeeded by: Kisan Kathore
- Constituency: Ambernath

Personal details
- Born: 15 March 1943 Narayangaon, British India (Now Maharashtra, India)
- Died: 15 October 2014 (aged 71)
- Party: Shiv Sena
- Occupation: Politician

Sabir Shaikh (15 March 1943 - 15 October 2014) was an Indian politician. He was a leader of Shiv Sena and a Former cabinet minister in the Government of Maharashtra. He was elected to Maharashtra Legislative Assembly in 1999 from Ambernath constituency. He held Labour and Employment portfolio. He was Muslim face of Shiv Sena and close aide of Balasaheb Thackeray. Shaikh died on 15 October 2014, after a prolonged illness.

== Positions held ==
- 1990: Elected to Maharashtra Legislative Assembly (1st term)
- 1995: Re-elected to Maharashtra Legislative Assembly (2nd term)
- 1995: Cabinet Minister of Labour and Employment, Maharashtra
- 1999: Re-elected to Maharashtra Legislative Assembly (3rd term)

== See also ==
- Manohar Joshi ministry
- Narayan Rane ministry
