= Savata Mali =

Hindu saint

Savata Mali संत सावता माळी
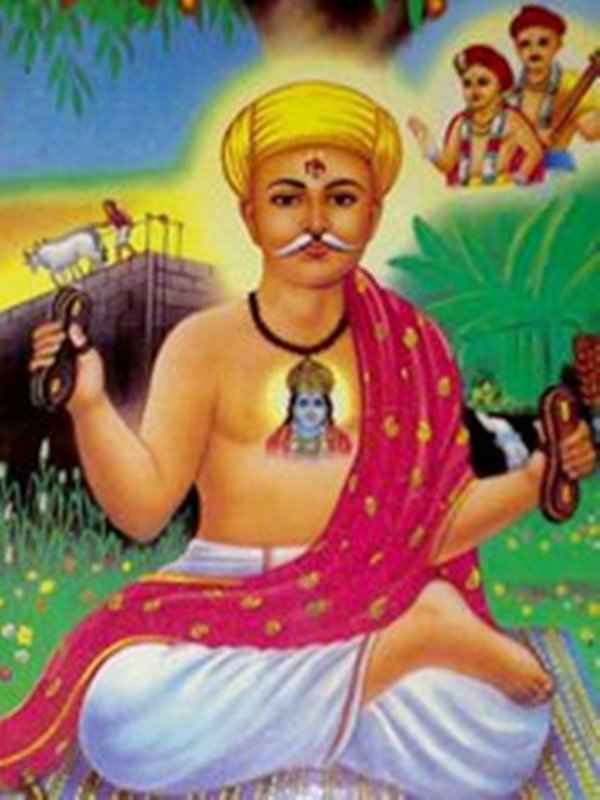

Personal life
- Born: 1250 Arangaon, near Pandharpur; Maharashtra, India
- Died: 1295 (aged 44–45)
- Known for: Abhanga devotional poetry, Marathi poet-sant of Bhakti movement

Religious life
- Religion: Hinduism
- Order: Mali caste
- Sect: Varkari-Vaishnavism of Hinduism

Quotation

कांदा, मुळा,भाजी अवघी विठाई माझी

Savata Mali was a 12th-century Hindu saint. He was a contemporary of Namdev, and a devotee of Vithoba.

For financial reasons, his grandfather, Devu Mali, moved to the Arangaon/Aran-behndi, which is near the Modnimb, Solapur district. Devu Mali had two sons, namely, Parasu (Savata's father) and Dongre. Parasu married Nangitabai; they lived in poverty, but remained devoted Bhagwat followers. Dongre died at young age. In 1250, Parasu and Nangitabai had a son, whom they named Savata Mali.

Having grown up in a religious family, Savata married a very religious and devoted Hindu from Bhend village named Janabai. While working in his fields in the village of Aran, Savata Mali used to sing about the glory of Vithoba. They believed that Vithoba came to him since Savata Mali was unable to make a pilgrimage to the temple of Vithoba. He angered his wife once when he ignored his visiting in-laws because he was so busy in his bhakti, but Janabai's anger was swiftly cooled down because of Savata's kind and peaceful words.

A temple dedicated to him exists in Aran.

== See also ==
- Hindu reform movements
