= Jagannath Patil =

Indian politician

Jagannath Shivram Patil is an Indian politician and member of the Bharatiya Janata Party. Patil was a member of the Maharashtra Legislative Assembly from Ambernath in 1978 and Kalyan in 1995. He was of Tourism and State Excise in Manohar Joshi ministry from 1995 to 1999) in 1990s. He was also member of Lok Sabha from Thane constituency in 1980s.
