= Abdul Kader Salebhoy =

Indian politician (born 1913)

Member of Parliament, Lok Sabha
- In office 1971–1977
- Preceded by: Shripad Amrit Dange
- Succeeded by: B. C. Kamble
- Constituency: Mumbai South Central

Personal details
- Born: 4 May 1913
- Party: Indian National Congress
- Spouse: Rubab

Dr. Abdul Kader Salebhoy (born 4 May 1913, date of death unknown) was an Indian politician, elected to the Lok Sabha, the lower house of the Parliament of India as a member of the Indian National Congress.
