= Kisan Kathore =

Indian politician

Kisan Shankar Kathore
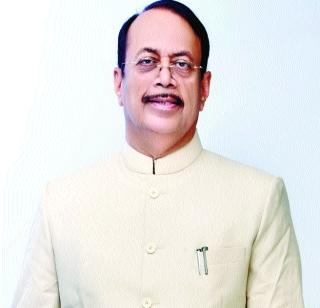

Member of Maharashtra Legislative Assembly
- In office October 13th, 2009 – Incumbent
- Preceded by: Gotiram Pawar
- Constituency: Murbad

Personal details
- Born: 19 September 1955 (age 70) At-PatilPada, Post-Pimploli, Tal-Ambernath, Thane, Maharashtra
- Party: Bharatiya Janata Party
- Other political affiliations: Nationalist Congress Party
- Spouse: Kamal Kisan Kathore,
- Relatives: Yashwant Shankar Kathore (Brother)
- Profession: Politician
- As of 16 October 2015

Kisan Shankar Kathore (born 19 September 1955) is politician from Ambernath, Thane, in Maharashtra state of India. He was Sarpanch of Sagaon Group Gram Panchayat (Tal-Ambernath) between 1978 and 1992. He also worked as President of Thane Zilla Parishad from 2002 to 2004. He moved from Nationalist Congress Party to Bharatiya Janata Party in October 2014.

He contested 2004 Maharashtra Legislative Assembly election from Ambernath as NCP candidate. He defeated Shiv Sena strong leader & former Labour Minister Sabir Shaikh. After the Delimitation of Assembly Constituency of 2008, his Ambernath constituency became reserved for SC. Therefore, he contested 2009 Maharashtra Legislative Assembly election from Murbad seat and defeated NCP rebel & four-term MLA Gotiram Pawar. In the 2014 assembly election, he switched to BJP & won again for a third term from Murbad.

== Positions held ==
- Sarpanch, Sagaon Group Gram Panchayat (1978–1992)
- President, Sarpanch Union (1982–1985)
- Chairman, Ulhasnagar Taluka Sanjay Gandhi Niradhar Yojana 1982
- President, Sarpanch Union Ulhasnagar Taluka
- Chairman, Ulhasnagar Panchayat Samiti 1992–97
- Member, District Planning and Development Corporation (1995–1997)
- Treasurer, Kunbi Samaj Sanghatana, Dist.- Thane (1998–2003)
- Chairman, Thane Z.P. Construction Committee
- Member, Thane Dist. Dakshata Committee
- Member, Legal Help & Advice Committee, Thane District
- President, D.E.D.A. Thane District
- President, Thane Z.P. 2002
- M.L.A. (156 Ambernath Assembly Area 2004–2009)
- President, Panchyat Raj Committee 2005–07
- President, Assurance Committee 2007–09
- M.L.A. (139 Murbad Assembly Area 2009–2014) for 2nd term
- Vice President, Konkan Irrigation Development Corporation (2009–2014)
- M.L.A. (139 Murbad Assembly Area 2014–2019) for 3rd term
- M.L.A. (139 Murbad Assembly Area 2019–2024) for 4th term
- M.L.A. (139 Murbad Assembly Area 2024) for 5th term
