= Taloli =

Village in Maharashtra

- village
- Country: India
- State: Maharashtra

Languages
  - Official: Urdu, English, Marathi
- Time zone: UTC+5:30 (IST)
- PIN: 415719
- Vehicle registration: MH-

Taloli (alternatively Talavali) is a village in India. It has a population of about 3000. The village has a mosque called Jama Masjid Ahle-Hadess, Taloli [1]. The villagers are Muslims following authentic Salaf us Saalih creed (normally called Ahl al-Hadith in the sub-continent. Translation of "Ahl al-Hadith" is "Followers of the traditions and sayings of Muhammad".) It is a small rustic town about 8–10 km from Bhiwandi.
