= Dhodia–Kukna language =

Language

Dhodia–Kukna
- Native to: India
- Region: Gujarat
- Ethnicity: Kokna, Dhodia
- Native speakers: 470,000 (2011 census)
- Language family: Indo-European: Indo-Iranian; Indo-Aryan; Western; Bhil; Central; Dhodia–Kukna
- Writing system: Gujarati

Language codes
- ISO 639-3: Either: dho – Dhodia kex – Kukna
- Glottolog: dhod1238

The tribal Kukna (Kokna) speak Kukna and Dhodia speak Dhodia in parts of Gujarat, Dadra and Nagar Haveli and Daman and Diu, Madhya Pradesh, Maharashtra and Rajasthan.
