= Jawahar taluka =

Jawahar taluka is a taluka in the Palghar district of Maharashtra.

== Thane district ==
On 1 August 2014, the talukas of Mokhada, Jawahar, Talasari, Vikramgadh, Wada, Dahanu, Palghar and Vasai were separated from the erstwhile Thane district to form a new district Palghar.

== Demographics ==
Religions in Jawahar taluk (2011)
| Religion | Percent |
| Hinduism | 96.53% |
| Islam | 2.47% |
| Buddhism | 0.48% |
| Other or not stated | 0.52% |

Jawahar taluka has a population of 140,187 according to the 2011 census. Jawahar had a literacy rate of 57.42% and a sex ratio of 1022 females per 1000 males. 23,284 (16.61%) are under 7 years of age. 12,040 (8.59%) lived in urban areas. Scheduled Castes and Scheduled Tribes make up 1.03% and 91.64% of the population respectively.

Languages of Jawahar taluk (2011)
1. Marathi (82.2%)
2. Varli (9.84%)
3. Kokna (2.09%)
4. 'Other' Marathi (2.05%)
5. Hindi (1.51%)
6. Urdu (1.03%)
7. Others (1.26%)

At the time of the 2011 Census of India, 82.22% of the population in the district spoke Marathi, 9.84% Varli, 2.09% Kukna, and 1.51% Hindi and 1.03% Urdu as their first language. 2.05% of the population spoke 'Others' under Marathi.
