= Talasari taluka =

Talasari taluka is a taluka in Palghar district of Maharashtra an Indian state.

On 1 August 2014, the talukas of Mokhada, Jawahar, Talasari, Vikramgadh, Wada, Dahanu, Palghar and Vasai were separated from the erstwhile Thane district to form a new district Palghar.

== Demographics ==
Religions in Talasari taluk (2011)
Religion	Percent
Hinduism	96.85%
Islam	1.44%
Christianity	0.86%
Other or not stated	0.85%

Talasari taluka has a population of 154,818 according to the 2011 census. Talasari had a literacy rate of 57.20% and a sex ratio of 1026 females per 1000 males. 26,733 (17.27%) are under 7 years of age. The entire population lived in rural areas. Scheduled Castes and Scheduled Tribes make up 1.32% and 90.61% of the population respectively.

Languages of Talasari taluk (2011)
1. Varli (67.27%)
2. Marathi (18.96%)
3. Kokna (4.95%)
4. Gujarati (3.89%)
5. Others (4.93%)

At the time of the 2011 Census of India, 67.27% of the population in the district spoke Varli, 18.96% Marathi, 4.95% Kokna and 3.89% Gujarati as their first language.
