= Varli language =

Indo-Aryan language spoken in India

Varali
- वारली, વારળી
- Native to: India
- Region: Maharashtra, Gujarat
- Ethnicity: Warli
- Native speakers: 390,000 (2011 census)
- Language family: Indo-European: Indo-Iranian; Indo-Aryan; Southern Zone; Marathi–Konkani; Varali
- Writing system: Devanagari, Gujarati

Language codes
- ISO 639-3: vav
- Glottolog: varl1238

Varali, also written Warali, Warli and Varli, is an Indo-Aryan language spoken by the Warli people. The language is usually classified as Marathi, but sometimes as Konkani or Bhil.
