= Dahanu taluka =

Taluka in Palghar district of Maharashtra, India

Dahanu taluka is a taluka in Palghar district of Maharashtra an Indian state.

== Thane district ==
On 1 August 2014, the talukas of Mokhada, Jawahar, Talasari, Vikramgadh, Wada, Dahanu, Palghar and Vasai were separated from the erstwhile Thane district to form a new district Palghar.

== Demographics ==
Religions in Dahanu taluk (2011)
Religion	Percent
Hinduism	95.37%
Islam	2.94%
Jainism	0.69%
Other or not stated	1.00%

Dahanu taluka has a population of 402,095 according to the 2011 census. Dahanu had a literacy rate of 60.19% and a sex ratio of 1015 females per 1000 males. 60,433 (15.03%) are under 7 years of age. 63,933 (15.90%) lived in urban areas. Scheduled Castes and Scheduled Tribes make up 1.62% and 69.11% of the population respectively.

Languages of Dahanu taluk (2011)
1. Marathi (65.84%)
2. Varli (17.79%)
3. Gujarati (7.87%)
4. Hindi (4.45%)
5. Others (4.05%)

At the time of the 2011 Census of India, 65.84% of the population in the district spoke Marathi, 17.79% Varli, 7.87% Gujarati and 4.45% Hindi as their first language.
