= Vikramgad taluka =

Vikramgad taluka is a taluka in Palghar district of Maharashtra an Indian state.

On 1 August 2014, the talukas of Mokhada, Jawahar, Talasari, Vikramgad, Wada, Dahanu, Palghar and Vasai were separated from the erstwhile Thane district to form a new district Palghar.

== Demographics ==
Religions in Vikramgad taluk (2011)
Religion	Percent
Hinduism	99.26%
Islam	0.44%
Other or not stated	0.30%

Vikramgad taluka has a population of 137,625 according to the 2011 census. Vikramgad had a literacy rate of 63.78% and a sex ratio of 1009 females per 1000 males. 21,962 (15.96%) are under 7 years of age. 5,991 (4.35%) lived in urban areas. Scheduled Castes and Scheduled Tribes make up 0.25% and 91.82% of the population respectively.

Languages of Vikramgad taluk (2011)
1. Marathi (95.47%)
2. Varli (3.09%)
3. Others (1.44%)

At the time of the 2011 Census of India, 95.47% of the population in the district spoke Marathi and 3.09% Varli as their first language.
