= Mokhada taluka =

Coordinates: 19.9333°N 73.3333°E

Mokhada taluka is a taluka in Palghar district of Maharashtra an Indian state.

== Thane district ==
On 1 August 2014, the talukas of Mokhada, Jawahar, Talasari, Vikramgad, Wada, Dahanu, Palghar and Vasai were separated from the erstwhile Thane district to form a new district Palghar.

== Demographics ==
Religions in Mokhada taluk (2011)
Religion	Percent
Hinduism	96.85%
Islam	1.80%
Buddhism	1.14%
Other or not stated	0.21%

Mokhada taluka has a population of 83,453 according to the 2011 census. Mokhada had a literacy rate of 56.48% and a sex ratio of 1002 females per 1000 males. 14,678 (17.59%) are under 7 years of age. The entire population lived in rural areas. Scheduled Castes and Scheduled Tribes make up 1.94% and 92.08% of the population respectively.

Languages of Mokhada taluk (2011)
1. Marathi (97.05%)
2. Hindi (2.06%)
3. Others (0.89%)

At the time of the 2011 Census of India, 97.05% of the population in the district spoke Marathi and 2.06% Hindi as their first language.
