= Palghar taluka =

Palghar taluka is a taluka in Palghar district of Maharashtra an Indian state.

== Thane district ==
On 1 August 2014, the talukas of Mokhada, Jawahar, Talasari, Vikramgadh, Wada, Dahanu, Palghar and Vasai were separated from the erstwhile Thane district to form a new district Palghar. Mr. Maheyssh Sagar is current Tahsildar & Executive Magistrate of Taluka Palghar. Mr. Vikas M. Gajare is current Sub Divisional Officer & Sub Divisional Magistrate of Palghar Sub Division.

== Demographics ==
Religions in Palghar taluk (2011)
Religion	Percent
Hinduism	90.62%
Islam	6.05%
Buddhism	1.31%
Jainism	0.80%
Christianity	0.50%
Other or not stated	0.72%

Palghar taluka has a population of 550,166 according to the 2011 census. Palghar had a literacy rate of 80.69% and a sex ratio of 907 females per 1000 males. 69,554 (12.64%) are under 7 years of age. 225,380 (40.97%) lived in urban areas. Scheduled Castes and Scheduled Tribes make up 3.09% and 30.56% of the population respectively.

Languages of Palghar taluk (2011)
1. Marathi (70.91%)
2. Hindi (16.61%)
3. Gujarati (2.65%)
4. Urdu (2.29%)
5. Bhojpuri (2.1%)
6. Marwari (1.08%)
7. Others (4.36%)

At the time of the 2011 Census of India, 70.91% of the population in the district spoke Marathi, 16.61% Hindi, 2.65% Gujarati, 2.29% Urdu, 2.10% Bhojpuri and 1.08% Marwari as their first language.
