= Vasai taluka =

Vasai taluka is a taluka in Palghar district of Maharashtra an Indian state.

== Palghar district ==
On 1 August 2014, the talukas of Mokhada, Jawahar, Talasari, Vikramgadh, Wada, Dahanu, Palghar and Vasai were separated from the erstwhile Thane district to form a new district Palghar.

== Demographics ==
Religions in Vasai taluk (2011)
Religion	Percent
Hinduism	78.05%
Islam	8.45%
Christianity	8.25%
Buddhism	2.53%
Jainism	1.75%
Other or not stated	0.59%

Vasai taluka has a population of 1,343,402 according to the 2011 census. Vasai had a literacy rate of 87.56% and a sex ratio of 893 females per 1000 males. 162,841 (12.12%) are under 7 years of age. 1,230,140 (91.57%) lived in urban areas. Scheduled Castes and Scheduled Tribes make up 3.98% and 7.32% of the population respectively.

Languages of Vasai taluk (2011)
1. Marathi (50.0%)
2. Hindi (24.8%)
3. Gujarati (8.60%)
4. Bhojpuri (2.92%)
5. Urdu (2.52%)
6. Marwari (1.64%)
7. Malayalam (1.41%)
8. Bengali (1.28%)
9. Konkani (1.25%)
10. Kannada (0.93%)
11. Others (4.70%)

At the time of the 2011 Census of India, 49.97% of the population in the district spoke Marathi, 24.78% Hindi, 8.60% Gujarati, 2.92% Bhojpuri, 2.52% Urdu, 1.64% Marwari, 1.41% Malayalam, 1.28% Bengali, 1.25% Konkani and 0.93% Kannada as their first language.
