= Wada taluka =

Wada taluka is a taluka in the Palghar district of Maharashtra.

== Palghar district ==
On 1 August 2014, the talukas of Mokhada, Jawahar, Talasari, Vikramgad, Wada, Dahanu, Palghar and Vasai were separated from the erstwhile Thane district to form a new district Palghar.

== Demographics ==
Religions in Vada taluk (2011)
| Religion | Percent |
| Hinduism | 95.11% |
| Islam | 3.27% |
| Buddhism | 1.23% |
| Other or not stated | 0.39% |

Vada taluka has a population of 178,370 according to the 2011 census. Vada had a literacy rate of 73.02% and a sex ratio of 939 females per 1000 males. 24,120 (13.52%) are under 7 years of age. 23,954 (13.43%) lived in urban areas. Scheduled Castes and Scheduled Tribes make up 2.51% and 57.02% of the population respectively.

Languages of Vada taluk (2011)
1. Marathi (91.35%)
2. Hindi (4.97%)
3. Urdu (1.92%)
4. Others (1.76%)

At the time of the 2011 Census of India, 91.35% of the population in the district spoke Marathi, 4.97% Hindi and 1.92% Urdu as their first language.
