= Thane district =

District in Maharashtra, India

- District of Maharashtra
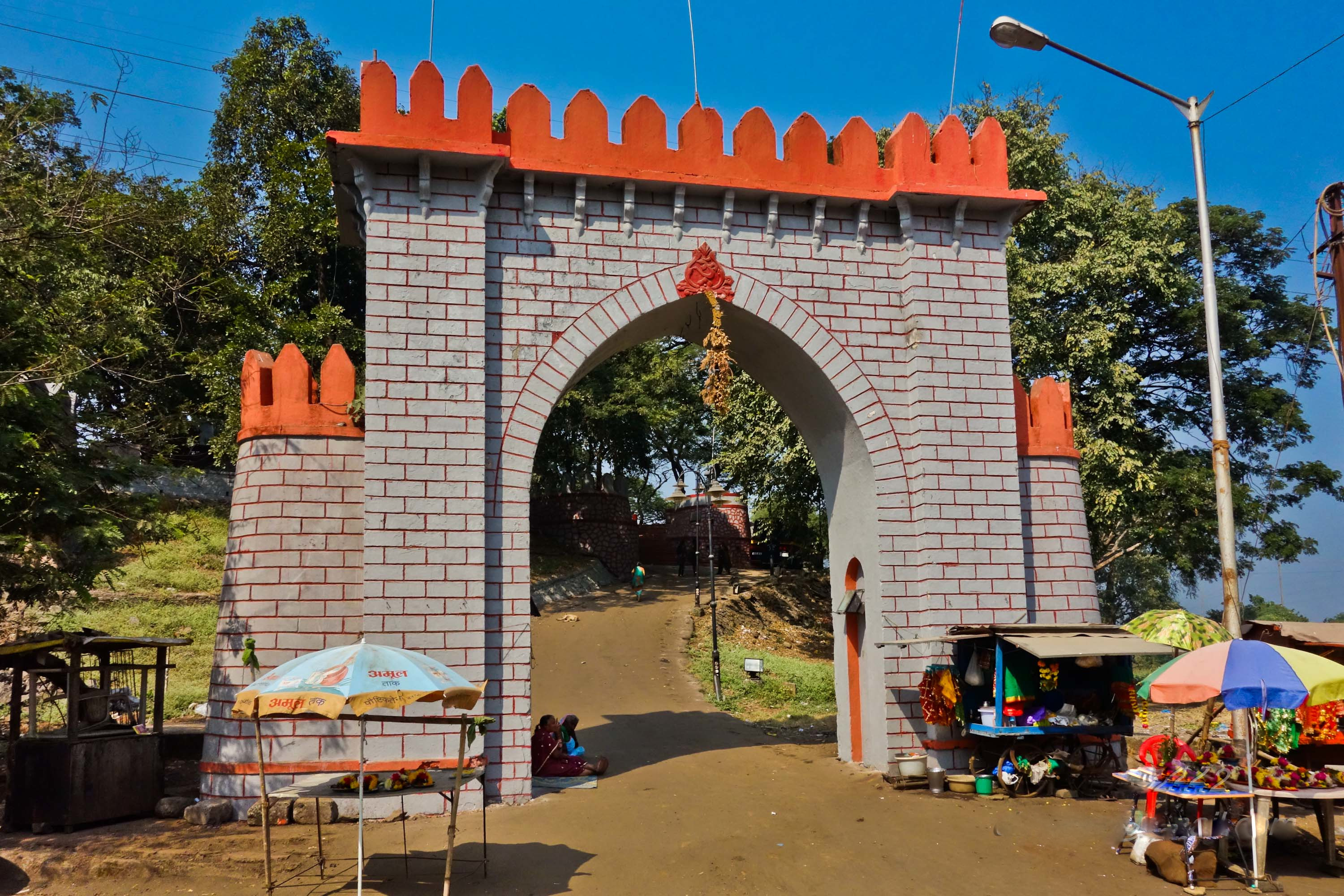
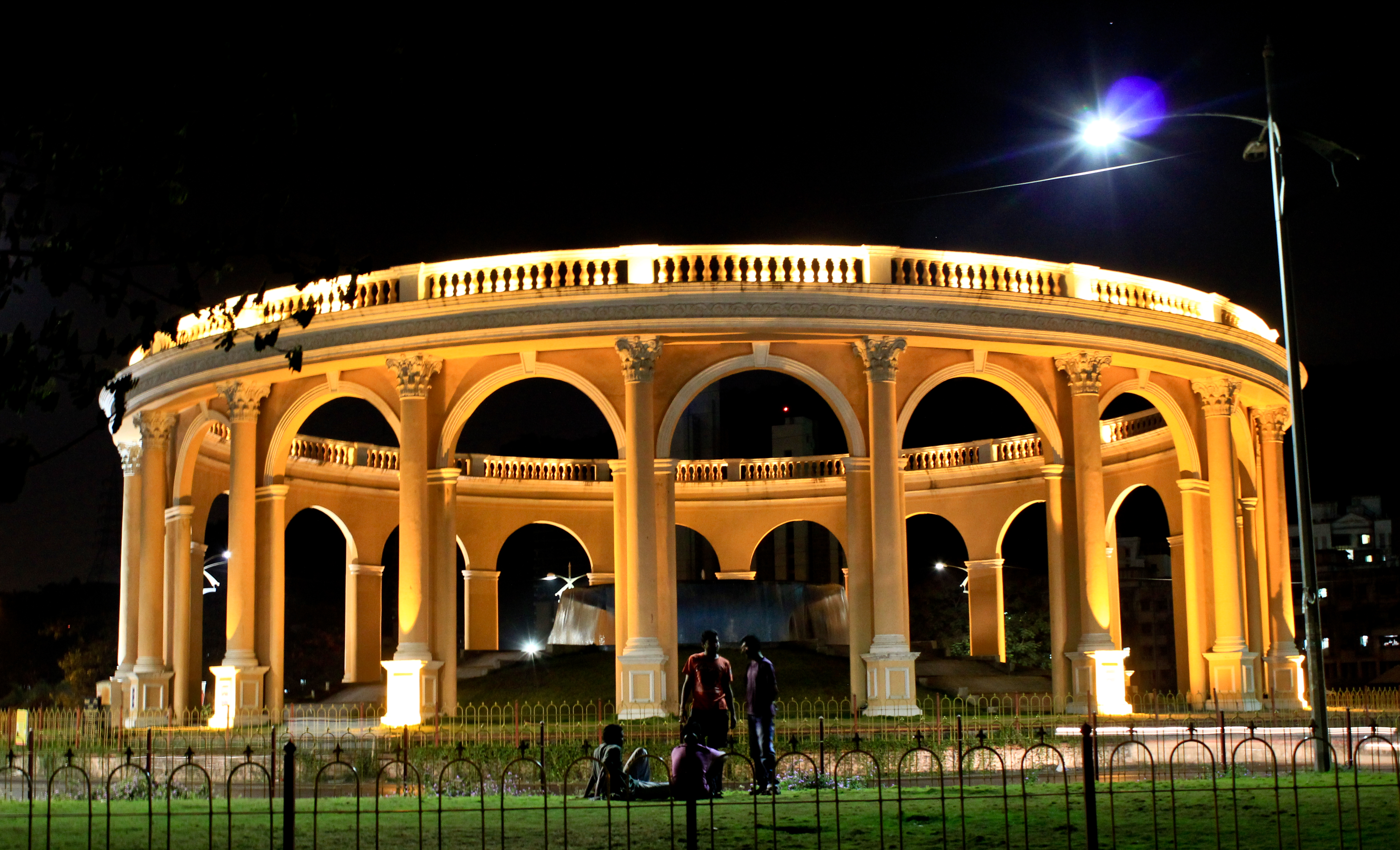
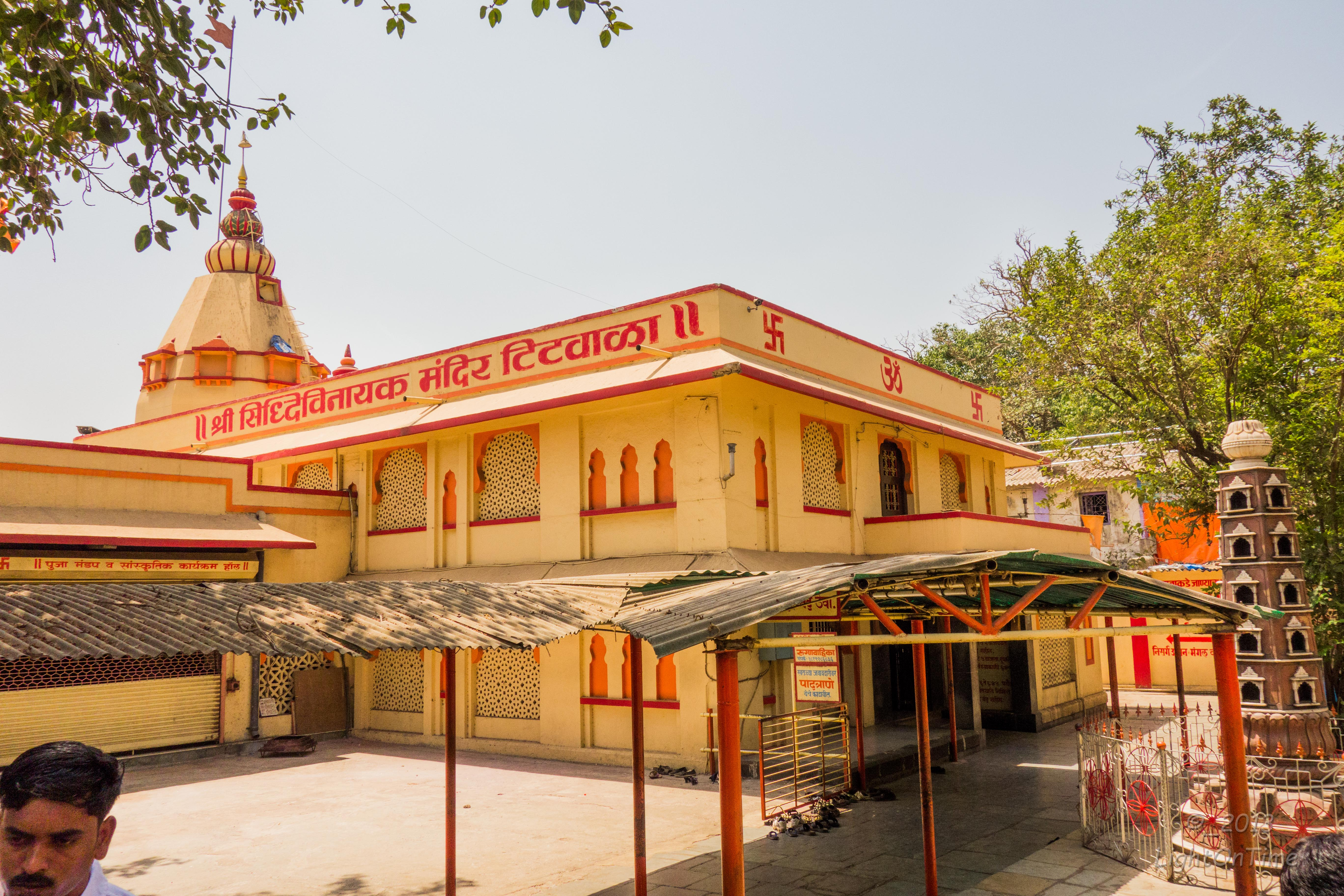
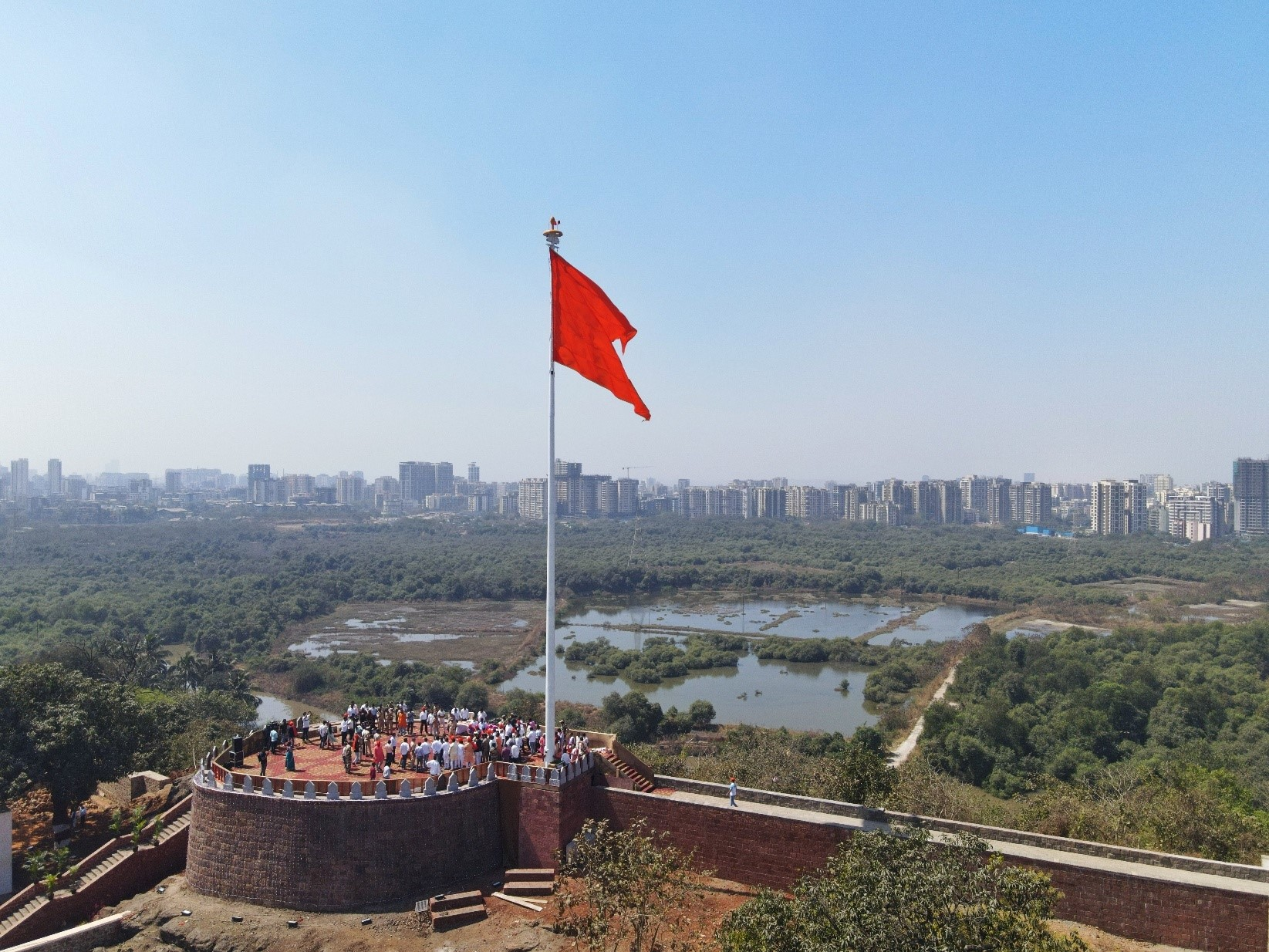
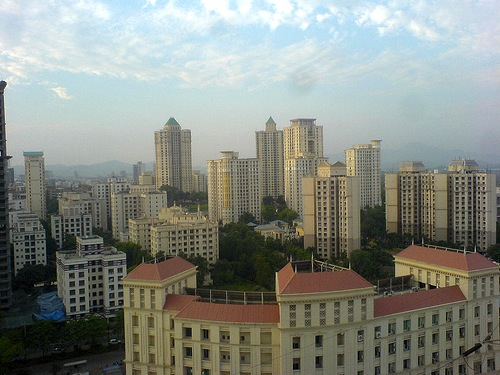
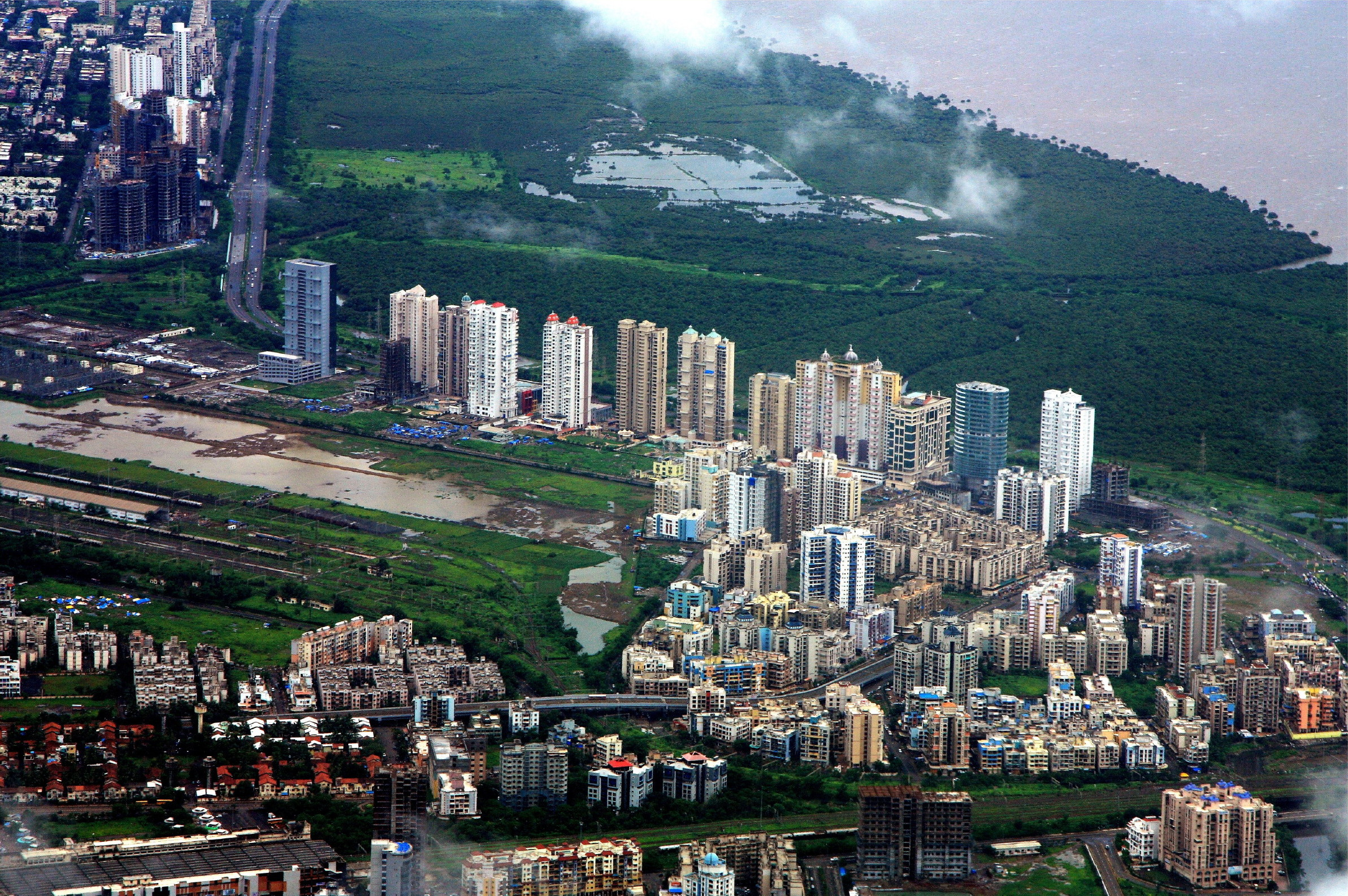
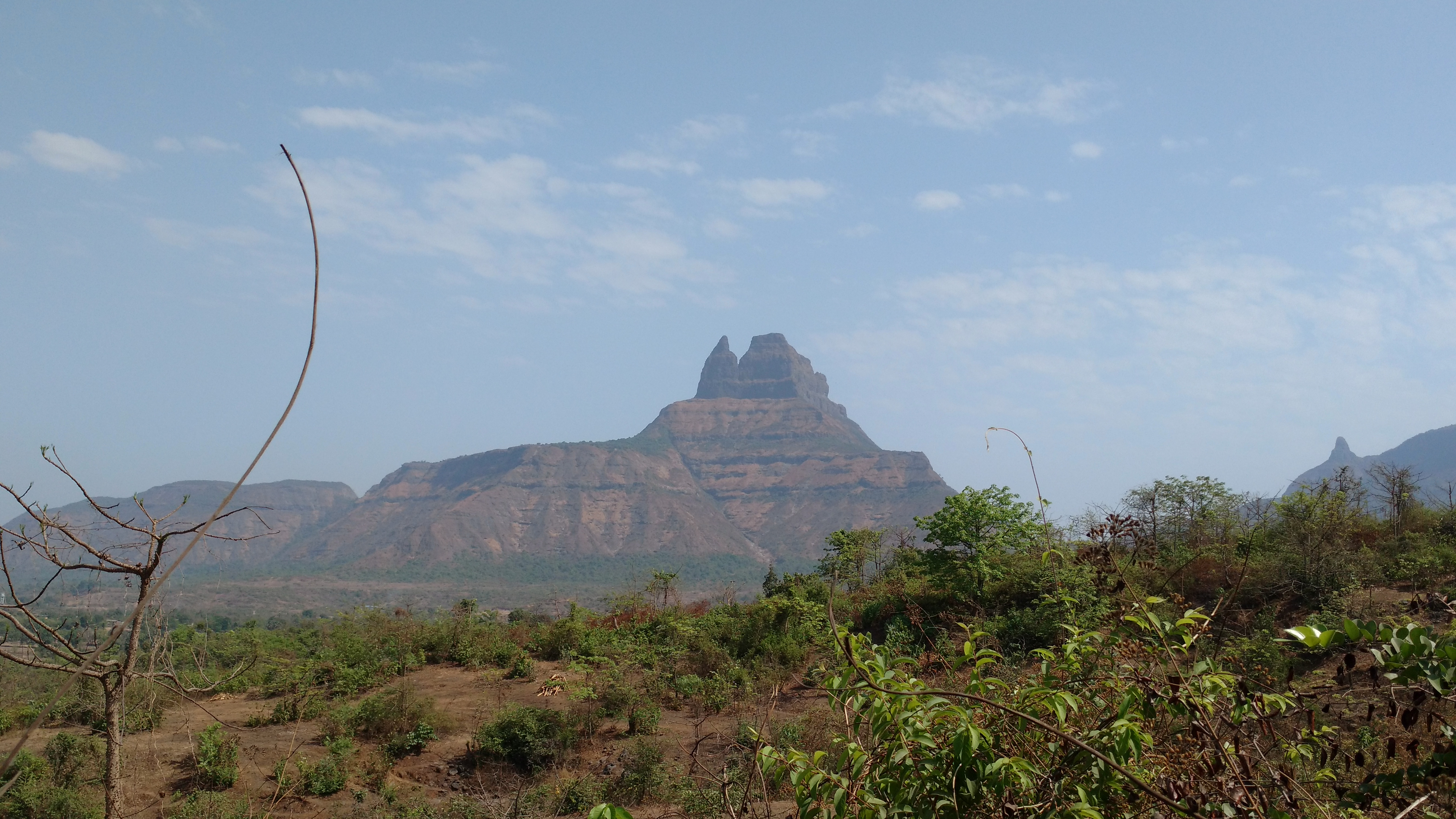
- First row: Thane Creek Flamingo Sanctuary Second row (Left to right): Durgadi Fort in Kalyan-Dombivli; Utsav Chowk in Navi Mumbai Third row (Left to right): Temple in Titwala; Sanjay Gandhi National Park in Thane Fourth row (Left to right): Ghodbunder Fort in Mira-Bhayander; Hiranandani Estate in Thane Fifth row (Left to right): Uttan Beach near Mira-Bhayander; Palm Beach Road, Navi Mumbai Sixth row: Malang Fort near Kalyan-Dombivli

- Location in Maharashtra
- Coordinates: 19.2°N 72.97°E
- Country: India
- State: Maharashtra
- Division: Konkan
- District Headquarters: Thane

Government
  - Body: Thane Zilla Parishad
  - Guardian minister: Eknath Shinde (Deputy Chief Minister)
  - President Z. P. Thane: Pushpa Borhade-Patil
  - District collector: Ashok Shingare (IAS)
  - CEO Z. P. Thane: Manuj Jindal
  - MPs: Naresh Mhaske (Thane) Shrikant Shinde (Kalyan) Suresh Mhatre (Bhiwandi)

Area
  - Total: 4,214 km^{2} (1,627 sq mi)
- Elevation: 11 m (36 ft)

Population (2011)
  - Total: 11,060,148
  - Density: 2,625/km^{2} (6,798/sq mi)
- Demonym: Thanekar

Language
  - Official: Marathi

GDP (Nominal, 2025)
  - Total: ₹6.73 trillion (US$69.63 billion)
  - Per capita: ₹444,283 (US$4,599.82)
- Time zone: UTC+5:30 (IST)
- PIN CODE: 40xxxx
- Vehicle registration: MH-04, MH-05, MH-43, MH-58
- Website: thane.nic.in

Thane district (Pronunciation: [ʈʰaːɳe], previously named Taana or Thana) is a district in the Konkan division of the Indian state of Maharashtra. At the 2011 Census, it was the most populated district in the country, with 11,060,148 inhabitants; however, in August 2014, the district was split into two with the creation of a new Palghar district, leaving the reduced Thane district with a 2011 census population of 8,070,032. The headquarters of the district is the city of Thane.Thane district is located in western Maharashtra.Other major cities in the district are Navi Mumbai, Kalyan-Dombivli, Mira-Bhayander, Bhiwandi, Ulhasnagar, Ambarnath, Badlapur, Murbad and Shahapur.

The district is situated between 18°42' and 20°20' north latitudes and 72°45' and 73°48' east longitudes. The revised area of the district is 4,214 km^{2}. The district is bounded by Nashik district to the north east, Pune and Ahmednagar districts to the east, and by Palghar district to the north. The Arabian Sea forms the western boundary, while it is bounded by Mumbai Suburban district to the south west, and Raigad District to the south.

== Officer ==
=== Members of Parliament ===
- Naresh Mhaske (SHS)
  (Thane)
- Shrikant Shinde (SHS)
  (Kalyan)
- Suresh Mhatre (NCP(SP))
  (Bhiwandi)

=== Guardian Minister ===
Guardian Minister Thane
- पालकमंत्री ठाणे
- Emblem of India
- Incumbent; Eknath Shinde since 18 January 2025
- Style: The Honourable
- Residence: Thane
- Appointer: Chief Minister of Maharashtra
- Term length: 5 years / N o time limit
- Website: thane.gov.in/en/

==== list of Guardian Minister ====
Name	Term of office
Varsha Gaikwad	11 November 2010 - 26 September 2014
Eknath Shinde	5 December 2014 - 8 November 2019
Eknath Shinde	9 January 2020 - 27 June 2022
Subhash Desai Additional Charge	27 June 2022 - 29 June 2022
Shambhuraj Desai	24 September 2022- 26 November 2024
Eknath Shinde	18 January 2025 - Incumbent

=== District Magistrate/Collector ===
District Magistrate / Collector Thane
- जिल्हाधिकारी तथा जिल्हादंडाधिकारी ठाणे
- Emblem of India
- Incumbent; Mr. Shrikrishna B. Panchal (IAS) since July 2025
- Residence: At Thane district
- Appointer: Government of Maharashtra
- Term length: No time limit
- Website: thane.gov.in/en/

==== list of District Magistrate / Collector ====
Name	Term of office
Dr.Shrikrishna B. Panchal (IAS)	July 2025 - Incumbent

== History ==
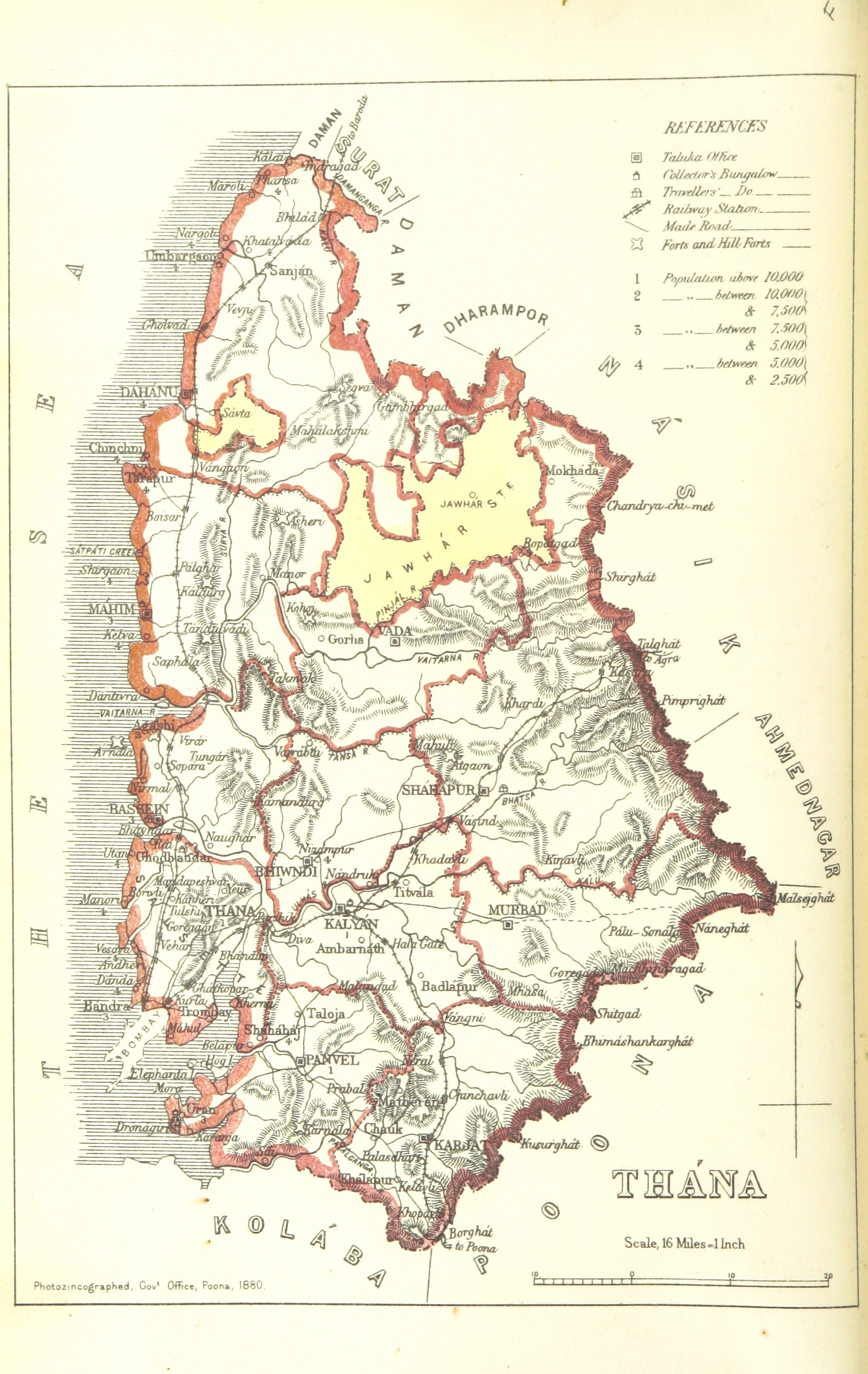
Thana district 1896

In 1817, the territory now comprising Thane district was taken over by the British from the Peshwa and it became a part of North Konkan district, with its headquarters in Thana. Since then, it has undergone considerable changes in its boundaries. In 1830, the North Konkan district was expanded by adding parts of South Konkan district and in 1833 was renamed Thane District. In 1853, the three sub-divisions of Pen, Roha and Mahad together with Underi and Revadanda agencies of Kolaba were formed into the sub-collectorate of Kolaba, under Thana, and ultimately were separated to become an independent Kolaba district in 1869 (now known as Raigad district).

Back in 1866, the administrative sub-divisions of Thane were reorganised and renamed: Sanjan as Dahanu, Kolvan as Shahapur and Nasrapur as Karjat. Vada petha was upgraded to the level of a taluka. Uran Mahal was separated from Salsette in 1861 and was placed under Panvel. Panvel, together with its mahals of Uran and Karanja, was transferred to Kolaba district in 1883 and Karjat was transferred in 1891. A new mahal with Bandra as headquarters was created in 1917 and in 1920 Salsette was divided into two talukas — North Salsette and South Salsette. South Salsette consisting of 84 villages was separated from Thana District and included in the newly created Bombay Suburban district (present Mumbai Suburban district). North Salsette was made a mahal under Kalyan taluka in 1923 and renamed as Thane in 1926. Kelve-Mahim was renamed as Palghar. 33 villages of the Bombay Suburban district were transferred to Thana district in 1945 and 14 of them were re-transferred to the Bombay Suburban district in 1946 when the Aarey Forest was constituted.

After Independence, in 1949, the Koli princely state of Jawhar was merged with Thana district and became a separate taluka. As many as twenty-seven villages and eight towns from Borivali taluka and one town and one village from Thana taluka were transferred to the Bombay Suburban district in 1956 when the limits of Greater Bombay were extended northwards in Salsette. In 1960, following the bifurcation of the bilingual Bombay State, 47 villages, and three towns in the taluka of Umbargaon were transferred to Surat district in Gujarat and its remaining twenty-seven villages were first included in Dahanu and later in 1961 made into a separate mahal, Talasari. In 1969, the taluka of Kalyan was divided into two talukas, Kalyan and Ulhasnagar.

== Geography ==
The district is the northernmost part of the Konkan lowlands of Maharashtra. It comprises the wide amphitheatre like Ulhas basin on the south and hilly Vaitarna valley on the north together with plateaus and the slopes of Sahyadri. From the steep slopes of the Sahyadri in the east, the land falls through a succession of plateaus in the north and centre of the district to the Ulhas valley in the south. These lowlands are separated from the coast by a fairly well-defined narrow ridge of hills that runs north–south to the east of the Thane creek, parallel to the sea, keeping a distance of about 6 to 10 km from the shores. Isolated hills and spurs dot the district area.

=== Rivers and hot springs ===
The two main rivers flowing through the district are the Ulhas and the Vaitarna. The Ulhas originates from the north of Tungarli near Lonavala, flows for a short distance before descending near Bor ghat, and meets the sea at Vasai Creek. The Ulhas River is 135 km long. The river has many tributaries; the two most important of them (within the boundaries of this district) are the Barvi and the Bhatsa. The Vaitarna, the largest of the Konkan rivers, rises in the Tryambak Hills in Nashik district, opposite to the source of the Godavari. The river flows across Shahapur, wada and Palghar talukas and enter the Arabian Sea through a wide estuary off Arnala. The Vaitarna River is 154 km long and has a drainage area that practically covers the entire northern part of the district. It has a number of tributaries; the most important of them are the Pinjal, Surya, Daherja and Tansa.

Many small creeks are found all along the western coast, in which tidal waters flood upstream and fill up much low ground. In many cases human interference has helped in converting them into mud flats. The bigger creeks are Bhiwandi, Chinchani, and Dahanu Creeks. The Thane Creek is not a creek in the true sense, but a depression engulfed by the sea.

The northern part of the Salsette Island is part of Thane District, which is separated from the mainland by the Ulhas estuary and the Thane Creek but is connected through reclaimed land with the island city of Mumbai. Arnala Island is located in Vasai taluka, at the entrance to the Vaitarna estuary.

The district has no natural lakes. Artificial lakes have been constructed mainly to supply drinking water to Mumbai. The Tansa Lake formed across the Tansa River in the hills north of Bhiwandi behind the dam completed in 1892 CE. The Modak Sagar (Lower Vaitarna) Lake on the river Vaitarna formed behind a dam completed in 1957 CE. In the upper reaches of the same river, the Upper Vaitarana Lake formed behind another dam built in 1972 CE. The Bhatsa Lake has been formed in the upper Bhatsa, north of Shahapur behind a dam built in 1981 CE. Tourism Nature lovers proudly call Thane as a “Lake City” or "city of lakes".

They are near Akloli, Ganeshpuri and Vajreshwari villages. There are some more examples: Kokner (Maswan tal-Palghar) and Sativali (Saphale tal:-Palghar). The water temperatures are in the range of 42°-55 °C.

=== Climate ===
The district has four seasons. Winter is from December to February, followed by summer from March to June. The southwest monsoon season is from June to September. October and November months constitute the post-monsoon season, which is hot and humid in the coastal areas.

In the coastal area, the average daily maximum temperature in summer is 32.9 °C (maximum recorded at Dahanu is 40.6 °C on 19 April 1955) and in winter average mean daily minimum temperature is 16.8 °C (minimum recorded at Dahanu is 8.3 °C on 8 January 1945). But in the interior parts of the district, the average daily minimum temperature is slightly lower in the winter season and the average daily maximum temperature is higher in the summer.

The average annual rainfall in the district is 2293.4 mm. The rainfall in the district increases from the coastal areas to the interior. The rainfall varies from 1730.5 mm at Mahim on the coast to 2588.7 mm at Shahapur in the interior. The rainfall during the southwest monsoon season, June to September, constitutes about 94% of the annual rainfall. July is the wettest month with a rainfall of about 40% of the annual total. The variation in the annual rainfall from year to year in the district is not large. The highest rainfall recorded in 24 hours at any station in the district was 481.1 mm at Dahanu on 1 September 1958 CE.

== Divisions ==
Thane district comprises 7 talukas (administrative divisions), with Thane being its headquarters. The talukas, with their populations at the 2001 and 2011 Censuses are as follows

=== List of Talukas ===
Taluka	Population Census 2001	Population Census 2011
Thane taluka	2,486,941	3,787,036
Kalyan taluka	1,276,614	1,565,417
Ambarnath taluka	366,501	565,340
Murbad taluka	170,267	190,652
Bhiwandi taluka	945,582	1,141,386
Shahapur taluka	273,304	314,103
Ulhasnagar taluka	473,731	506,098
Totals	5,992,940	8,070,032

=== Talukas and Sub-Divisions ===
1. Thane Sub-Division: Thane taluka,
2. Kalyan Sub-Division: Kalyan taluka, Murbad taluka
3. Ulhasnagar Sub-Division: Ulhasnagar taluka, Ambarnath taluka
4. Bhiwandi Sub-Division: Bhiwandi taluka, Shahapur taluka

=== Municipal Civic Bodies ===
Municipal Corporations:

1. Thane Municipal Corporation
2. Mira-Bhayandar Municipal Corporation
3. Navi Mumbai Municipal Corporation
4. Kalyan-Dombivali Municipal Corporation
5. Ulhasnagar Municipal Corporation
6. Bhiwandi-Nizampur Municipal Corporation

Municipal Councils:

1. Ambernath
2. Kulgaon-Badlapur

Nagar Panchayats:

1. Shahapur
2. Murbad

Proposed Municipal Corporations:

1. Ambernath-Badlapur Municipal Corporation
2. Thackerey Nagar Municipal Corporation (comprising 38 villages that includes - 14 NMMC Trans-Parsik Hills villages in Thane taluka, 11 villages from Kalyan taluka and 13 villages from Ambernath taluka. 14 villages of NMMC: Dahisar Mori, Mokashi, Valivali, Pimpri, Nighu, Navali, Waklan, Bhandarli, Narivali, Bale, Nagaon, Uttarshiv, Goteghar, Bamali; 11 villages of Kalyan taluka: Nilaje, Ghesar, Kole, Hedutane, Davdi, Shirdon, Vadavali Khurd, Vadavali Budruk, Khoni, Antarli, Dhamtan; 13 villages of Ambernath taluka: Umbroli, Bhal, Adivali Dhokali, Dwarli, Vasar, Manere, Asode, Burdul, Usatane, Narhen, Pali, Chirad, Karvale Khurd)

Proposed Municipal Councils:

1. Shahapur-Asangaon (merging the Census Towns of Shahapur, Goteghar and Asangaon)
2. Murbad (merging Murbad Census Town and villages of Malinagar, Ghutyachiwadi, Deogaon, Deope, Shastrinagar)

Proposed Nagar Panchayats:

1. Vangani {merging Vangani and Done}
2. Rayate {merging Rayate, Pimpaloli, Goveli and Vaholi}
3. Khadavli {merging Khadavli, Vaveghar and Ju}
4. Vasind {merging Vasind and Khativali}
5. Khardi {merging Khardi, Dalkhan, Ghanepada, Golbhan and Pimpalpada}
6. Kasara {merging Kasara and Mokhavane}
7. Vajreshwari {merging Vajreshwari, Ganeshpuri, Bhiwali, Usgaon and Akaloli}
8. Padgha {merging Padgha, Borivali Tarf Rahur, Arjunali and Sherekarpada}
9. Kharbav {merging Kharbav, Bangalapada and Malodi}
10. Mahapoli {merging Mahapoli and Nandithane

=== Loksabha and Assembly Constituencies ===
There are 18 Vidhan Sabha constituencies in Thane district, grouped into 3 Lok Sabha constituencies:

- Bhiwandi Rural (ST), Shahapur (ST), Bhiwandi West, Bhiwandi East, Kalyan West and Murbad constituencies are part of Bhiwandi Lok Sabha constituency.
- Ambarnath (SC), Ulhasnagar, Kalyan East, Dombivali, Kalyan Rural and Mumbra-Kalwa constituencies are part of Kalyan Lok Sabha constituency.
- Mira Bhayandar, Ovala-Majiwada, Kopri-Pachpakhadi, Thane, Belapur and Airoli constituencies are part of Thane Lok Sabha constituency.

For a number of years up until 2013, it was proposed that the Thane district be divided and a separate Jawhar District carved out of the existing Thane district with the inclusion of the northern tribal talukas of Thane district which include Palghar, Vada, Vikramgad, Jawhar, Mokhada, Dahanu and Talasari talukas in the proposed Jawhar district. The last Princely Ruler of Jawhar State at Indian independence was His Highness Maharaja Patangshah V (Yashwantrao Martandrao) Mukne. Jawhar was the cultural capital of this rural part of Thane District which was previously known as Jawhar State ruled by Kolis. However, in June 2014, the Maharashtra State government decided to add an eighth taluka Vasai, which was previously part of Thane district to the other seven talukas, and decided that the new District would be headquartered in Palghar. In June 2014, the State Cabinet approved the bifurcation of the district into two districts - Thane and Palghar. The new Palghar district comprises the seven talukas which it had been proposed to comprise in the putative Jawhar District, with the addition of Vasai taluka. The effective date for bifurcation was 1 August 2014.

== Demographics ==
Historical population
Year	Pop.	±% p.a.
1901	665,326	—
1911	721,323	+0.81%
1921	713,228	−0.11%
1931	787,664	+1.00%
1941	882,321	+1.14%
1951	1,282,572	+3.81%
1961	1,652,678	+2.57%
1971	2,281,664	+3.28%
1981	3,351,562	+3.92%
1991	5,249,126	+4.59%
2001	8,131,849	+4.47%
2011	11,060,148	+3.12%

According to the 2011 census Thane district had a population of 11,060,148, roughly equal to the nation of Cuba or the US state of Ohio. This gave it a ranking of 1st in India (out of a total of 640) and 1st in its state. The district had a population density of 1,157 inhabitants per square kilometre (3,000/sq mi) . Its population growth rate over the decade 2001-2011 was 35.94%. It had a sex ratio of 880 females for every 1000 males, and a literacy rate of 86.18%. In the divided district Scheduled Castes and Scheduled Tribes are 7.97% and 5.26% of the population respectively.

Religions in Thane district (2011)
Religion	Percent
Hinduism	75.75%
Islam	14.66%
Buddhism	4.99%
Christianity	2.04%
Jainism	1.75%
Other or not stated	0.81%

=== Language ===
Languages of Thane district (2011)
1. Marathi 52.78 (50.7%)
2. Hindi 19.65 (18.9%)
3. Urdu 9.86 (9.48%)
4. Gujarati 4.27 (4.11%)
5. Sindhi 2.81 (2.70%)
6. Bhojpuri 2.15 (2.07%)
7. Telugu 1.6 (1.54%)
8. Marwadi 1.57 (1.51%)
9. Malayalam 1.5 (1.44%)
10. Kannada 1.43 (1.37%)
11. Tamil 1.2 (1.15%)
12. Bengali 1.17 (1.12%)
13. Others 4.01 (3.86%)

At the time of the 2011 Census of India in the residual district, 49.78% of the population in the district spoke Marathi, 18.65% Hindi, 9.86% Urdu, 4.27% Gujarati, 2.81% Sindhi, 2.15% Bhojpuri, 1.60% Telugu, 1.57% Marwari, 1.50% Malayalam, 1.43% Kannada, 1.20% Tamil and 1.17% Bengali as their first language.

It had a population of 8,131,849 of which 72.58% were urban as of 2001. Total literacy rate of the district is 80.67% (male 87.06% and female 73.10%). The population of Thane district in 2011 had risen to 11,054,131; this is close to 10 percent (9.84) of Maharashtra's estimated population of 112.4 million and 1% of India's total population. It was the most populated district in the country, somewhat ahead of North 24 Parganas district in West Bengal which had 10,082,852 people. The density of population was estimated at 1,157 people per square kilometre. The sex ratio i.e. number of females per 1000 male was 880 which is less than the states average of 925 and the national average of 940. The creation of the new Palghar district from the northern and western talukas has now reduced the population of Thane District to some 8,070,032 inhabitants as at the 2011 Census.

The southern talukas are mainly urban areas. Marathi is the dominant language in rural areas such as Shahapur and Murbad, while urban areas are a mixture of languages from all over India with Marathi and Hindi the main ones.

== Economy ==
According to the 2001 Census, the total working population in the district was 11,961,704 persons, which is 47.37% of the total population of the district. Out of total working force, 51.75% were engaged in agriculture and allied activities, 6.19% in manufacturing, service and cottage industries and remaining 30.69% in other activities. Out of total working force, the female working force was 22.89% in the district.

=== Agriculture ===
The important kharif crops of the district are rice, vari and nachani (finger millet). The pulses like Urad, moong and kulith are also grown in this season. Rice is the main crop of the district. Rice is grown in all the talukas of the district but mainly in Palghar, Bhiwandi, Murbad, Shahapur, Vada, Vikramgad and Dahanu. Vari and nachani are grown in the hilly areas of the eastern part of the district, namely Jawhar, Murbad, Vikramgad, Shahapur and Mokhada talukas. Wal, chavali and gram are the main rabi crops grown in this district. Dahanu taluka is famous for fruits. Chikoos (sapotas) are grown on a large scale at Gholwad. Chikoo orchards are also found in Palghar and Talasari talukas. Chikoos grown in these areas are sent all over India. Other fruits grown in the district are guavas, mangoes, papayas, grapefruits and coconuts. Vasai and Palghar talukas are famous for different varieties of bananas such as rajeli, tambeli, mutheli and velchi. Seasonal fruits grown in the district such as bor, wild berries and litchis have great demands in the markets of Mumbai. Vegetables are also grown in the district. Among the vegetables, eggplants are grown on a large scale. There are rose gardens at Dahanu.

=== Industries ===
Thane is the third most industrialised district in the State. There are 1548 large and medium scale and 18,480 small scale industries in the district. The main products of these industries are Drugs, Textiles, Adhesives, Plastics, Rubber, Steel, Pharmaceuticals, Engineering, Fertilizers, Electronics, Chemicals and Iron & Steel. The Wagle Industrial. Estate, Thane-Belapur-Kalyan, Ambedkar industrial belt is the centre of highly sophisticated modern industries. In Ulhasnagar, Ambarnath, Bhiwandi, Badlapur, Tarapur, Palghar, Vasai and Murbad there are nearly 4000 industries which contribute towards the industrialisation of the district. Manufacture of machinery, machine tools and parts except electrical machinery together with the iron and steel industry and metal products are the most important and the biggest group of industries in the district and includes manufacture of Prime movers, Boilers, Refrigerators, Machine Tools, Computing and Accounting machinery, Industrial machinery for food and textile industries, machinery for chemicals, paper and cement industries. Manufacture of basic industrial chemicals including fertilizers, vegetable and animal oils and fats, paints, varnishes and lacquers and other miscellaneous chemical products is another important industry in the district. These industries are mainly concentrated in the Trans-Thane Creek and Belapur Road industrial area. The medium and large industries manufacturing chemicals and chemical products are Pfizer, Lubrizol India Ltd., Polyolefins Industries Ltd., NOCIL, Herdillia Chemicals Ltd., BASF (India) Ltd., Star Chemicals, INDOFIL INDUSTRIES LIMITED, and Phoenix Chemical Works. The chemical industries are also found in other parts of the district like Wagle Industrial Estate, Pokhran Road, Ambarnath and Dombivli. The cotton and non-cotton power looms are mainly located at Bhiwandi, Thane and Kalyan. Traditionally, Bhiwandi is famous for its handlooms. But the deteriorating markets for the handlooms compelled the weavers to replace their handlooms by powerlooms. Fisheries constitute an important industry in Thane district. It is carried out in sea as well as in creeks and estuaries on the western coast. Marine fishery predominates over inland fishery in the district and provides employment to about 75% of the persons engaged in the fishing industry. Fishing in sea is carried out along the coast stretching over about 110 km. The important fishing centres in the district are Dahanu, Pokharan-Uchheli, Nawapur, Murabe, Satpute, Datiware, Arnala, Vasai and Uran. Food processing industries like grain mill products, Bakery products, Cocoa, Chocolate and Sugar Confectionery, Salt, ice, slaughtering, preparation and preservation of meat, dairy products, canning and preservation of fruits and vegetables, canning, preserving and processing of fish are developed in the district. Raptakos, Brett and Co., Pfizer Ltd., Cadbury Fry (India) Ltd. which produce modified milk food and high protein food are some of the large and medium companies in the district. Wood products like plywood and veneer, wooden boxes, barrels, bamboo, cane baskets, bobbins, industrial fixtures, cork & cork products are also manufactured in the district. The Tarapur Atomic Power Station which has ushered an era of utilisation of nuclear energy for electricity generation is also situated in the district. The finance is being provided by various public sector and private sector Banks and Financial Institutions in the district. Bank of Maharashtra is one of the leading Public Sector Banks of the district, having 60 branches (2000 CE).

== Transport ==
Thane district is well connected to other major cities and town of the country by roadways and railways. MSRTC (Maharashtra State Road Transport Corporation) operates direct bus to various city like Pune, Nashik, Shirdi, Solapur, Kolhapur, Satara, Karad, Nagpur, Hyderabad etc. Private buses are operated to various cities like Mysuru, Bengaluru, Mangaluru, Hubli, Surat, Ahmedabad, Vadodara, Jaipur, Udaipur, Goa, Ratnagiri etc. Railway stations like Thane, Kalyan in the district provides connectivity to the major cities of country. The Thane Municipal Corporation started its own public transport service known as the Thane Municipal Transport (TMT) from 9 February 1989. The TMT has a fleet of 289 buses which ply on 45 routes from 2 bus-depots and 8 bus-stands ferrying approximately 2.8 lakhs commuters daily. In 2006, Navi Mumbai Municipal Corporation started its own transport service Navi Mumbai Municipal Transport (NMMT) on 23 January 1996 with fleet of 25 buses now having 256 buses and first hybrid bus in India. Mira Bhayandar Municipal Corporation commenced its own public transport service, known as the Mira-Bhayandar Municipal Transport (MBMT). The Kalyan-Dombivli Municipal Corporation also runs its own Kalyan-Dombivli Municipal Transport (KDMT), Ulhasnagar Municipal Corporation also runs Ulhasnagar Municipal Transport (UMT) service. Maharashtra State Road Transport Corporation (MSRTC) buses connect Thane city to different parts of the district and also to other districts. BEST provides services to Mumbai Suburban, Thane and Mira-Bhayandar.

The total railway track length in the district is 345.73 km. spread in western and central part of the district. The Western Railway network passes through Vasai, Palghar and Dahanu talukas of the district and Central railway network passes through Thane, Kalyan, Ulhasnagar and Shahapur talukas of the district. Western Railway local trains leaving from Churchgate railway station go up to Dahanu Road railway station in the district. Central Railway local trains leaving from Chhatrapati Shivaji Terminus go up to Kalyan, Ulhasnagar, Ambarnath, Badlapur, Karjat and Kasara. In 1994, a new connection made from Diva Junction to Vasai via Bhiwandi. This connection joined Central Railway and Western Railway networks and its length is 41.96 km. Konkan Railway network also passes through a part of the district. Local trains have now started plying from Chhatrapati Shivaji Terminus, Mumbai to Panvel on this network. Dahanu, Satpati, Mahim, Kalyan, Vasai, and Uttan are the ports on the Arabian Sea coast. Ferry services are available between these ports. Metered Auto Rickshaws ply in Thane, Mira-Bhayander and several other towns. Metered Taxi services are also available in Thane, Mira-Bhayandar and some other towns.

One of the oldest and important railway project of Ahmednagar railway station was kalyan-Ahmednagar railway project which was in planning stage since British regime. It was referred as 3rd ghat project. The survey of this project was carried out in 1973, 2000, 2006, 2014 etc. This project was in pink book in 2010. unfortunately this project could not be started. The alignment length of thus project was 184 km and it could have been shortest route for marathwada, andhra and Telangana. The major challenge for this project was malshej ghat section. Malshej Kriti samiti is following for kalyan ahmednagar railway project. Kalyan-murbad section which is first phase of this project is already under survey stage.

At present, this district has no airport. But plans are underway and proposals have been received to revive a disused airstrip for commercial operations near Kalyan.

== Sports ==
A significant stadium in this district, Dadoji Konddev Sports Stadium, is located in Thane city, where various sports like cricket, badminton, tennis and table tennis are played. Navi Mumbai city has good sporting infrastructure as DY Patil Stadium is located at Nerul.

== Villages ==
- Pundhe
- Taloli
- Asnoli
