= Hinduism in Maharashtra =

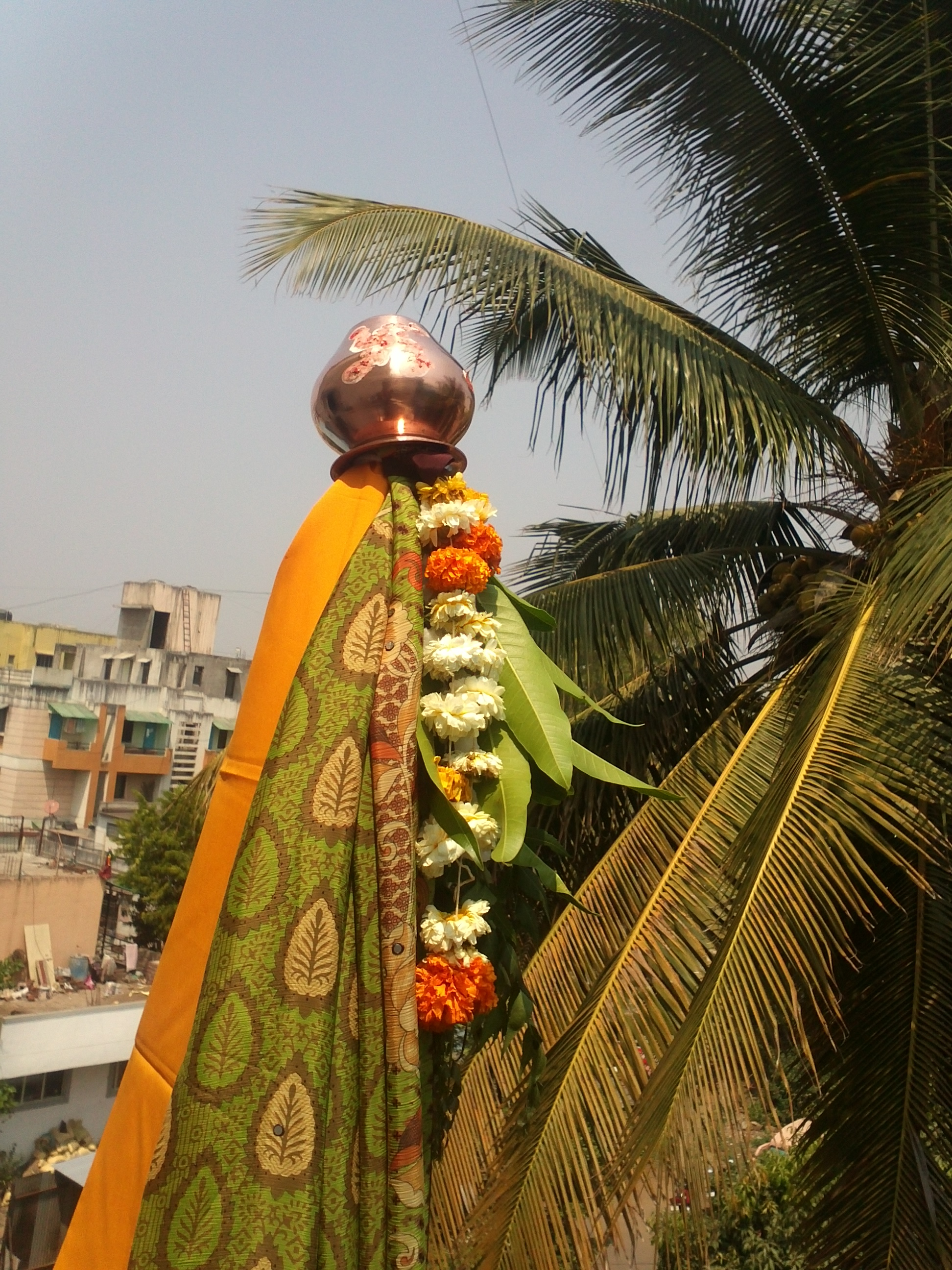
Traditional Gudhi erected for Gudhi Padwa, Marathi New Year

Hindus form 79.83% of the state's total population as per 2011 census. Hindus form the majority in all the districts of the state. The religion plays an important role in the lives of the Maharashtrian people in their day-to-day life. Vitthoba, along with other incarnations of Vishnu such as Rama and Krishna, Hanuman, Dattatreya, and Shaiva deities such as Shiva, Parvati, and Ganesha, are popular with Hindus of Maharashtra. The Varkari tradition holds a strong grip on the local Hindus of Maharashtra. The public Ganesha festival started by Bal Gangadhar Tilak in the late 19th century is very popular. Marathi Hindus also revere Bhakti saints associated with varkari sects such as Dnyaneshwar, Savata Mali, Tukaram, Namdev, Janabai, and Chokhamela. Many religious figures from 19th and 20th century are revered. They include Swami Samarth, Gajanan Maharaj, Sai baba of Shirdi, Tukdoji Maharaj, Gondavalekar Maharaj, and Gadge Maharaj.

In every village of Maharashtra, at least one Hindu temple can be found. Maharashtra also has significant Hindu populations with origins in other states and regions of India, which adds to the diversity of temples and traditions in the state. The state has numerous recently built temples by groups such as the Swaminarayan sect, ISKCON, and South Indian communities.

== History ==
Hinduism has been the predominant religion in Maharashtra for a long time. Hindu deities like Shiva and Vishnu shared space with the Buddhist and Jain traditions during the early part of the first millennium CE. The Sathavahanas patronized both Hindu and Buddhist deities and conducted Vedic sacrifices. The common people would have seen little difference between deities belonging to Hindu traditions and deities belonging to other traditions. The successor dynasties to the Sathavahanas, such as the Vakatakas, Chalukyas, Rashtrakutas, and others patronized deities and scholars from all popular religious traditions. The Rashtrakutas king Amoghavarsha I gave a donation to the Kolhapur Mahalakshmi temple for the security of his kingdom although he himself was a Jain.

Beginning in the 8th century, the movement of Bhakti saints spread from Tamil Nadu through the Deccan towards Maharashtra gradually assimilating or displacing Buddhist and Jain traditions so that the vast majority of commoners worshipped gods assimilated into Hinduism. In the 11th century, in the Western Chalukya realm, the Lingayat sect became very popular. Today there is a large population of Lingayats in southern Maharashtra near the Karnataka border, both Kannada and Marathi speaking. Vitthala, a deity originally from Karnataka, became established in the formerly Shaiva town of Pandharpur which is now a centre of Vaishnava pilgrimage. This occurred during the 11th century. In the 12th and 13th centuries, most of Maharashtra came under the Seuna kingdom. During the Yadava reign in the 13th century, the saint Dyaneshwar became promulgating his Bhakti philosophy and gained notability as one of the first saints associated with the Varkaris. During this time the Manubhavana sect dedicated to worship of Krishna also became very popular.

After the Yadavas were conquered and absorbed by the Delhi Sultanate the Deccan fell under Muslim rule. During the conquest the Tughlaqs destroyed the Pandharpur temple. Although the Muslims dominated the upper levels of state administration, they were forced to rely on Hindus for the record keeping and collection of taxes essential to the functioning of the state. Mostly Brahmins were in charge of revenue administration at the village level while various headmen from various castes were given positions of headman of the village (Patil). It is said that Malik Kafur was formerly a Hindu from present Maharashtra, who devastated much of south-central India for the Khiljis. At this time Pandharpur became extremely popular for Vitthala, while Khandoba became a popular folk deity during this period. Due to the lack of elite patronage for Hindu institutions, much of Hindu culture survived in folk culture in rural areas.

Vidharbha on the other hand was ruled by the Gond kings, who had adopted Hinduism and saw themselves as Kshatriya rulers like the Rajputs. They continued to build Hindu temples although many of their tribal kinsfolk only superficially adopted Hindu ways. Even today the Nagpur division has the lowest percentage of Muslims in Maharashtra, with almost none outside urban areas. During Muslim rule the main Hindu castes like the Kunbis and Dhangars began to develop and many of their leaders Sanskritized into a Maratha kinship group defined by 96 clans. The Marathas were largely the headmen of the many villages in the Deccan and sometimes served in the army.

Bhakti culture also strengthened considerably during this period. The earliest saints after Dyaneshwar include Namdev, Savata Mali, Janabai and Chokhamela who both promoted Vitthala Bhakti. Most of these saints came from the lower orders of society which Bhakti gave a voice to and composed in colloquial Marathi rather than Sanskrit. In the 16th and 17th century figures like Eknath and Tukaram continued this process. While most of these saints were Vaishnava, saints like Morya Gosavi promoted the worship of Ganesha, especially around Pune. His Ganapatya sect would gain many adherents here.

Marathi Hindus were important to the administration of the many Deccan sultanates. Marathi Brahmins were revenue collectors and lower government officials while Marathas were recruited into the armies of the various sultanates. In the late 16th century, the Ahmednagar Sultan Malik Ambar relied on Maratha chieftains like Maloji Bhosle to fight in his armies against Mughal domination. Some of these chieftains later joined the Mughals, but many staunchly resisted Mughal domination. The most famous of these kings was Shivaji, who defied Aurangzeb for many years and carved out a kingdom of his own. Shivaji and his successors Sambhaji and Rajaram promoted a revival of Hindu Marathi power in the Deccan. The Chipavan Peshwas would continue this by projecting Maratha power throughout most of India in the 18th century.

In the nineteenth century after the defeat of the Maratha Empire in Third Anglo-Maratha War, Maharashtra was under the British Raj and was divided into Bombay State and few parts under the Hyderabad State. During that time, the casteism in Hindu society was rampant and discrimination against the lower castes was at the peak and the religion showed a great reformation and societal development with the spread of social reform movements in the region led by Jyotirao Phule and other social activists. There was introduction of the Christian missionaries in the country and in Maharashtra, it did not showed effect among the Hindu castes, except for the Mahar. With the motive of organising Hindus as single community K. B. Hedgewar on the day of Dussehra in 1925, along with some of his knowns formed Hindu nationalist organization, Rashtriya Swayamsevak Sangh. The revival of the Hindu nationalism was fueled by the movement across the country by the Rashtriya Swayamsevak Sangh. The unity and strengthening of Marathi Hindu society was also influenced by Veer Savarkar. At that period B. R. Ambedkar, returned to India after studying from abroad united members from his Mahar caste and organized various untouchable castes across India under the Dalit movement. Later after the independence in the year 1956, he along with around 3 million members of his Mahar caste converted to Buddhism.

== Tradition ==
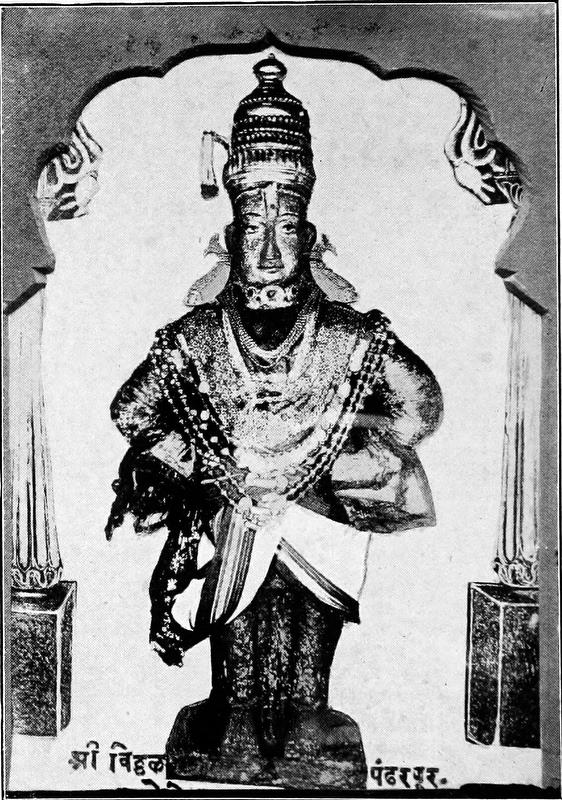
Vithoba is popular deity in Maharashtra.

Varakari is a major tradition followed by Marathi Hindus, and they are Vaishnav devotees. Vitthala is a deity worshipped mostly in Varakari tradition. The main deity worshipped in Maharashtra is Krishna in the form of Viththal.

== Deities ==
Maharashtrian Hindus worship many deities that belong to the traditions of Shaktism, Vaishnavism and Shaivism, most prominently the following:

- Vitthala/Vithoba or Panduranga, a form of Krishna
- Krishna
- Parashurama.*Rama
- Maruti
- Shiva
- Khandoba, an avatar of Shiva.
- Ganapati
- Dattatreya
- Goddesses such as Bhavani, Mahalaxmi, Renuka, Saptashrungi

== Demographics ==
Historical population
Year	Pop.	±%
1951	28,642,304	—
1961	32,530,901	+13.6%
1971	41,307,287	+27.0%
1981	51,109,457	+23.7%
1991	64,033,213	+25.3%
2001	77,859,385	+21.6%
2011	89,703,057	+15.2%
Source: census of India
