= Gilbert Mendonca =

Indian politician (1952–2025)

Member of the Maharashtra Legislative Assembly for Mira Bhayandar
- In office 2009–2014
- Succeeded by: Narendra Mehta

Personal details
- Born: Gilbert John Mendonca; 9 October 1952 Bhayandar, Bombay State, India
- Died: 18 August 2025 (aged 72) Mumbai, Maharashtra, India
- Party: Shiv Sena
- Other political affiliations: Nationalist Congress Party
- Spouse: Myra (died 2014)
- Children: 2

Gilbert John Mendonca (9 October 1952 – 18 August 2025) was an Indian politician from the state of Maharashtra. Mendonca was a one-term member of the Maharashtra Legislative Assembly, serving from 2009 to 2014 in the 12th Assembly.

== Early life and political life ==
Gilbert John Mendonca was born in Bhayandar, Bombay State, India on 9 October 1952. His family belonged to the local Christian community, and he had a business background. He entered politics in 1978, winning the post of Sarpanch of Mira-Bhayandar. He went on to be elected as President of Mira-Bhayandar in 1990 and was elected to the Maharashtra Legislative Assembly (MLA) on a Nationalist Congress Party ticket in 2009, representing Mira Bhayandar (Vidhan Sabha constituency). Mendonca ran in the election against Narendra Mehta of the Bharatiya Janata Party and Chandrakant Vaita of the Maharashtra Navnirman Sena party. Of the 147,584 votes cast, Mendonca received 62,013, Mehta received 51,407, and Vaiti received 27,220 votes. Mendonca's margin of victory was 10,606 votes. Mendonca's candidacy was aided by the residents of Uttan, who protested against the relocation of a dumping ground to their town by refusing to allow any candidate to campaign there except Mendonca, who considered Uttan his "stronghold".

Mendonca was the first member of the Legislative Assembly elected from Mira-Bhayandar. In 2011 he was credited with starting a drive to start local trains from the Mira Road railway station.

In the 2014 Maharashtra Legislative Assembly election, he lost to Mehta by about 30,000 votes.

== Arrest ==
In July 2016, Mendonca was arrested for allegedly participating in a land grabbing case. The land was said to be worth hundreds of crores and a case of alleged cheating and land-grabbing was registered against him and four others. Mendonca spent nine months in jail and was released on bail in May 2017.

Disgruntled with the Nationalist Congress Party, he joined the Shiv Sena and was the face of the Mira-Bhayandar Municipal Corporation elections in 2017.

== Personal life and death ==
Mendonca was married to Myra Mendonca (d. 2014), who was the first mayor of the Mira-Bhayandar Municipal Corporation. The couple had three children: a son, Venture Mendonca, who is a Municipal Corporator in Mira-Bhayandar Municipal Corporation, and a daughter, Caitlin Pereira, who served as mayor of Mira-Bhayandar Municipal Corporation from 2012 to 2017 and the youngest daughter Asenla Mendonca.

Mendonca died in Mumbai on 18 August 2025, at the age of 72.
