= Dharavi Island =

Island within the city of Mumbai, India

Coordinates: 19°15′N 72°48′E

Dharavi Island (also known as Dharavi Bhet) is an island situated at the mouth of Vasai Creek on the western side of Salsette Island, within the city of Mumbai, India. Dharavi Island comprises six villages, Dongri, Uttan, Pali, Chowk, Gorai, and Manori.

== History ==
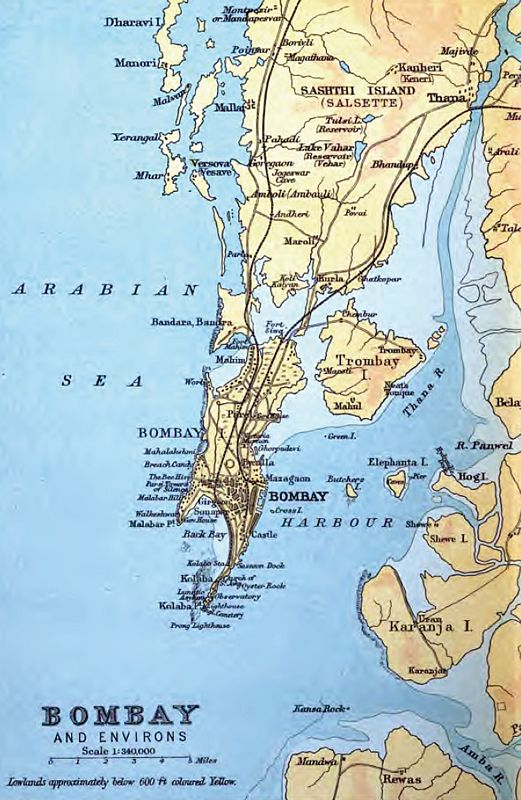
1893 Map of Salsette Island showing Dharavi Island at top Left corner

Dharavi Island is located on the western side of Salsette, situated at the mouth of the Bassein creek. The island is named after the Dharavi Devi Mandir, a Hindu temple dedicated to Dharavi, one of the deities in Hinduism. The word, Dharavi translates to loose mud in Tamil language. There, confusion often arises between Dharavi Island and Dharavi, a residential slum area of Mumbai.

Dharavi Island is also home to the East Indian community, who are considered the original residents of Bombay, tracing their roots back to places like the Isle of Bombay, Thane, Salsette, and Bassein (now Vasai). In the 15th and 16th centuries, Portuguese missionaries converted locals to Roman Catholicism, particularly among farming, fishing, and salt-making communities.

== Culture ==
Kulvem Village in Gorai retains much of its traditional ambience. The East Indians are mainly engaged in agriculture, and live in century-old homes with Mangalorean tiled roofs, wooden balconies, and spacious kitchens equipped with backdoors for livestock like pigs.

In Uttan, the East Indian Museum, founded by the Mogai Gauthan Panchayat, displays artefacts like the 'Puraan', a Bible from 17th-century, written in the East Indian language using the Roman script.

There are many religious places on the island, like Our Lady of the Sea Church in Uttan, which was built around 1664, and the over 400-year-old Our Lady of Bethlehem Church. The remnants of Infant Jesus Church, which was destroyed after the Maratha invasion in 1739, are visible from Vairala Tank.

These villages of Dharavi Island are primarily inhabited by marginalized communities, including the Kolis, the Kunbis, and the Bhandaris.

== Economy ==
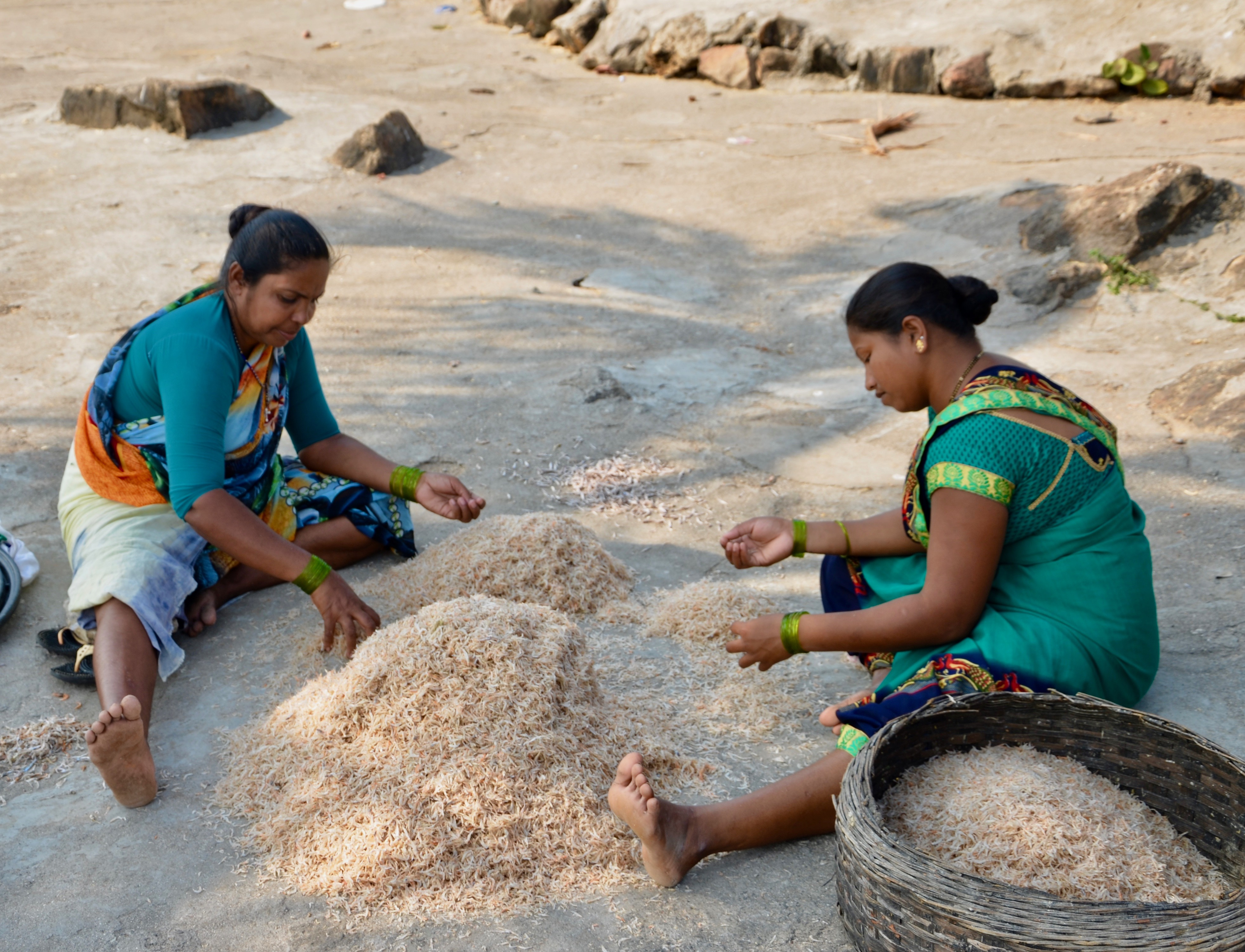
Women working in Uttan, Velankanni Beach of Dharavi Island

Women's groups on Dharavi Island engage in various activities, including preparing fish and vegetable pickles, crafting bottle masalas, and making rice handbreads. They also run catering services, make candles, and participate in other Income Generation Programs (IGPs). These groups receive ongoing training to improve product quality and marketing abilities.

== Archaeology ==
In the archaeological discoveries of Dharavi Island, two Gadhegals or donkey stones from the 12th century were found, depicting a donkey engaged in intercourse with a woman. Over generations, villagers have held these stones in reverence. In 2012, archaeologists interpreted these stones as declarations of land grants, warning of severe punishment for trespassers.

== Gallery ==
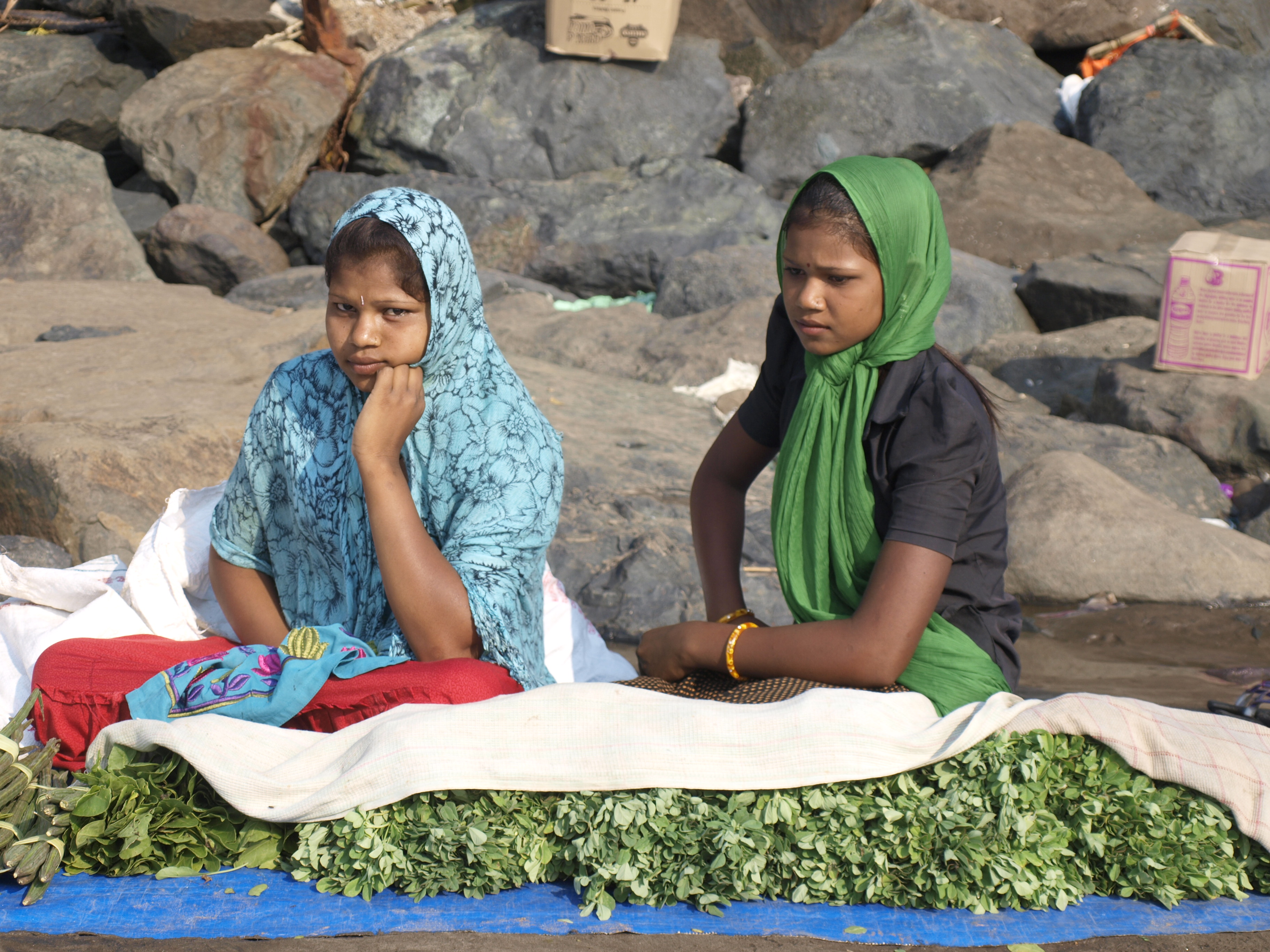
Vegetable vendors on the Gorai beach

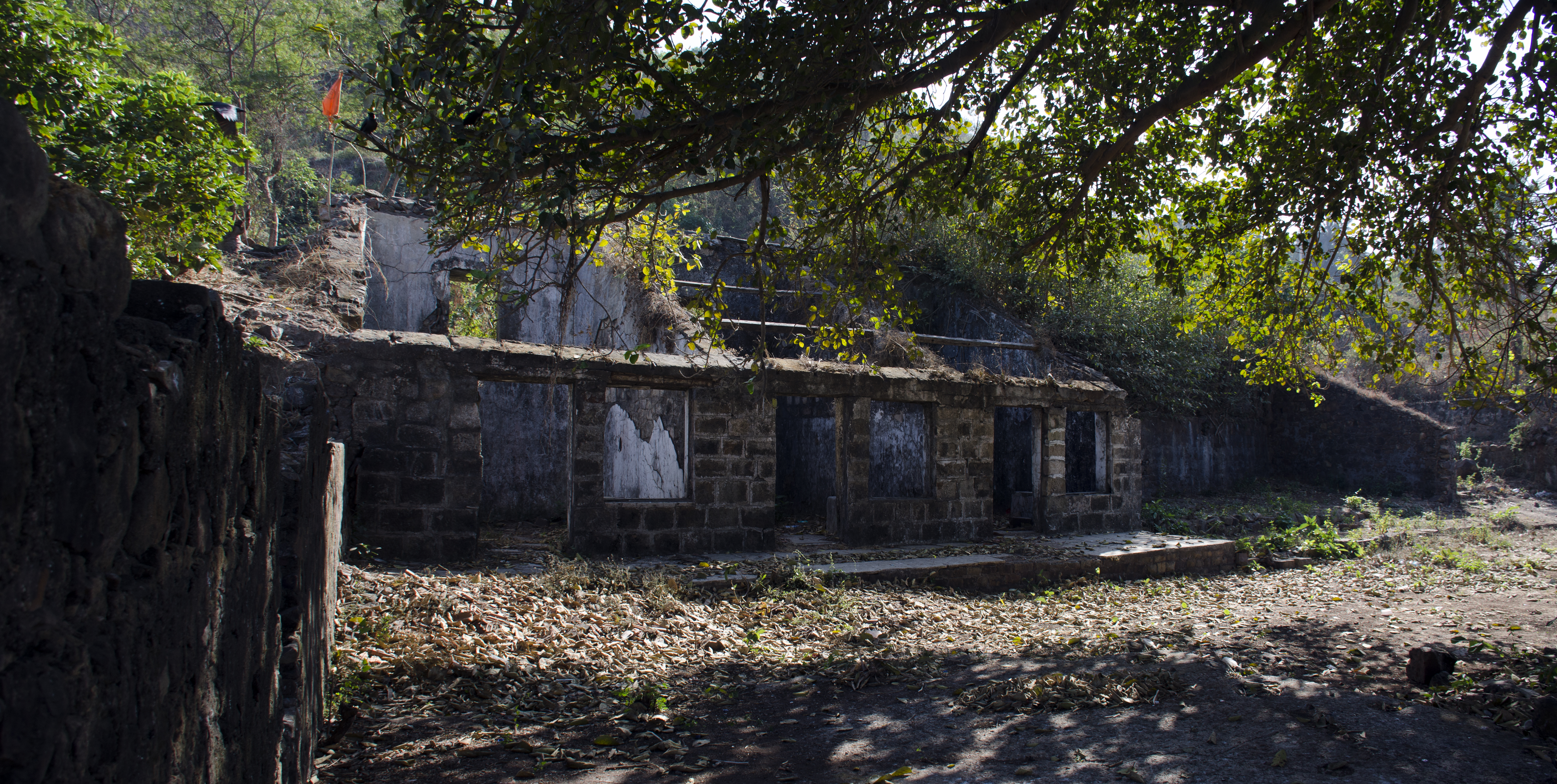
Dongri Fort, locally known as the Janjire Dhavari Fort at Dharavi Island

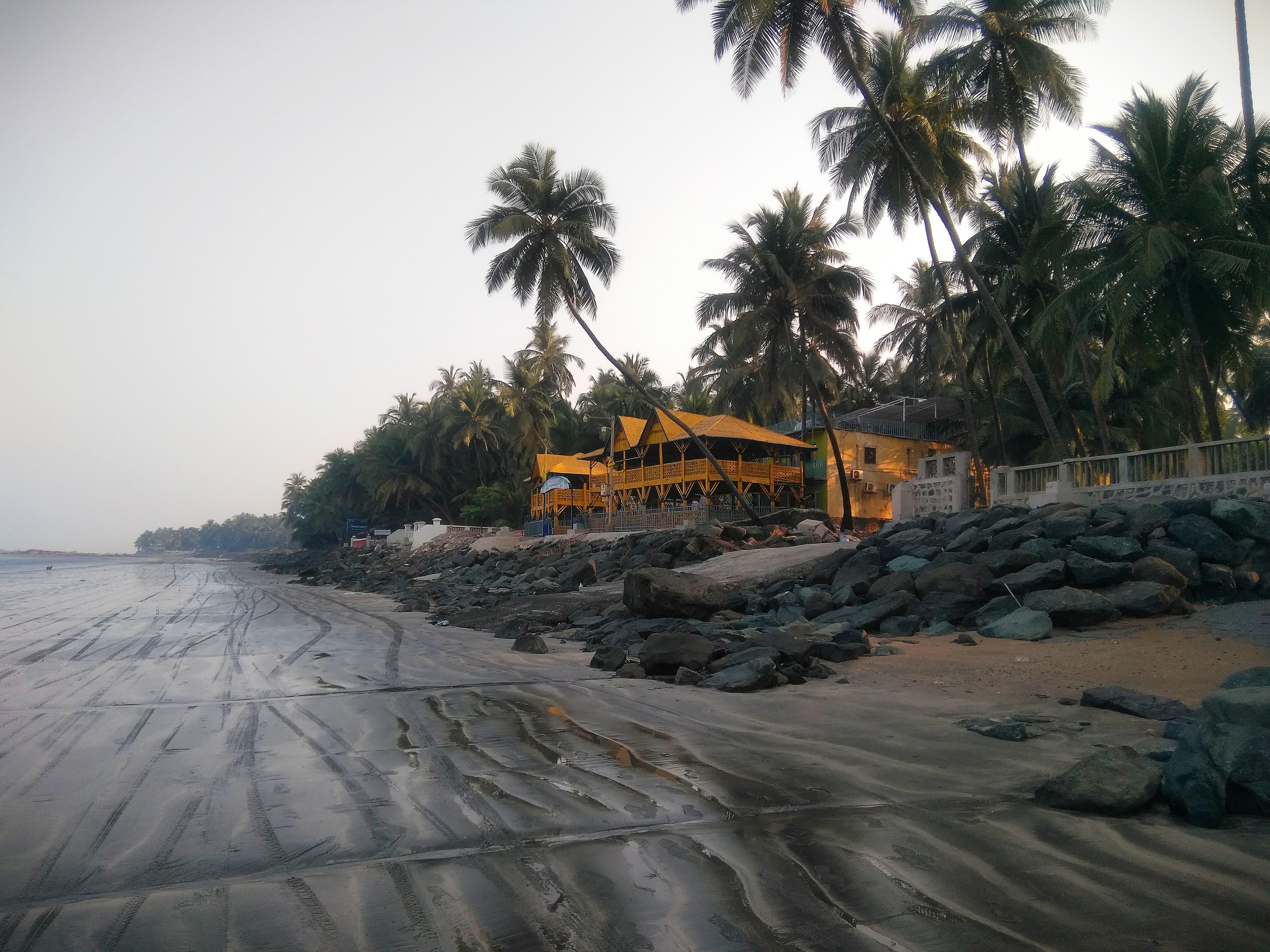
Gorai Beach

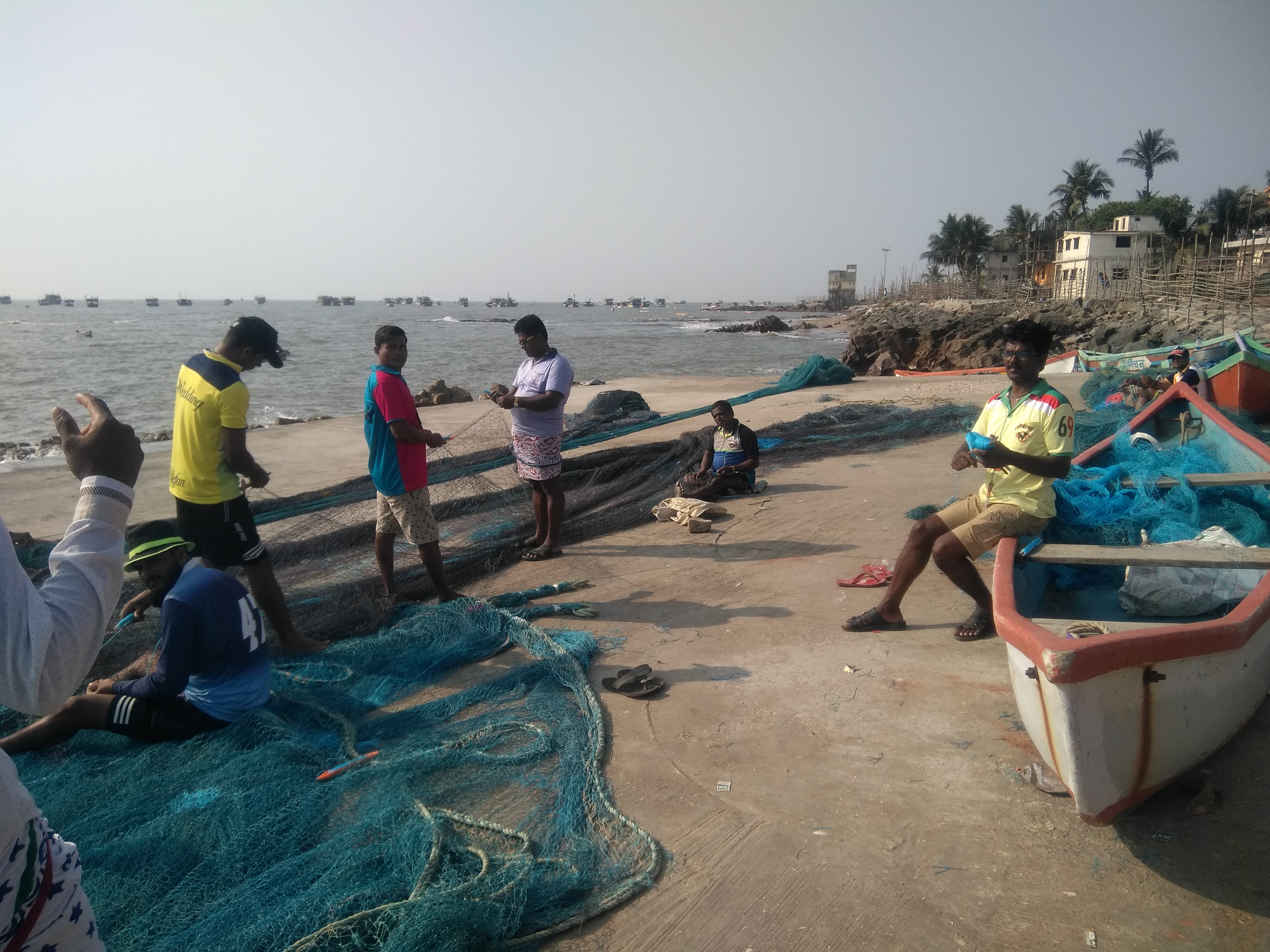
Fishermen

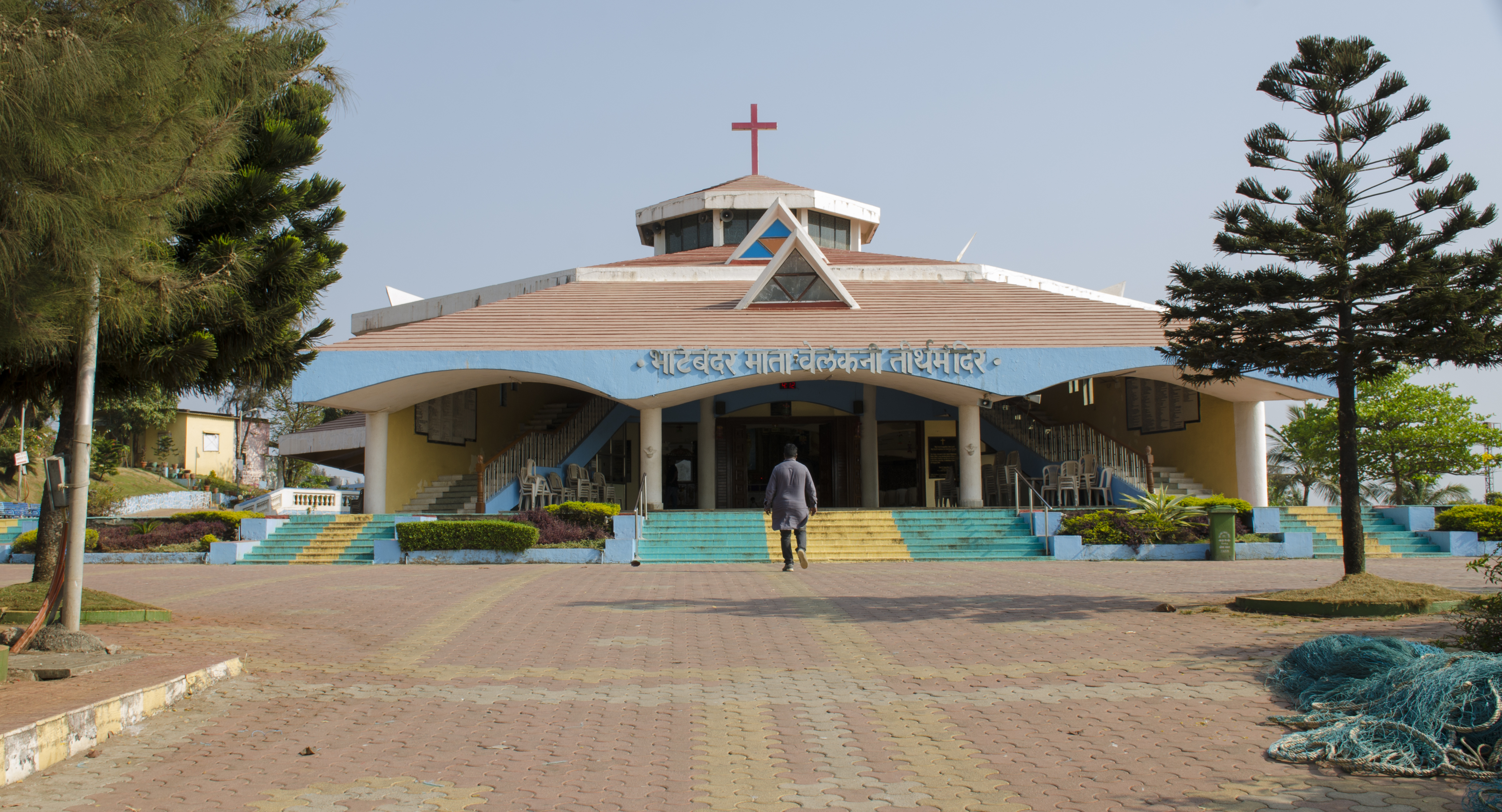
Velankanni Church, Uttan

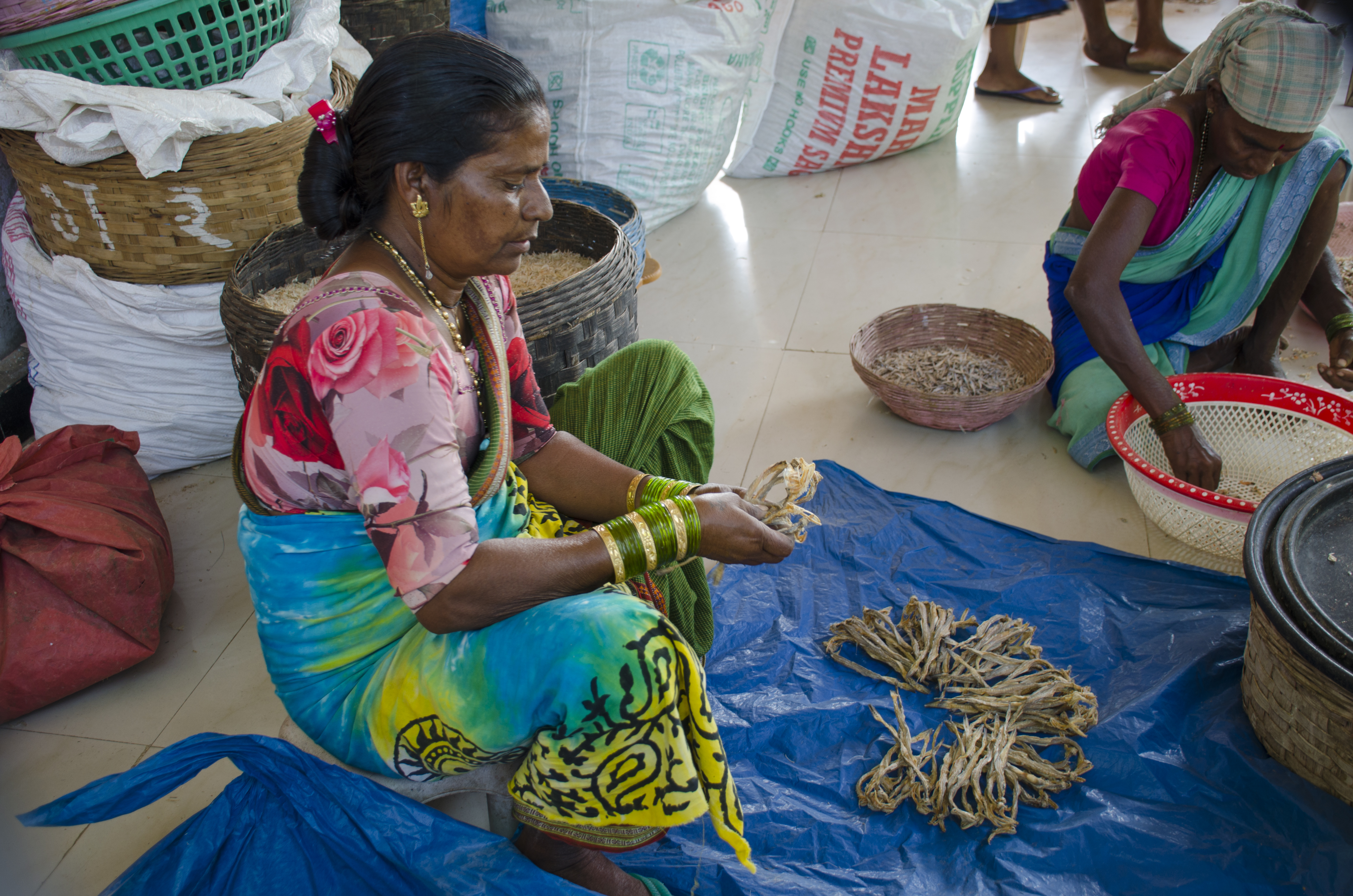
Fish Sorting, Velenkani Beach, Uttan

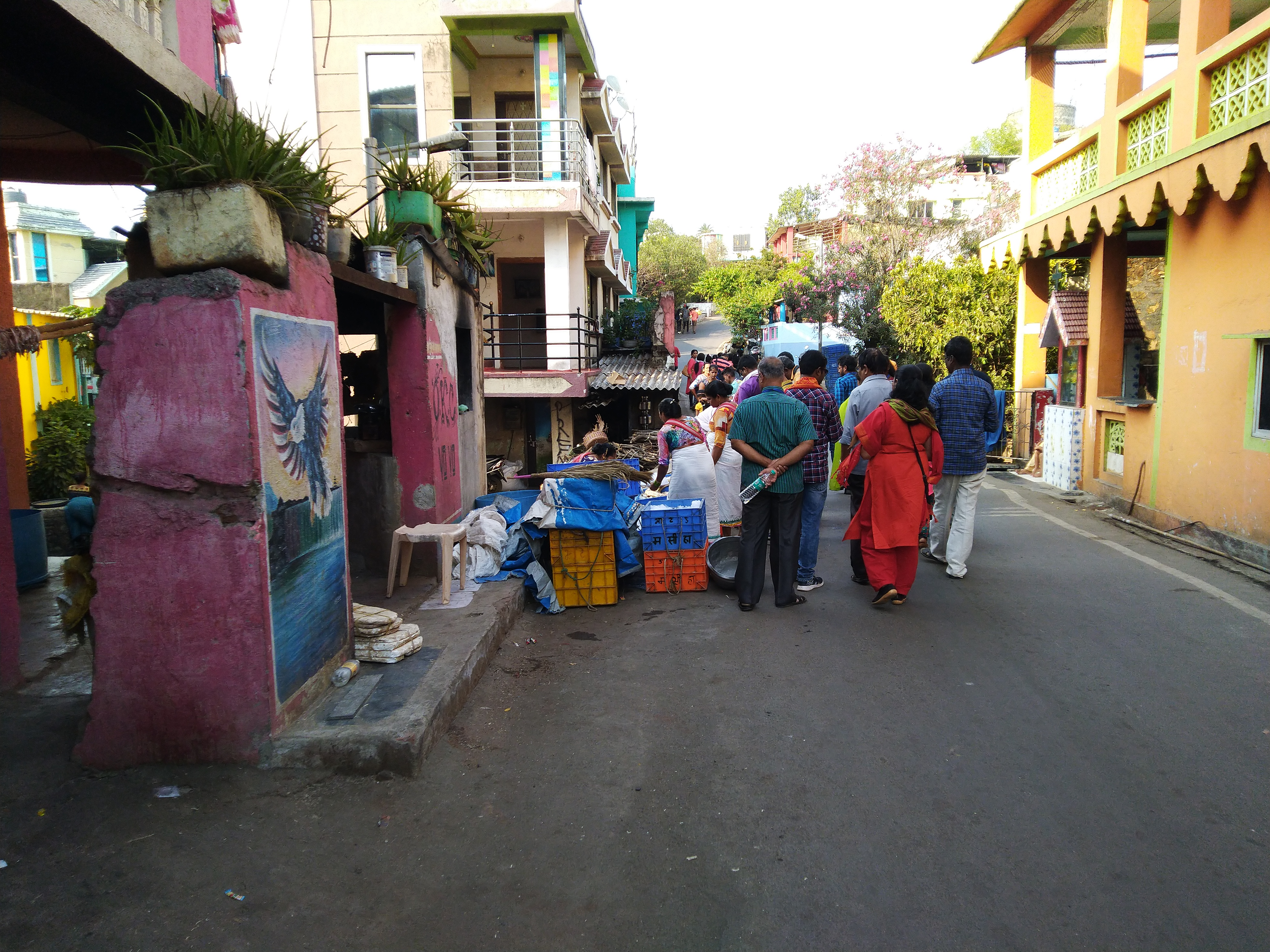
Fish market in Uttan

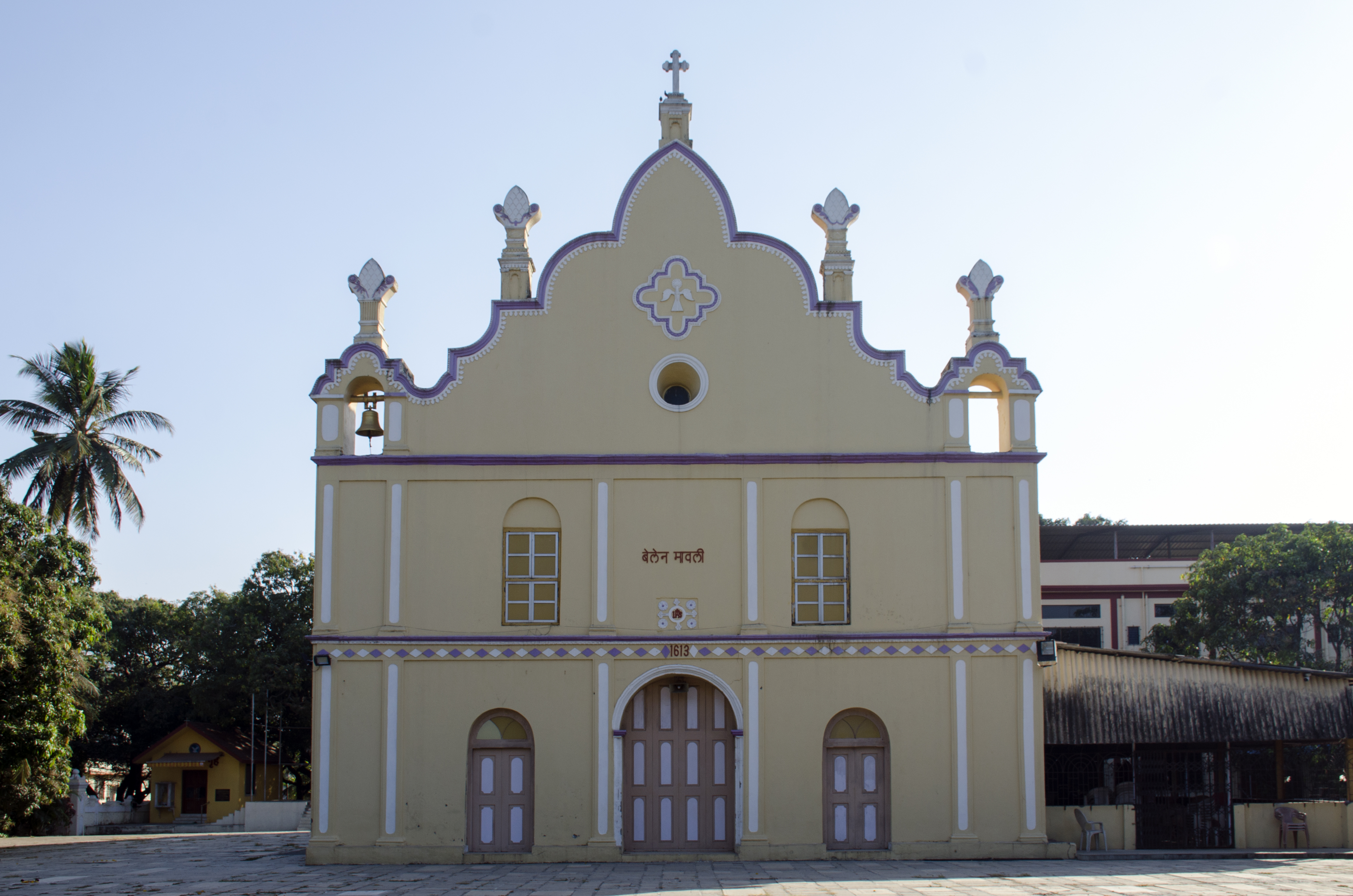
Church of Our Lady of Bethlehem

== See also ==
- Dongri Fort
- Gorai
- Manori
