= Mira-Bhayandar Assembly constituency =

Constituency of the Maharashtra legislative assembly in India

Coordinates: 19.291°N 72.852°E

Mira-Bhayandar
- Constituency No. 145 for the Maharashtra Legislative Assembly

Constituency details
- Country: India
- Region: Western India
- State: Maharashtra
- Division: Konkan
- District: Thane
- Lok Sabha constituency: Thane
- Established: 2009
- Reservation: None

Member of Legislative Assembly
- 15th Maharashtra Legislative Assembly
- Incumbent Narendra Mehta
- Party: Bharatiya Janata Party
- Elected year: 2024

Mira Bhayandar Assembly constituency is one of the 288 Vidhan Sabha (Legislative Assembly) constituencies of Maharashtra state in western India.

== Overview ==
Mira Bhayandar constituency is one of the 18 Vidhan Sabha constituencies located in Thane district. It comprises part of the Mira-Bhayandar Municipal Corporation and part of Thane tehsil of the district.

Mira Bhayandar is part of Thane Lok Sabha constituency along with five other Vidhan Sabha segments, namely, Kopri-Pachpakhadi, Ovala-Majiwada, Thane, Airoli and Belapur in Thane district.

== Members of the Legislative Assembly ==
Year	Member	Party
Until 2008: Constituency did not exist
2009	Gilbert Mendonca	Nationalist Congress Party
2014	Narendra Mehta	Bharatiya Janata Party
2019	Geeta Jain	Independent politician
2024	Narendra Mehta	Bharatiya Janata Party

== Election results ==
=== Assembly Election 2024 ===
2024 Maharashtra Legislative Assembly election : Mira Bhayandar
Party	Candidate	Votes	%	±%
BJP	Narendra Mehta	144,376	55.35%	▲24.70
INC	Syed Muzaffar Hussain	83,943	32.18%	▲5.42
Independent	Geeta Bharat Jain	23,051	8.84%	New
MNS	Sandeep Rane	5,243	2.01%	▲0.13
NOTA	None of the Above	2,279	0.87%	▼0.38
Margin of victory		60,433	23.17%	▲15.74
Turnout		263,129	51.50%	▲3.09
Total valid votes		260,850		
Registered electors		510,890		▲16.86
BJP gain from Independent		Swing	▲17.28	

=== Assembly Election 2019 ===
2019 Maharashtra Legislative Assembly election : Mira Bhayandar
Party	Candidate	Votes	%	±%
Independent	Geeta Bharat Jain	79,575	38.07%	New
BJP	Narendra Mehta	64,049	30.64%	▼17.53
INC	Syed Muzaffar Hussain	55,939	26.76%	▲16.50
MNS	Haresh Eknath Sutar	3,936	1.88%	New
NOTA	None of the Above	2,623	1.25%	▲0.00
AAP	Ca Narendra Bhambwani	2,042	0.98%	New
VBA	Salim Abbas Khan	1,421	0.68%	New
Margin of victory		15,526	7.43%	▼9.58
Turnout		211,656	48.41%	▼3.61
Total valid votes		209,013		
Registered electors		437,178		▲19.79
Independent gain from BJP		Swing	▼10.10	

=== Assembly Election 2014 ===
2014 Maharashtra Legislative Assembly election : Mira Bhayandar
Party	Candidate	Votes	%	±%
BJP	Narendra Mehta	91,468	48.17%	▲13.34
NCP	Gilbert John Mendonca	59,176	31.17%	▼10.85
INC	Yakub Kureshi	19,489	10.26%	New
SS	Prabhakar Padmakar Mhatre	18,171	9.57%	New
NOTA	None of the Above	2,378	1.25%	New
Margin of victory		32,292	17.01%	▲9.82
Turnout		192,265	52.68%	▲7.08
Total valid votes		189,871		
Registered electors		364,958		▲11.15
BJP gain from NCP		Swing	▲6.16	

=== Assembly Election 2009 ===
2009 Maharashtra Legislative Assembly election : Mira Bhayandar
Party	Candidate	Votes	%	±%
NCP	Gilbert John Mendonca	62,013	42.02%	New
BJP	Narendra Mehta	51,409	34.83%	New
MNS	Chandrakant Sitaram Vaity	27,220	18.44%	New
BSP	Mukeshkumar Masum Chandrapal	1,669	1.13%	New
JD(S)	Milan Vasant Mhatre	1,370	0.93%	New
Independent	Sayyad Asif Meer Patel	1,281	0.87%	New
Margin of victory		10,604	7.18%	
Turnout		147,591	44.95%	
Total valid votes		147,586		
Registered electors		328,354		
NCP win (new seat)				

== See also ==
- Mira-Bhayandar
- List of constituencies of Maharashtra Vidhan Sabha
