= Dharavi (disambiguation) =

Dharavi is a slum in Mumbai, India.

Dharavi may also refer to:

- Dharavi (Vidhan Sabha constituency), a constituency located in Mumbai City district
- Dharavi metro station, of the Mumbai Metro
- Dharavi Island, in Mumbai
- Dharavi Bhet, a peninsula near Mumbai, India
- Dharavi (1992 film), a 1992 Indian Hindi-language film
- Dharavi (2018 film), a 2018 Indian Tamil-language film

== See also ==
- Dharavi Bank, a 2022 Indian television series
