= Dongri Jail =

British era jail on Jail road, Dongri

Dongri jail is a British era jail on Jail road, Dongri, an area in Mumbai, India. It played an important role in the Indian freedom movement, as it played host to a number of under-trial freedom fighters like Bal Gangadhar Tilak, Savarkar and Agarkar.

The jail was built by the British in the eighteenth century as on 1804. Originally located within the Dongri fort ramparts, building of a separate jail was first suggested by Aungler in 1671. The people initially detained here included both, Indians as well as British nationals. For instance, in March 1701, the Provost Marshal John Hall was confined to the Dongri jail for being drunk. As time progressed, especially towards the end of the nineteenth and beginning of twentieth centuries, its inmates mostly consisted of Indians, especially those charged with sedition (usually freedom fighters) or people awaiting trial.

It now functions as a juvenile delinquents home for children who are below 18 years of age, convicted of crimes.

== Renovation ==
In 2024, the historic Dongri Children's Home, originally constructed in 1804 as Dongri Jail, underwent a significant transformation to create a more child-friendly environment. Spearheaded by Justice Revati Mohite Dere and implemented by the Maharashtra Public Works Department, the renovation aimed to foster a nurturing atmosphere conducive to the development and rehabilitation of the children housed there. The revamp introduced colorful walls, murals, and improved living facilities, shifting the space from its austere roots to a more supportive setting.

== List of famous inmates ==
- Bal Gangadhar Tilak (1882)
- Gopal Ganesh Agarkar (1882)
- Veer Vinayak Damodar Savarkar (1911)
