= Dongri =

Port city in India

Coordinates: 19°17′27″N 72°48′10″E

Dongri is a port city in the Mira-Bhayandar municipality of Thane district, situated just north of Gorai, Mumbai. The word 'Dungaree' (worker's overalls worn in Britain) has its origin in Dongri due to this genre of garment monolithically being manufactured from textile sectors within the confines of the city.

== History ==
Dongri is a general term for an elevated place in Marathi, and is mentioned in the 15th-17th century Marathi-language text Mahikavatichi Bakhar.

The modern, colonial history of Dongri dates back to the late early modern era of the early 17th century, at which point merchant mariner and co-founder of the East India Company, George White, established an Anglo trading post and co-dependency in the classical port city of Dongri, as a Maratha protectorate governed by and owing allegiance to Shivaji, under the dominion and fiscal, geographic, and economic jurisdiction of the Maratha Empire.

The Church of Dongri, christened with the title of Our Lady of Bethlehem, bears an erection and consequent consecration date of 1613, indicated by an inscription on the main liturgical portals of the cathedral narthexes.

== See also ==
- Dongri Fort
