= Syed Muzaffar Hussain =

Indian National Congress Politician

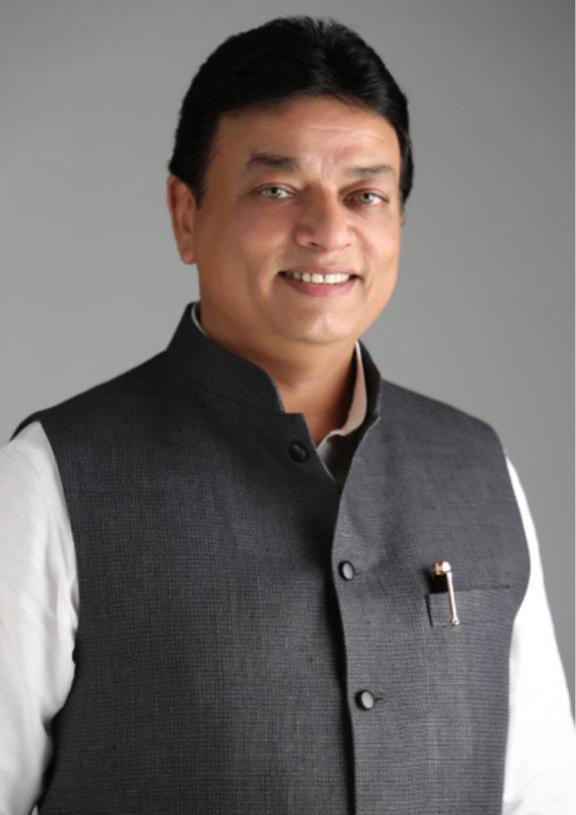

Member of Legislative Council of Maharashtra
- In office 7 July 2004 – 6 July 2010
- In office 7 July 2010 – 6 July 2016

Personal details
- Born: 26 August 1966 (age 59) Maharashtra
- Party: Indian National Congress
- Parent(s): Sayed Nazar Hussain, Sayed Noorzahan Hussain
- Occupation: Politician, agriculturist
- Profession: Healthcare, Education, Social Work, Real Estate
- Website: www.muzaffarhussain.com

Syed Muzaffar Hussain (born 26 August 1966) Son of Sayed Nazar Hussain & Sayed Noorzahan Hussain is an Indian National Congress politician from Mira Bhainder City located in Thane district who has twice served on the Legislative Council for the state of Maharashtra. He was elected as Corporator to the Mira-Bhayander Municipal Council in 1991. He served as First Deputy Mayor of Mira Bhayandar City when Municipal Corporation was formed. He is currently Parliamentary Board Member of Maharashtra Pradesh Congress Committee. Known for his oratory skills he has won Best Parliamentarian, Best Speaker Award by President of India Smt. Pratibatai Patil.

Hussain is an agriculturist, a philanthropist, Real Estate Developer and the founder of AsmitA group, a prominent real estate firm.He is a businessman by profession, and has helped fund construction of many projects in the district of Thane that have included parks and hospitals, cremation and burial grounds. He was initially elected to the legislative council first in 2004, where he served until 2009 and later from 2010 to 2016. He is Former Youth Congress President of Maharashtra.

Hussain was appointed as one of working presidents along with four others before Maharashtra Legislative Assembly Election of 2019 for the Maharashtra Pradesh Congress Committee.

== Political career ==
Muzaffar Hussain started his political journey as a Youth Congress worker in 1985. He subsequently was elected as Corporator and went on to become First Deputy Mayor of Mira Bhayandar Municipal Corporation after its inception in 2002. He is credited for creating Development Plan of Mira Bhayandar City in 1998 when population of city was just less than 200000 but due to his efficient plan city developed in a planned manner and his plan guided the city for 20+ years. Later he was twice elected as Member of the Legislative Council. Known for his Organisational Skills he was appointed as Working President of Maharashtra Pradesh Congress Committee in 2019. Trustee of many Charitable Trusts and Associations which primarily focuses on healthcare, sports, agriculture, education and charity. He was reappointed as Working President of Maharashtra Pradesh Congress Committee before Maharashtra Assembly Elections 2024 due to his experience in Organization.

Positions Held
Year	Position
2024	Working President, Maharashtra Pradesh Congress Committee
2019-2022	Working President, Maharashtra Pradesh Congress Committee
2014 - 2016	Member of Maharashtra Legislative Council (M.LC.)
2010	All India Congress Observer, Uttar Pradesh Assemble Elections (2012)
2004 - 2019	General Secretary, Maharashtra Pradesh Congress
2004 - 2009	Member of Maharashtra Legislative Council (M.LC.)
2004 - 2006	Spokesperson, MPCC and In-charge of Media Centre for MPCC
2002 - 2004	Deputy Mayor, M.B.M.C
1999 - 2004	President, Maharashtra Pradesh Youth Congress
1996 - 2001 1992 - 1996	Municipal Corporator, Mira Bhayandar
1985 - 1987	President, Mira Road Ward
