= Global Vipassana Pagoda =

Meditation hall in Maharashtra, India

Coordinates: 19°13′41″N 72°48′21.79″E

Global pagoda
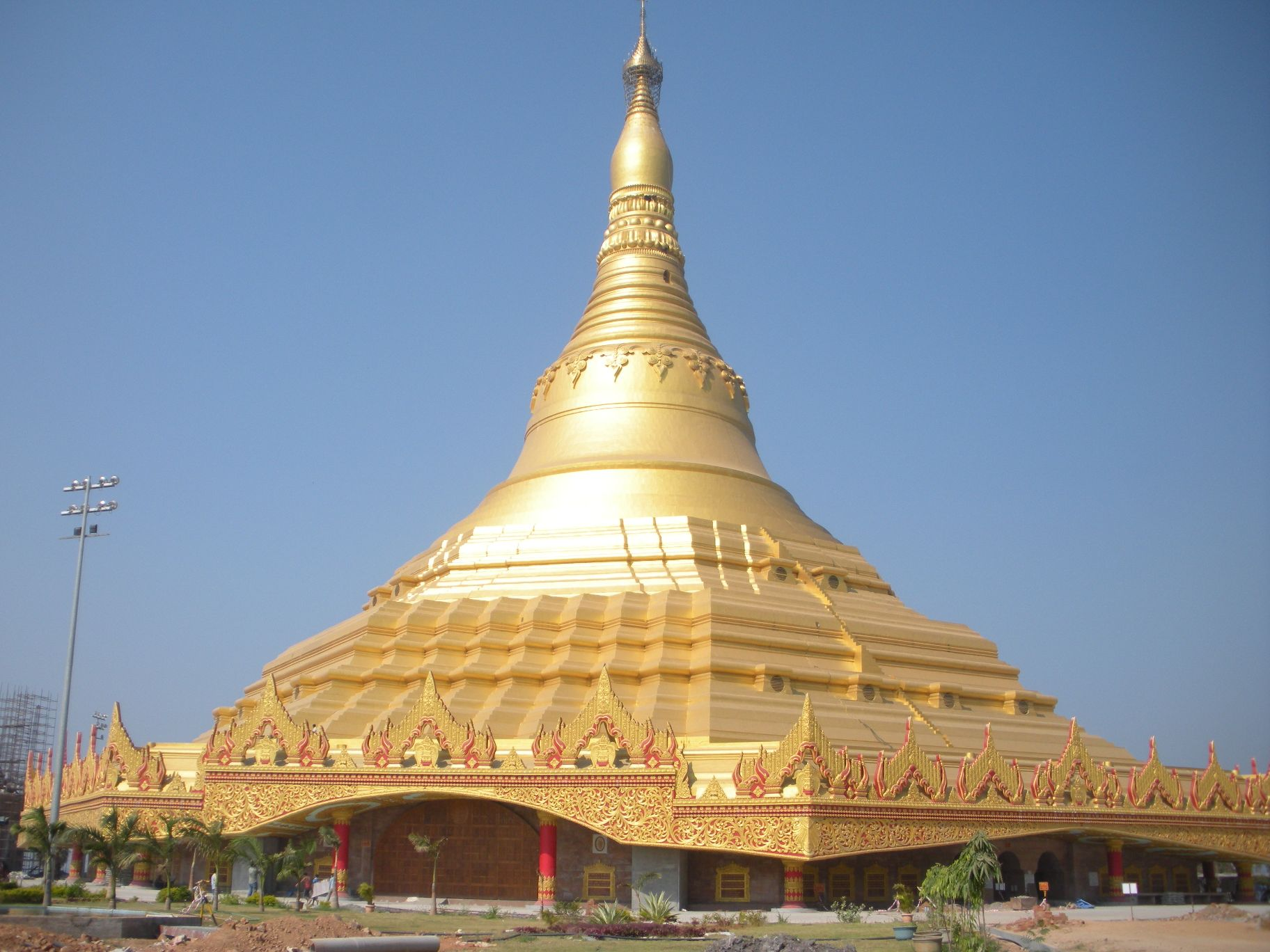
- Global Vipassana Pagoda in 2012

General information
- Type: Meditation Dome Hall
- Architectural style: Burmese
- Location: Gorai, Village, Borivali West, Mumbai
- Construction started: 2000
- Completed: 2008
- Opened: 8 February 2009

Technical details
- Structural system: Stone dome, with self-supporting interlocking stones

Design and construction
- Architects: Archirect. Pervez Dumasia; Consulting Engineer: N.R.Varma, Sompura; Consultant: Chandubhai Sompura
- Structural engineer: Nandadeep Building Center (NPPCPL) Aurangabad M.S.

The Global Vipassana Pagoda is a meditation dome hall with a capacity to seat around 8,000 Vipassana meditators (the largest such Meditation hall in the world) near Gorai, and is also the main attraction in Gorai, in the north western part of Mumbai, Maharashtra, India. The Global Vipassana Pagoda is "declared as one of the ‘Seven Wonders of Maharashtra" by the Maharashtra Tourism Development Corporation (MTDC) in partnership with ABP Majha, a Marathi news channel, after they reviewed 350 destinations. The results of this selection were declared on 6th June, 2013. The pagoda was inaugurated by Pratibha Patil, the then President of India, on 8 February, 2009. It is built on donated land on a peninsula between the Gorai creek and the Arabian Sea. The pagoda is to serve as a monument of peace and harmony. The Global Vipassana Pagoda has been built out of gratitude to Sayagyi U Ba Khin (1899-1971), a Vipassana teacher and the first Accountant-General of Independent Burma, who was instrumental in Vipassana returning to India, the country of its origin.

Built entirely through voluntary donations, the purpose of the Global Vipassana Pagoda is to share information about Vipassana and about the Buddha and his teachings.—The golden dome of the Pagoda is visible from across Gorai Creek, and its night view is shown in the photographs below.

Vipassanā is the practical quintessence of the universal, non-sectarian teachings of the Buddha.

== Description ==
The cent lobal Vipassana Pagoda contains the world's largest stone dome, built without any supporting pillars. The height of the dome is approximately 29 meters, while the height of the building is 99.06 meters, which is twice the size of the previously largest hollow stone monument in the world, the Gol Gumbaz Dome in Bijapur, India. The external diameter of the largest section of the dome is 97.46 m, and the shorter sections are 94.82 m. The internal diameter is 85.15 m. The inside of the pagoda is hollow and serves as a very large meditation hall, with an area covering more than 6,000 m^{2} (65,000 ft^{2}). The massive inner dome seats over 8,000 people, enabling them to practice the non-sectarian Vipassana Meditation as taught by S. N. Goenka, and is now being practiced in over 100 countries. An inaugural one-day Meditation course was held at the pagoda on 21 December 2008, with Goenka in attendance as the teacher.

Ten-day Vipassana Meditation courses are held free of charge at the Dhamma Pattana Meditation center, which is part of the Global Vipassana Pagoda complex.

== Construction history ==
=== Timeline ===
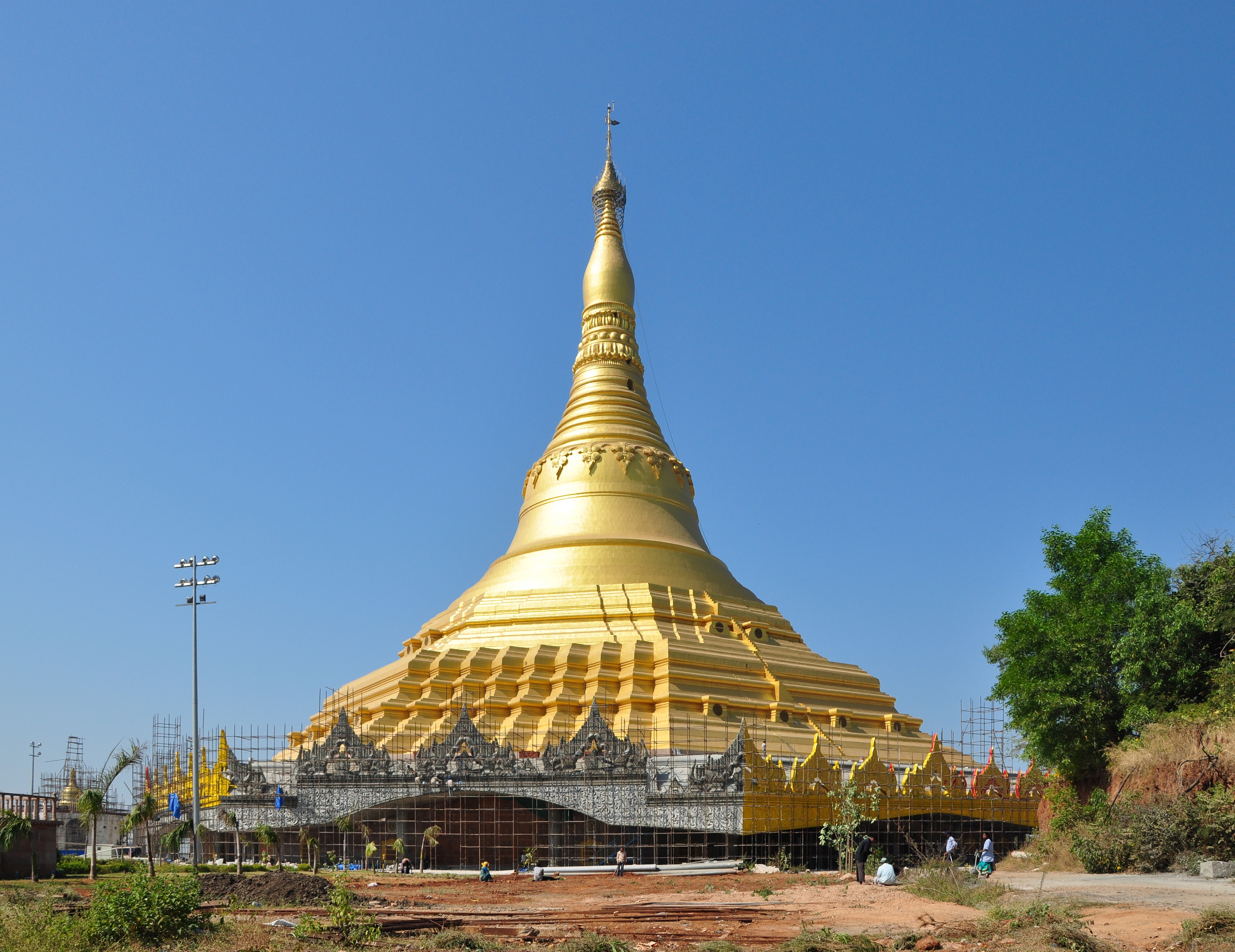
Global Vipassana Pagoda under construction

Planning for the construction of the Global Vipassana Pagoda began in 1997, while actual building work started in 2000. The pagoda consists of three sub-domes. The first and largest dome was completed in October 2006 when bone relics of Gotama Buddha were enshrined in the central locking stone of the dome on 29 October 2006, making it the world's largest structure containing relics of the Buddha. The relics were originally found in the stupa at Bhattiprolu, Guntur district, Andhra Pradesh, South India. They have been donated by the Mahabodhi Society of India and the prime minister of Sri Lanka to be kept at the Global Vipassana Pagoda. The second and third domes sit atop the first dome. Construction of the third dome was structurally completed on 21 November 2008.

The Global Vipassana Pagoda complex is an evolving construction. A museum depicts the historical life and non-sectarian teaching of Gotama the Buddha. The Global Vipassana Pagoda's educational displays communicate the Buddha's teaching of the universal practice of Vipassana as a path towards real happiness.

The Global Vipassana Pagoda complex consists of the following structures:

- Pagoda dome containing relics of the Buddha. The pillar-less structure of the massive Pagoda dome encompasses a Meditation hall to seat around 8,000 Vipassana meditators - the largest such Meditation hall in the world.
- Vipassana Meditation centre Dhamma Pattana
- Museum depicting the historical life of the Buddha
- Two smaller pagodas on the north and south side
- Library and study rooms
- Circumambulation path around the dome
- Administration building
- Underground parkade
- Vipassana Research Institute office and facility for Pali study program
- Dhammalaya Guest House for Vipassana meditators

The south pagoda contains 108 Meditation cells for use by Vipassana students taking a Meditation course at the adjoining Meditation centre.

=== Construction materials ===
The foundation of the dome consists of basalt, while the dome itself is made from sandstone, brought from Rajasthan. The individual blocks of sandstone weigh between 600–700 kg each and are kept in place due to the unique design of the bricks. Each of the bricks interlocks with the ones adjacent to it, and lime mortar is used to fill in any remaining gaps. The circumambulation path is laid in marble.

The pinnacle of the pagoda is adorned with a large crystal. The spire is covered in real gold, while the rest of the pagoda is covered in gold paint. The spire is topped with a special ornamental umbrella piece donated by the Burmese. The main doors to the pagoda are wooden and hand-carved in Myanmar (Burma).

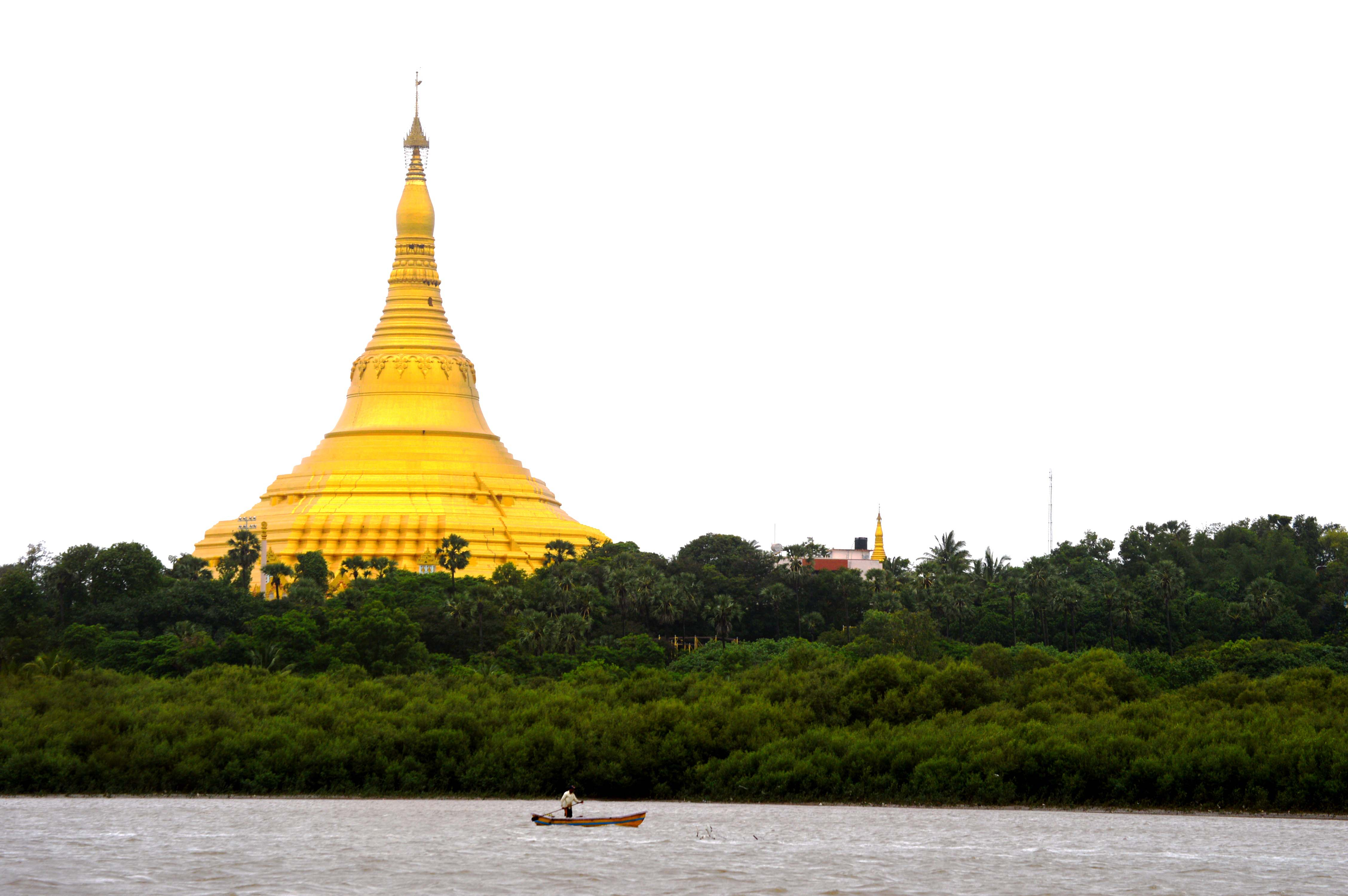
View from the Arabian sea

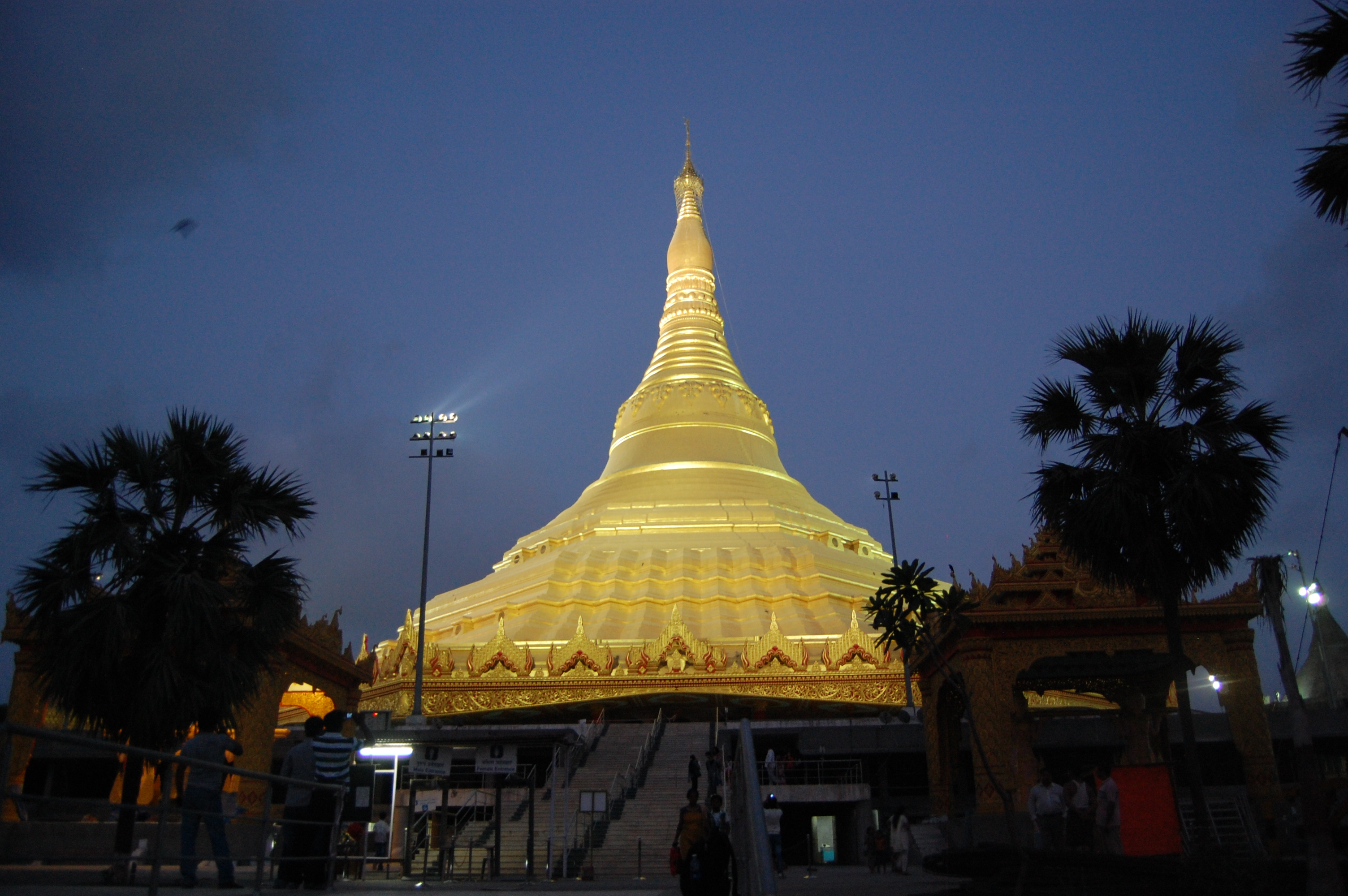
Night view of main entrance

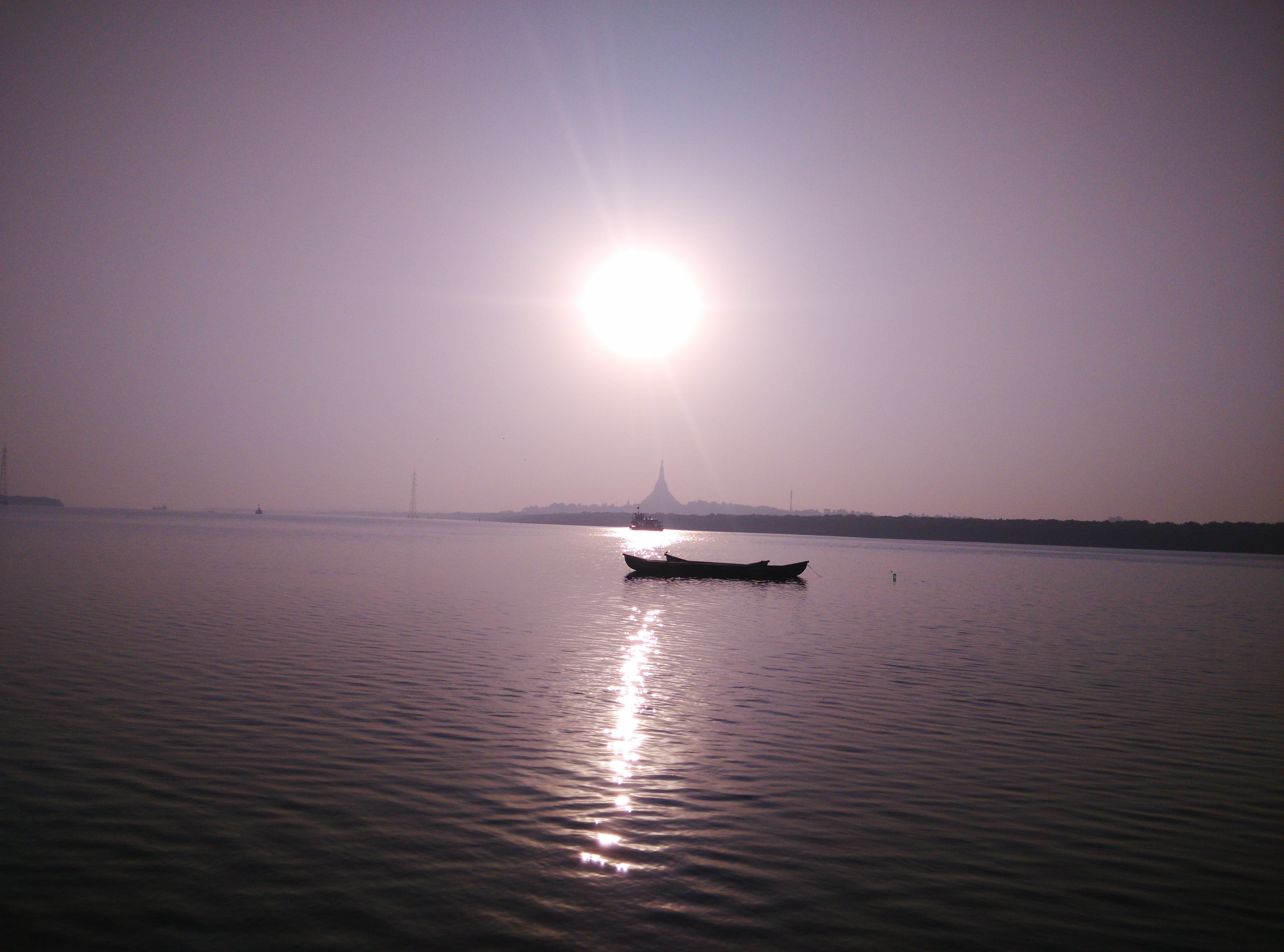
View of the pagoda from Gorai Creek at sunset

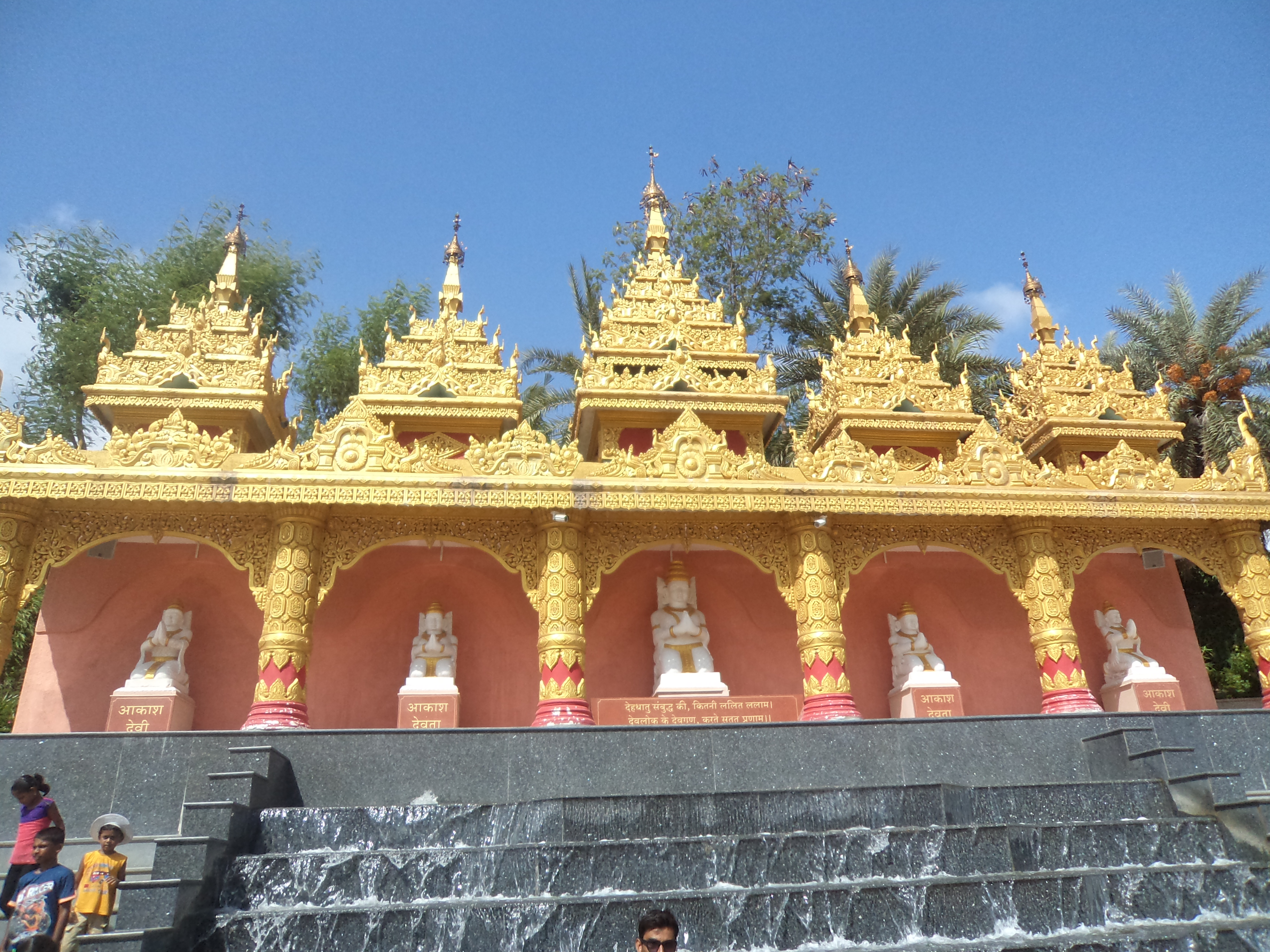
Amazing monuments in the Global Vipassana Pagoda

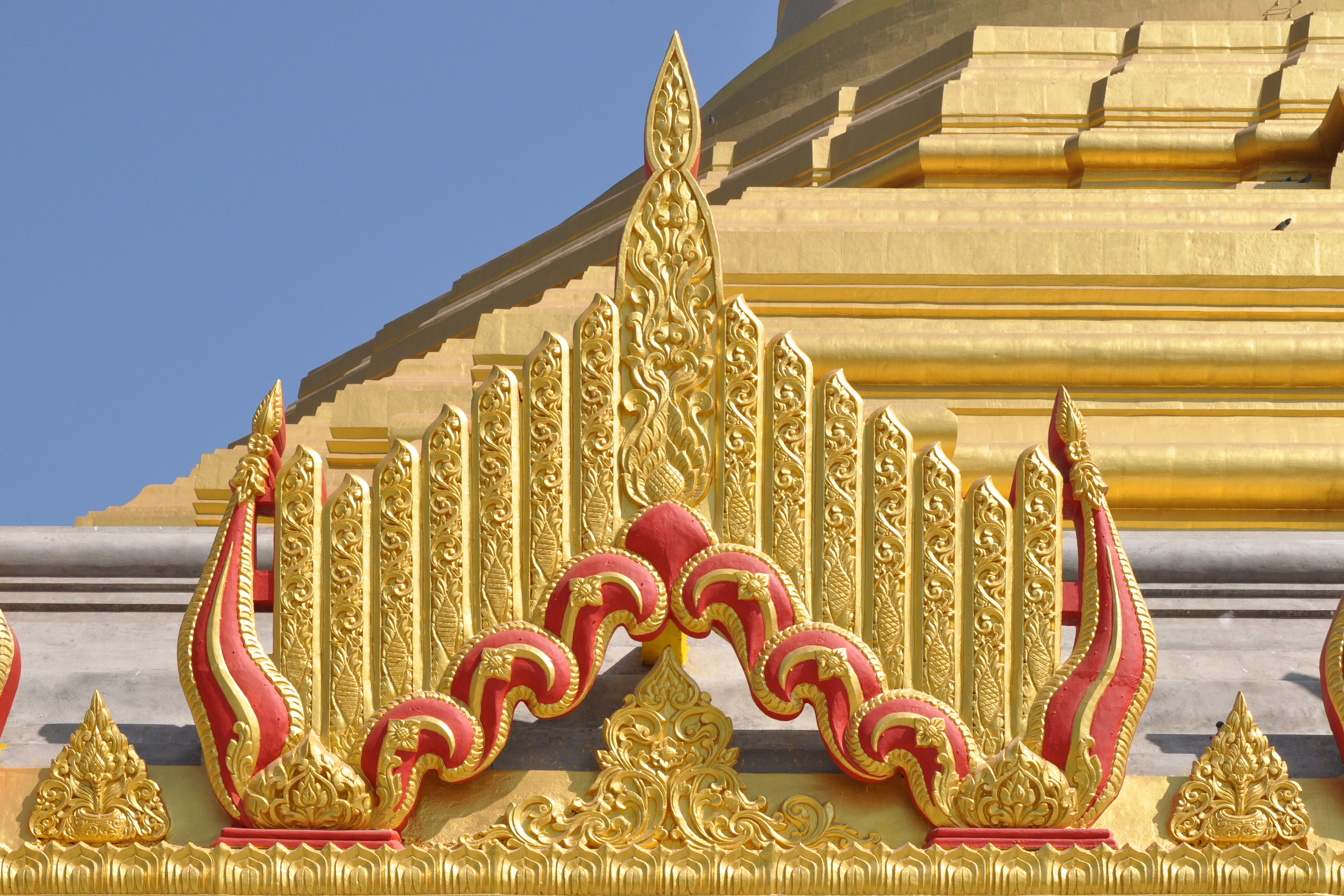
Motif on Global Vipassana Pagoda

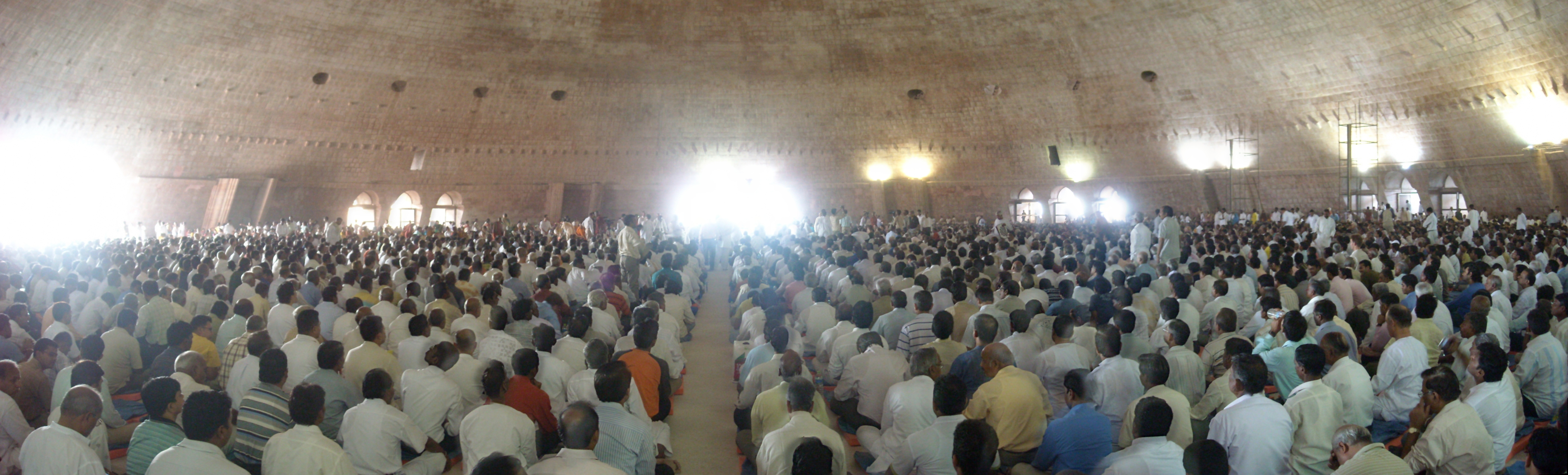
Meditators seated inside the Global Pagoda dome

== See also ==
- Satipatthana Sutta
- Vipassanā
- Ledi Sayadaw
- Webu Sayadaw
- Sayagyi U Ba Khin
- Vipassana Movement
- Doing Time, Doing Vipassana
- The Dhamma Brothers
- Cetiya
- Burmese pagoda
- Buddha statue beside the Global Vipassana Pagoda at night.
- The Global Vipassana Pagoda at Gorai, Mumbai, illuminated at night.
