= Dongri Fort =

Building in India

- Mumbai, Maharashtra, India
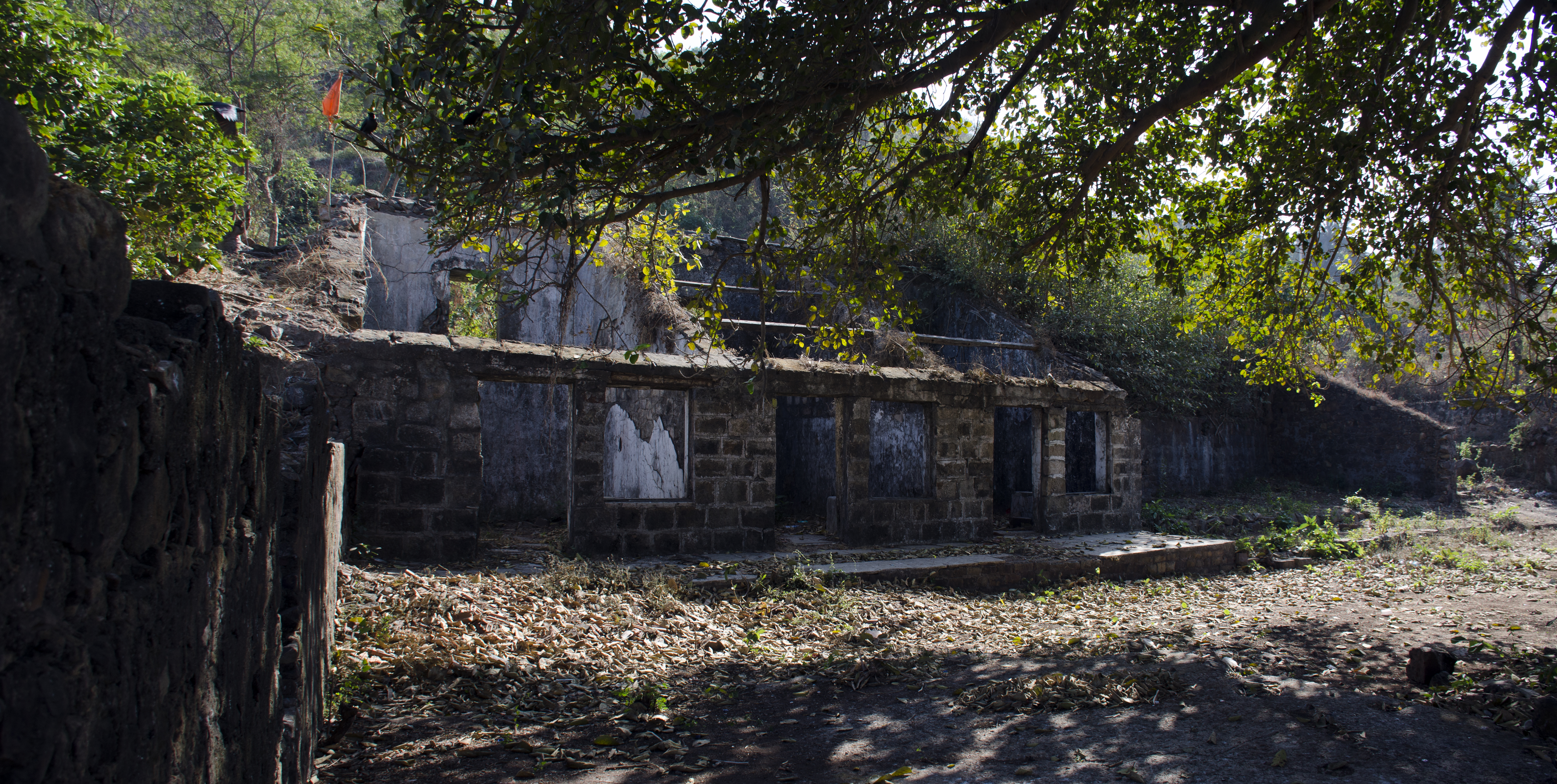
- Dongri Fort

Site information
- Type: Fort

Location
- Shown within Maharashtra Dongri Fort (India)
- Coordinates: 19°18′36.66″N 72°47′36.41″E

The Dongri Fort, or the Dongri Hill Fort, locally known as the Janjire Dhavari Fort, is a fort in Mumbai, India. It is located in the Dongri area. It came under Maratha rule in 1739. Since then, the locals and the church have been looking after the maintenance of the fort, which was once repaired. Every year, during the month of October, the feast of Our Lady of Fatima is celebrated there. Many people from far-off villages come to offer their prayers there. One can take a 360-degree view of the surroundings from this fort, with the Arabian Sea to the west, the Vasai Fort to the north, the Sanjay Gandhi National Park to the east, and the Essel World and Water Kingdom to the south.

== History ==
The Dongri Fort was originally built by the Portuguese around 1701 as part of their defenses after conquering Vasai (Bassein) and the northern Konkan coast. According to regional histories, the Portuguese realized the Dongri’s strategic importance after taking Vasai Fort, and so constructed the "Dongri Fort" (locally called Dharavi Fort) on the hilltop to guard the approach. It thus formed one link in the chain of coastal forts held by the Estado da Índia (Portuguese India). During the 1730s, the fort repeatedly changed hands in conflicts between the Portuguese and the rising Maratha Empire. Maratha general Chimaji Appa led the first capture of Dongri Fort during his campaign against Vasai (then the Portuguese capital) in 1737. The Portuguese governor (viceroy) quickly counterattacked in May 1737 under a new commander (Viceroy D. Joaquim Jose da Cunha, nicknamed “Kadin”), retaking the fort from the Marathas. Intense skirmishing around Vasai and its satellite forts continued through 1738, but ultimately, the Marathas prevailed. By 1739, Dongri Fort was again in Maratha hands and formally fell under Peshwa sovereignty. The capture of Vasai and its fort network (including Dongri) ended Portuguese control of Salsette and the northern islands.

== See also ==
- List of forts in Maharashtra
