= Uttan =

- town
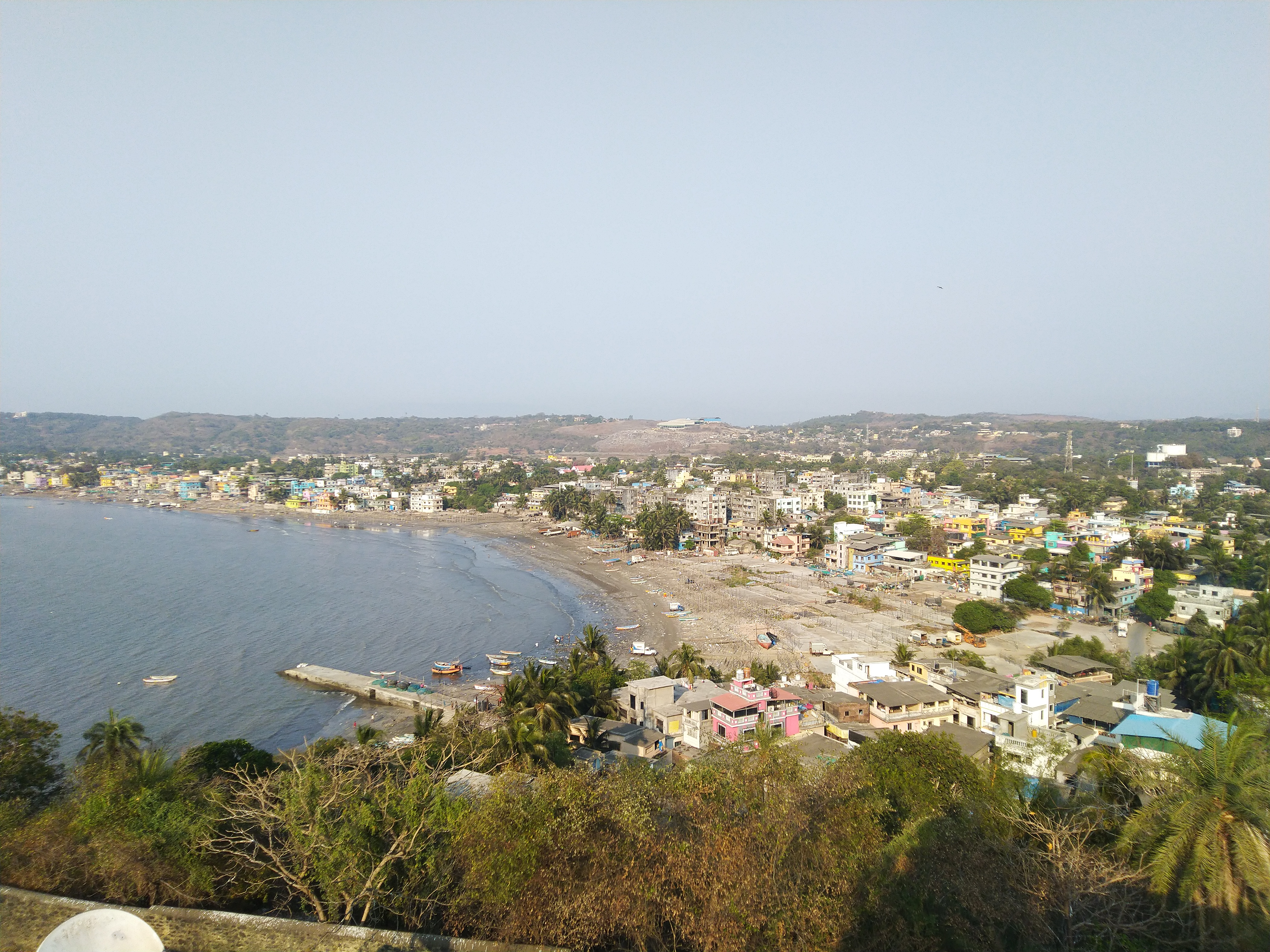
- Uttan Beach in Uttan

- Location in Mumbai, Maharashtra, India Location in Maharashtra, India
- Coordinates: 19.280°N 72.785°E
- Country: India
- State: Maharashtra
- District: Thane
- City: Mira-Bhayandar

Government
  - Type: Municipal Corporation
  - Body: Mira-Bhayandar Municipal Corporation
- Elevation: 6 m (20 ft)

Languages
  - Official: Marathi
- Time zone: UTC+5:30 (IST)
- PIN: 401106
- Telephone code: 022
- Vehicle registration: MH-58

Uttan (Marathi: [utːən]) is a coastal town just north of Mumbai in the Thane district of Maharashtra, India. A coastal town, it falls under the jurisdiction of the Mira-Bhayandar Municipal Corporation. Part of the jurisdiction is also handed over to the Mumbai Meteropolitan Region Development Authority (MMRDA). Uttan is located 8 km away from Bhayandar. Its population consists of mainly East Indian Catholics. Its inhabitants are mostly farmers and fishermen. Uttan also has various resorts and tourists mainly on Valenkanni Beach.

Some of the recreational places closest to Uttan are:

- Dharavi mata mandir, Tarodi village, Uttan
- Essel World and Water Kingdom
- Keshav Srushti
- Global Vipassana Pagoda
