= Geeta Bharat Jain =

Indian politician

Geeta Jain
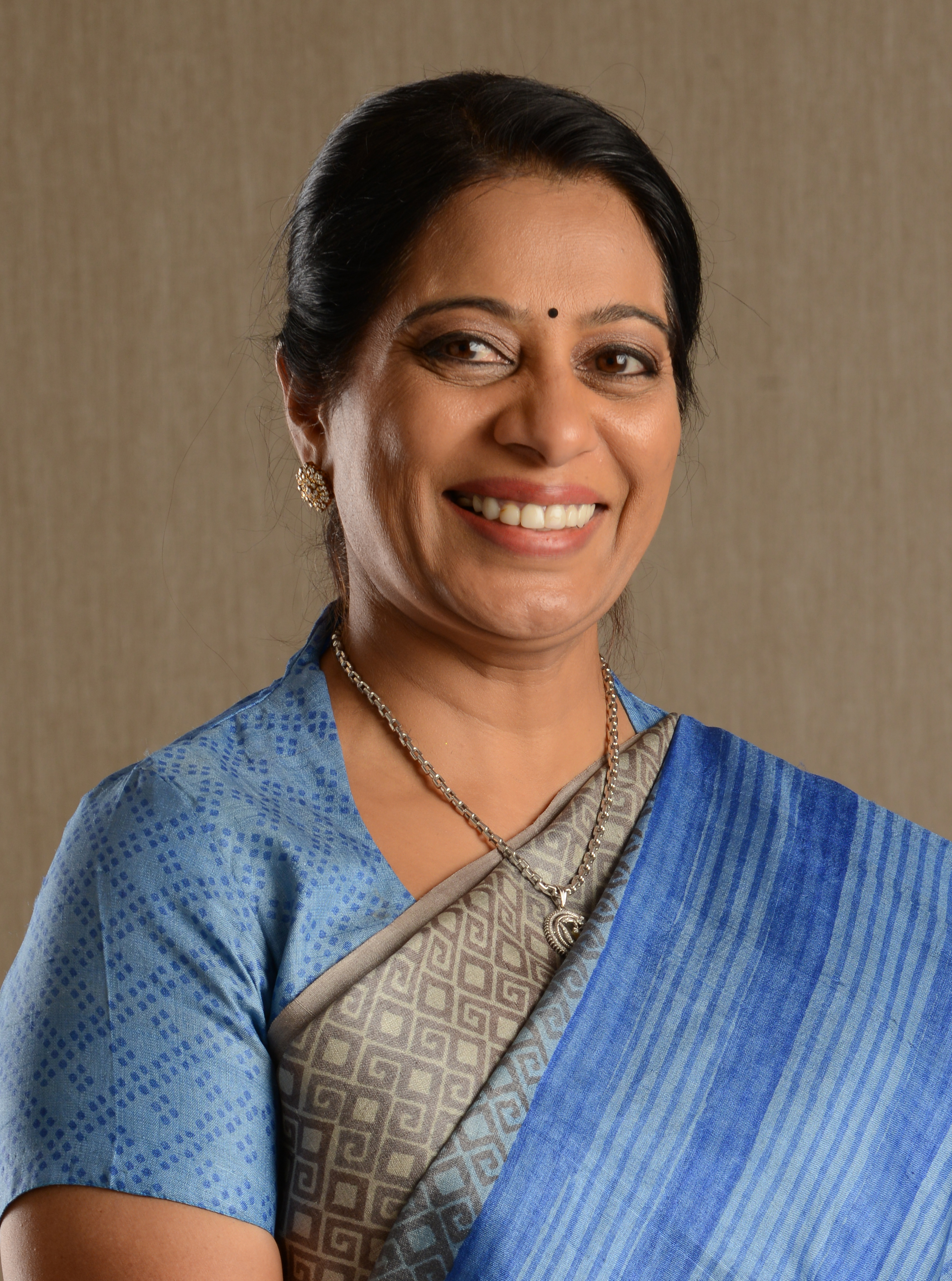

Member of Maharashtra Legislative Assembly
- In office 2019–2024
- Succeeded by: Narender Mehta
- Constituency: Mira Bhayandar

Mayor of Mira-Bhayandar Municipal Corporation
- In office 2015–2017

Personal details
- Born: 5 July 1964 (age 62)
- Other political affiliations: Shiv Sena (2020-2022)

Geeta Bharat Jain (born 5 July 1964) is an Indian politician representing the Bharatiya Janata Party. She won an election as an independent candidate and subsequently gave support to the Shiv Sena-led government. After a year, she joined the Shiv Sena. She is a member of the 14th Maharashtra Legislative Assembly from Mira Bhayandar constituency. She served as a Mayor of the city of Mira-Bhayandar from February 2015 to August 2017. On June 22, 2022, she publicly extended her support to the Bharatiya Janata Party (BJP).

== Early life ==
Jain was born in a Marwari Speaking family in Mumbai and raised in the Mumbai suburb of Andheri. She graduated from PVT Polytechnic College, Mumbai with a Diploma of Medical Laboratory Technology in 1984. Jain was the elder sister among three siblings. Her father ran a retail cloth shop at Jogeshwari.

After completing her schooling at M.A. High School, Andheri, she completed her secondary studies at Bhavans College, Mumbai. Jain also attended PVT Polytechnic College, Santacruz, Mumbai to pursue the Diploma of Medical Laboratory Technology (D.M.L.T.)

== Personal life ==
In August 1984 she married Bharat Jain. They have two daughters.

== Positions held ==
- 2002: Elected as corporator in Mira-Bhayandar Municipal Corporation (1st term)
- 2012: Re-Elected as corporator in Mira-Bhayandar Municipal Corporation (2nd term)
- 2015: Elected as mayor of Mira-Bhayandar Municipal Corporation
- 2017: Re-Elected as corporator in Mira-Bhayandar Municipal Corporation (3rd term)
- 2019: Elected as member of Maharashtra Legislative Assembly from Mira Bhayandar
