= Gorai =

Village in Maharashtra

- Suburb
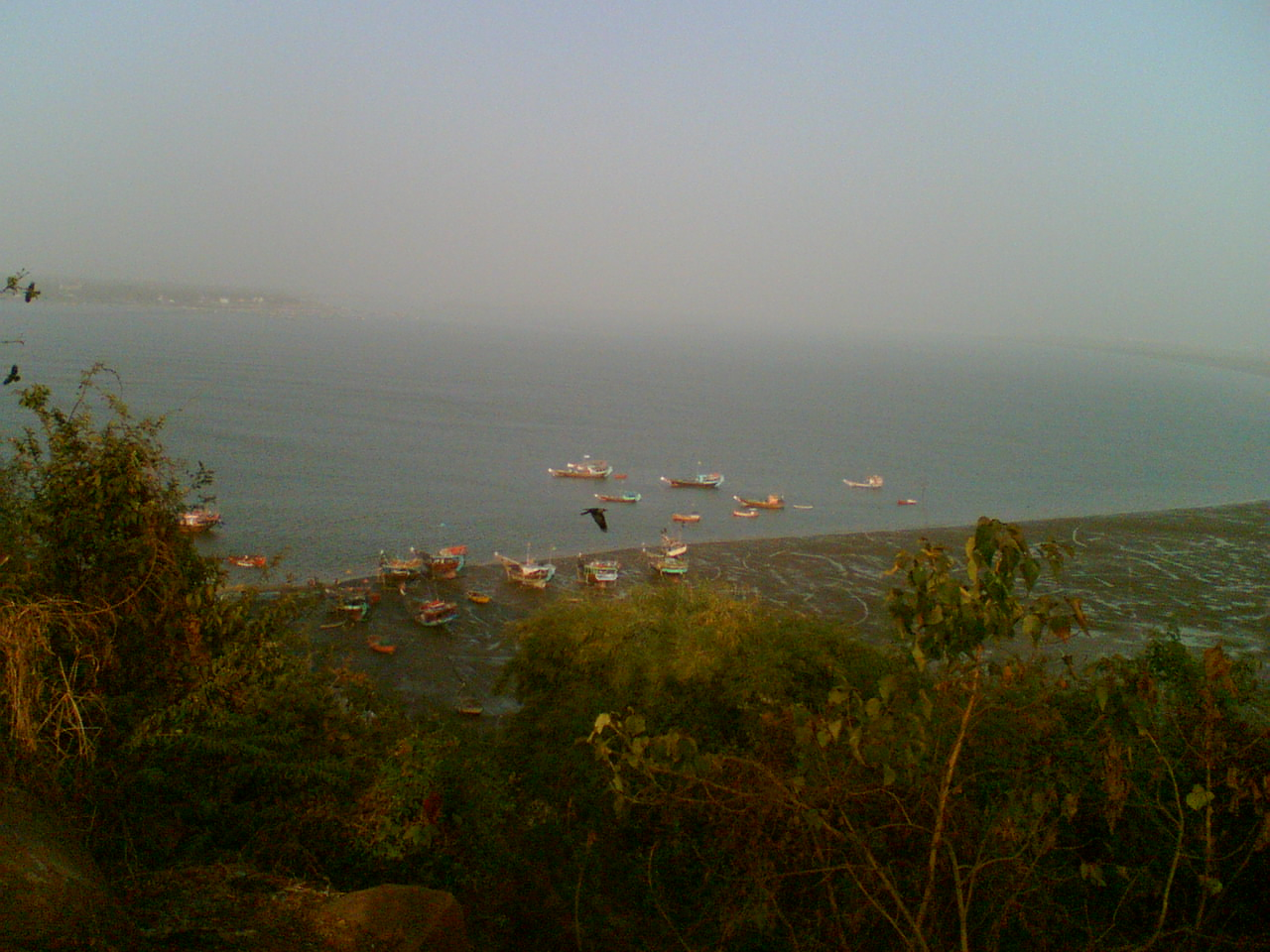
- Fishing boats near Gorai

- Location within Mumbai
- Coordinates: 19°14′27″N 72°46′55″E
- Country: India
- State: Maharashtra
- District: Mumbai Suburban
- City: Mumbai

Government
  - Type: Municipal Corporation
  - Body: Brihanmumbai Municipal Corporation (MCGM)

Languages
  - Official: Marathi
- Time zone: UTC+5:30 (IST)
- Area code: 022
- Civic agency: BMC

Gorai ([ɡoɾaːi]) is a village at the Dharavi Bhet, in the Mumbai Suburban district, India. It is located on the north-western part of the island of Salsette. Gorai is accessed either by a ferry crossing the Manori Creek and the Gorai Creek, or by the overland route through Bhayander. Gorai is bordered by the villages of Manori and Uttan, Pali, Chowk, Dongri, Tarodi, Rai, Morva, and Murdhe.

Marathi is the most spoken language in this region. The East Indian community, Panchkalshi or Somvanshi Kshatriya Pathare (SKP), and the Koli are the native people of this area.

Prior to the 1980s, Gorai was characterized by its beaches and palm groves. While rising pollution levels in the Arabian Sea near Mumbai have impacted water quality, Gorai remains less polluted than nearby urban beaches. The village retains a rural character, with bullock carts remaining in use alongside ongoing freshwater shortage. However, expanding real estate development in the area has led to structural and demographic changes within the local community.

The Essel World, the first and the biggest amusement park of India, was built in Gorai in 1986. The park has several rides that cater to all age groups, and is known for its colossal infrastructure. The Global Vipassana Pagoda, featuring the tallest pillar-less dome in the world, a place for meditation, is built on 13 acres of land near Gorai. It is similar in shape to the Shwedagon Pagoda in Yangon, Myanmar.

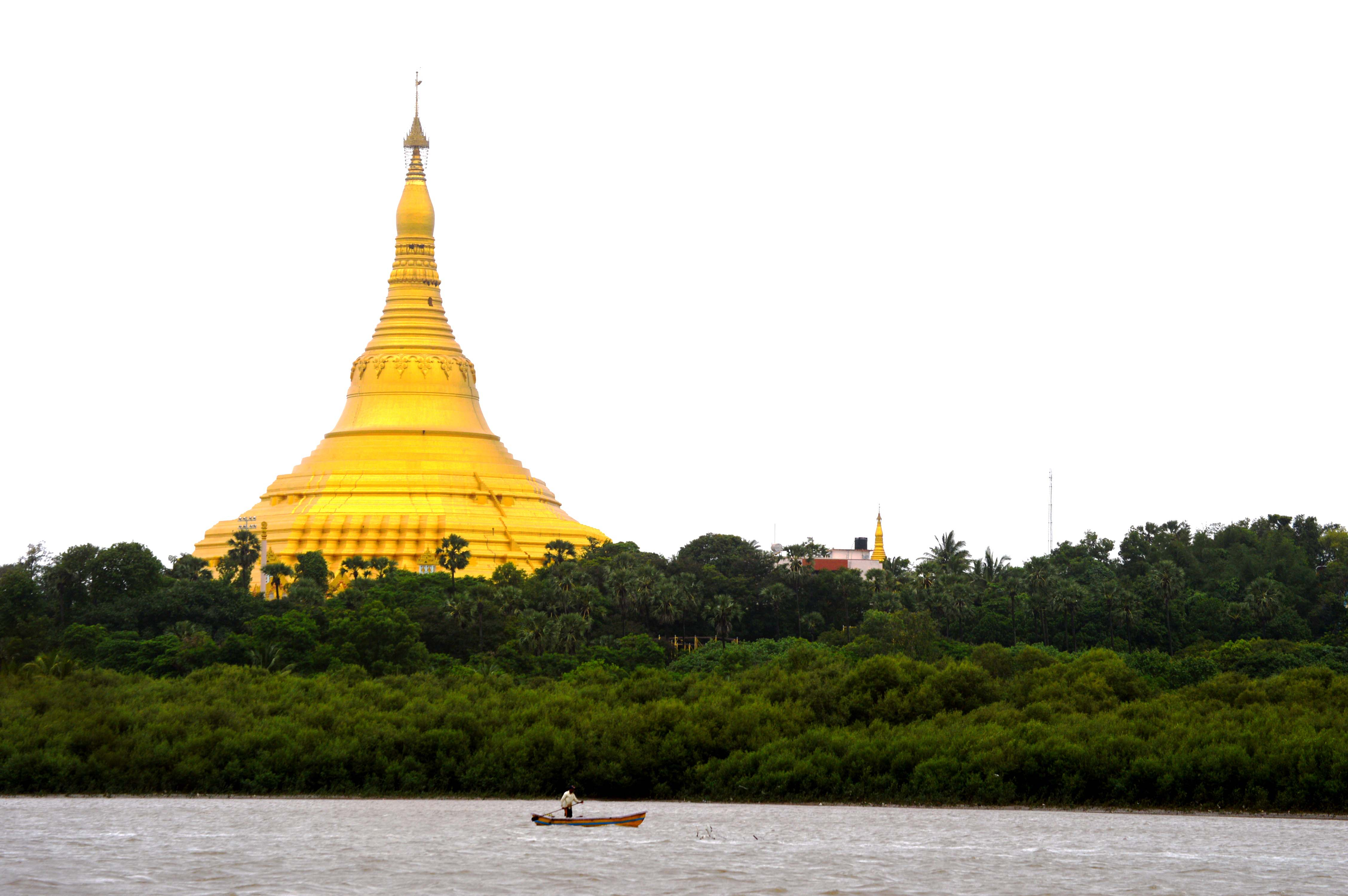
The Global Vipassana Pagoda

== Dharavi Island ==
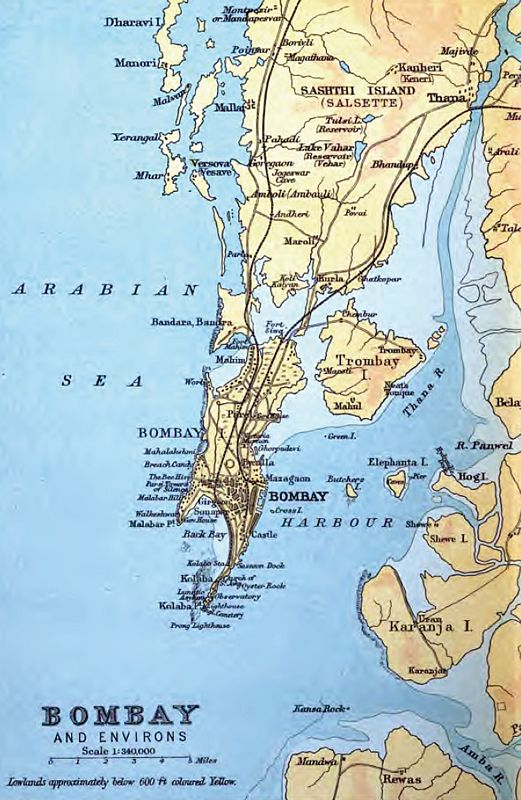
1893 map of Salsette Island showing Dharavi Island at top Left corner

The peninsula protruding off the north-west of Salsette island known as Dharavi Bhet once used to be an island called Dharavi, part of a group of Islands off the Salsette coast separated by the Manori Creek that connected to the Vasai Creek. Versova, Marve and Rai Murdhe were the names of the other islands. These islands remained separate till as late as 1825 when

Col. Jervis's map showed the west coast of Salsette broken into eight large and four small islands. In 1882, one could walk across the tidal inlets during low tides to reach these islands. The island of Dharavi, however, had to be reached by a boat. However, with the building of the railways over the Ghodbunder Creek, and with successive urbanization and reclamation of the tidal inlets, the Island is now effectively a peninsula attached to Salsette Island. North Dharavi Island which falls in the Thane district while the south is included in the Mumbai Suburban district.

== Portuguese history ==
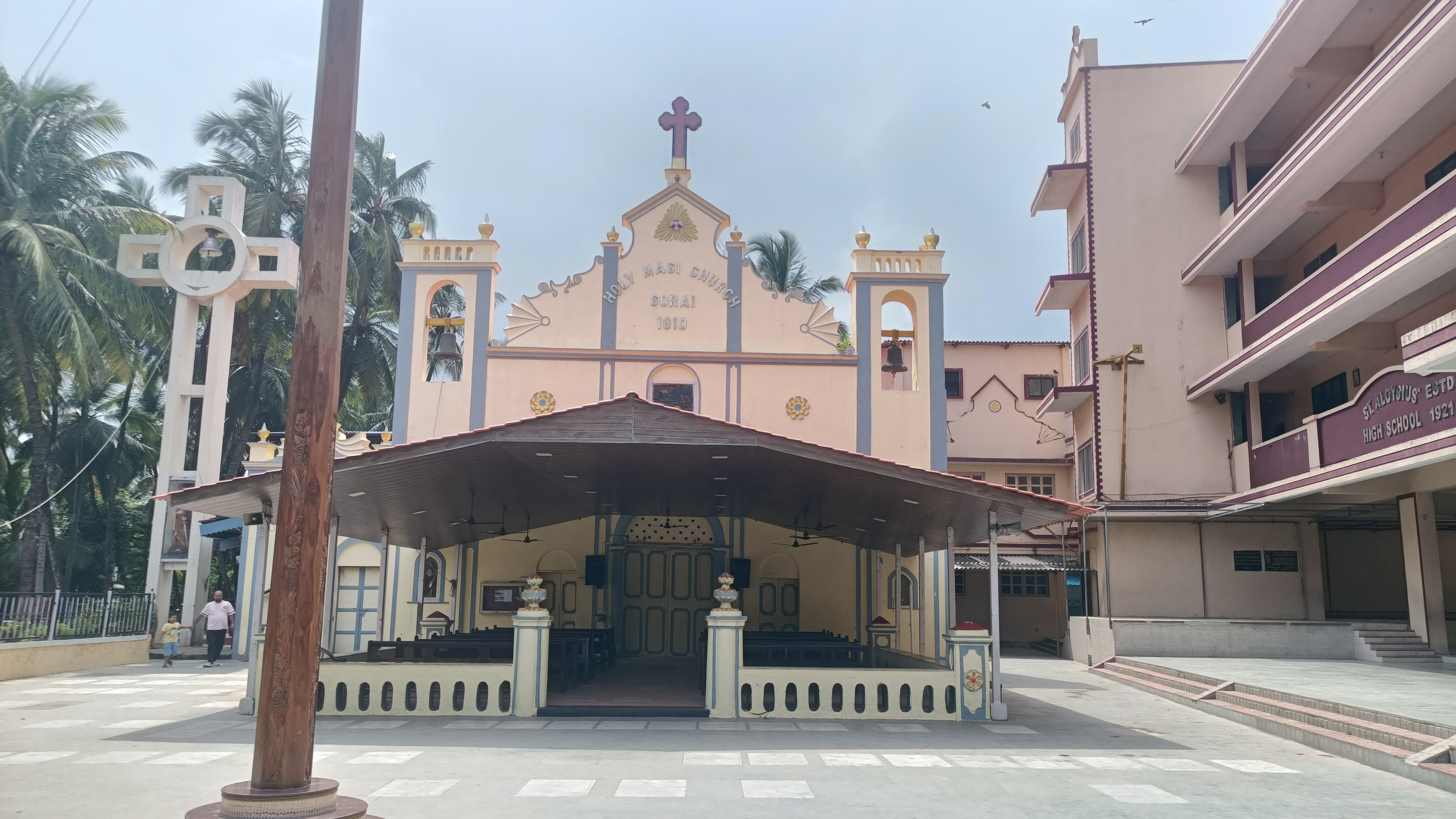
Holy Magi Church - Gorai Village

Gorai has a large East Indian population. East Indians are Roman Catholics who were converted by the Portuguese when they arrived here in the 16th century. Gorai has three churches. The oldest one, Reis Magos or The Three Magi, on the banks of the Vairalla Tank, located on the northern border of Gorai, was built by the Franciscan missionaries between 1595 and 1602. The newer parish church, also named after the Three Magi, was built in 1810, and is located about three-quarters of a mile to the south of the ruined, original parish church. The third is the Infant Jesus Chapel, built near the ruins of the old church. The Church of Holy Magi was built in 1810 in Gorai.

== Major issues facing Gorai ==
=== Ecological degradation ===
Coastal waters off Mumbai are rising at 0.3 degrees per decade. The sea level of the Mumbai coast is rising at an average of 1.2 mm a year. In Manori and Gorai together, the average annual fish catch dropped from 18,400 tonnes for the five-year period from 1994-95 to 98-99 to 13,354 tonnes for the period 2004-05 to 2008-09.

=== Toxic waste dumping ===
Villagers of Uttan, Palkhadi, Talavli, Anandnagar, Dongri, Tarodi, Pali, Chowk and Morva are protesting against the operators of dumping grounds sitting atop the Dhavgi Hill right in the center of the nine villages. This dumping ground is set up on Collectors land that was transferred to the Mira Bhayander Municipal Corporation who in turn has leased it for a period of 30 years to a private garbage disposal company. Though the civic body claims to spray chemicals to keep away the stink, villagers say that the foul smell is getting unbearable and leading to health issues among the residents.
