= Narendra Mehta =

Indian politician

Member of the Maharashtra Legislative Assembly
- Incumbent
- Assumed office 2024

Personal details
- Born: 25 September 1972 (age 54) Desuri, Rajasthan, India
- Party: Bharatiya Janata Party
- Spouse: Suman Mehta
- Children: 2
- Education: Our Lady of Nazareth High School
- Occupation: Politician
- Website: narendralmehta.com

Narendra Mehta (born 25 September 1972) is an Indian politician. He is a member of the Bharatiya Janata Party. He serves in the Maharashtra Legislative Assembly. Mehta represents the Mira Bhayandar constituency.

== Personal life ==
Mehta was born in a Marwadi middle-class family on 25 September 1972. A school dropout of 8th standard, Mehta went on to enter politics and become the mayor of Mira-Bhayander Municipal corporation.

== Political career ==
His efforts, alongside those of other political leaders, have been focused on enhancing connectivity and easing transportation woes for residents.

The Metro 9 line, which will connect Dahisar to Bhayandar, is part of a broader initiative to improve public transportation in Mumbai. The project, which began construction nine months after Prime Minister Narendra Modi laid the foundation stone, is expected to significantly reduce travel time and congestion in the area. This 10.40 km-long elevated corridor will feature nine stations and is being developed by the Mumbai Metropolitan Region Development Authority (MMRDA).

Mehta's advocacy for the metro project highlights his commitment to the development and modernization of Mira Bhayandar, aiming to transform the region into a more accessible and commuter-friendly area.

== Controversies ==
Mehta has been embroiled in multiple controversies, including allegations of harassment, rape, corruption, and illegal environmental encroachments.

=== Harassment of BJP corporator Neela Soans ===
In February 2020, BJP corporator Neela Soans from Mira-Bhayander accused fellow party member and former MLA Mehta of harassment and exploitation. According to her allegations, Mehta threatened her for refusing to follow his directives, which she claimed were unethical. Soans reported that she faced continuous mental harassment and was pressured to act against her principles, ultimately compromising her integrity and role as a corporator.

=== Rape and sexual assault charges ===
In February 2020, a BJP corporator from Mira Road filed a rape case against Mehta. The allegations included sexual assault and harassment, leading to significant media coverage and controversy within the party. The case added to the ongoing scrutiny of political figures and their conduct.

=== Corruption charges ===
Mehta faced allegations of corruption and possession of disproportionate assets amounting to Rs 8 crore. A Thane court criticized Mehta for what it deemed a "mischievous" complaint in the corruption case. This has led to significant scrutiny and legal action against Mehta, implicating him in a high-profile scandal.

=== Illegal hacking of mangroves ===
The illegal hacking of mangroves by a Mumbai BJP MLA involved the alleged conversion of 3.5 acres of mangrove land into a club. This act prompted legal action, with a case being filed against Mehta, and subsequently shifted to the Economic Offences Wing (EOW). The incident highlights the environmental concerns and legal repercussions associated with encroachments on mangrove ecosystems.

=== Lamborghini accident ===
A Lamborghini accident involving the son of a former BJP MLA raised concerns about rash driving and potential misuse of political influence. Critics argue that the incident underscores issues of privilege and irresponsible behavior among the political elite. This incident sparked debates about accountability and justice, particularly in cases involving individuals with political connections.

=== 1.5 kg of gold and other diamond jewellery ===
This controversy surrounding Mehta revolved around allegations of amassing disproportionate assets. In May 2022, the Anti-Corruption Bureau (ACB) discovered a Lamborghini, 1.5 kg of gold, and diamond jewellery at his residence. This discovery raised suspicions regarding the source of his wealth, leading to his arrest and subsequent rejection of bail in June 2022.

=== Disproportionate assets of more than Rs. 8.25 crore ===
In 2022, Mehta and his wife came under scrutiny for allegedly possessing disproportionate assets exceeding Rs. 8.25 crore. This led to investigations by the Anti-Corruption Bureau (ACB) in Thane. The controversy emerged from allegations of their assets being significantly disproportionate to their known sources of income.

== Career ==
Mehta entered politics in 1997. He was a member of the municipal corporation and later went on to become the Mayor. As a businessman, Mehta is into several businesses, including construction, education and healthcare. In 2002, he was arrested in relation to a corruption charge. Later, after a 14-year legal battle in 2016, he was acquitted of all charges by the court after the prosecution failed to produce evidence beyond doubt in the court. In 2017, there was a buzz when he gifted his wife, Suman, an expensive luxury car on her birthday. Mehta again found himself at the center of political attention after Mrs Mehta hit the car into an auto while driving. Fortunately, no one was hurt in the incident.

Later again in 2017, Mehta and five Mira Bhayander Municipal Corporation officers were booked in a Rs 2 Crore extortion case against a builder. The case is currently under investigation.

On 28 February, he and 200 others were booked for rioting in Thane four days earlier. Mehta and the other rioters had staged a protest in front of a local police station and then moved to the home of Vasant Mane, where Mehta threatened him and his family. Mehta and the rioters then proceeded to ransack Mane's house. He is also the owner of the Seven Eleven group.

In the 2019 Maharashtra Legislative Assembly election, he lost to Geeta Bharat Jain by about 15,535 votes.

On 24 February 2020, Mehta quit BJP from all posts and also apologized to other party leaders.

== Positions held ==
- Member of the Maharashtra Legislative Assembly
- Terms in office: 2014-2019 and 2024–present.
