= Bhayandar =

- Suburb
- Location in Maharashtra, India Bhayandar (Maharashtra) Bhayandar (India)
- Coordinates: 19.31°N 72.85°E
- Country: India
- State: Maharashtra
- Region: Mumbai
- District: Thane

Government
  - Type: Municipal Corporation
  - Body: Mira-Bhayandar Municipal Corporation
  - Mayor: Dimple Mehta
  - Municipal Commissioner: Radhabinod Aribam Sharma

Area
  - Total: 79.4 km^{2} (30.7 sq mi)

Language
  - Official: Marathi
- Time zone: UTC+5:30 (IST)
- PIN: Bhayandar (West) - 401101 Bhayandar (East) - 401104, 401105
- Telephone code: 022
- Vehicle registration: MH 58 - Thane
- Website: www.mbmc.gov.in

Bhayandar, also spelled as Bhaindar or Bhayander, is a suburb located in the western suburbs of Mumbai and the northern most suburb of the island on the western side, near the Vasai Creek. It has a large Marathi, Aagri, Koli, and mixed-community population. It falls under the North Central ward of the Municipal Corporation and comes under police jurisdiction of Mira-Bhayander, Vasai-Virar Police Commissionerate.

== Geography ==
Bhayander is located on the northern portion of the Salsette Island, and at the northern part of the Konkan region. Bhayandar comes under the jurisdiction of the Mira Bhayandar Municipal Corporation. The entire Mira-Bhayandar region lies just outside the Mumbai Suburban district, and officially belongs to the Thane district, despite being closer to the island of Mumbai. The Mira-Bhayandar region comprises an area of 79 km^{2}. A vast creek divides the Mumbai suburban zones (in which Bhayander falls) and Vasai-Virar. In the north lies the Vasai Creek, to the east the Sanjay Gandhi National Park, and the Uttan coast to the west. It mainly is of Deccan lava terrain, and consists of waterlogged and marshy areas. The climate is tropical, wet, and dry.

== Transport ==
Bhayandar railway station is a railway station on the Western line of the Mumbai Suburban Railway network. The platform has access to all stations from Churchgate to Virar.
