= Mira-Bhayandar Municipal Corporation =

Local civic body in Mira-Bhayandar, Maharashtra, India

Type
- Type: Municipal Corporation of the Mira-Bhayandar

Leadership
- Mayor: Dimple Mehta, BJP
- Deputy Mayor: Dhruvkishor Patil, BJP
- Municipal Commissioner: Radhabinod Sharma, IAS

Structure
- Seats: 95
- Political groups: Government (78): BJP (78); Opposition (17): INC (13); SHS (3); IND (1)

Elections
- Last election: 15 January 2026
- Next election: 2031

Website
- www.mbmc.gov.in/en

The Mira-Bhayandar Municipal Corporation is the governing body of the city of Mira-Bhayandar in the Indian state of Maharashtra. It consists of democratically elected members, headed by a mayor who administers the city's infrastructure, public services and police. Members of the state's leading political parties hold elected offices in the corporation.

== History ==
The municipal corporation is in Bhayandar. Municipal Corporation mechanism in India was introduced during British Rule with formation of municipal corporation in Madras (Chennai) in 1688, later followed by municipal corporations in Bombay (Mumbai) and Calcutta (Kolkata) by 1762. Mira-Bhayandar Municipal Corporation is headed by Mayor of city and governed by Commissioner. Mira-Bhayandar Municipal Corporation has been formed with functions to improve the infrastructure of town. The Mira-Bhayandar Municipal Corporation (MBMC) is the civic body governing the city of Mira-Bhayandar in the Indian state of Maharashtra. It consists of democratically elected members and is headed by a Mayor who oversees the administration of city infrastructure, public services, and municipal governance. Members of major political parties hold elected offices in the corporation.

Geographical Significance

Total Area: 79.4 sq. km

Boundaries:

- East: Sanjay Gandhi National Park
- West: Arabian Sea
- North: Vasai-Virar region
- South: Borivali, Mumbai

Mira-Bhayandar has a coastal ecosystem with extensive mangrove forests and tidal creeks, making it an ecologically sensitive zone.

== Revenue sources ==
The following are the Income sources for the Corporation from the Central and State Government.

=== Revenue from taxes ===
Following is the Tax related revenue for the corporation.

- Property tax.
- Profession tax.
- Entertainment tax.
- Grants from Central and State Government like Goods and Services Tax.
- Advertisement tax.

=== Revenue from non-tax sources ===
Following is the Non Tax related revenue for the corporation.

- Water usage charges.
- Fees from Documentation services.
- Rent received from municipal property.
- Funds from municipal bonds.

== Election results ==
=== 2026 results ===
Party	Seats	+/-
Bharatiya Janata Party (BJP)	78	▲17
Shiv Sena (SHS)	3	▼19
Indian National Congress (INC)	13	▲3
Independents (Ind)	1	▼1
Total	95	

=== 2017 results ===
Party	Seats	+/-
Bharatiya Janata Party (BJP)	61	▲32
Shiv Sena (SHS)	22	▲8
Indian National Congress (INC)	10	▼9
Independents (Ind)	2	▼1
Total	95	

=== 2012 results ===
Party	Seats
Bharatiya Janata Party (BJP)	29
Nationalist Congress Party (NCP)	27
Indian National Congress (INC)	19
Shiv Sena (SHS)	14
Maharashtra Navnirman Sena (MNS)	1
Other regd. parties	3
Independents (Ind)	1
Total	94

=== List of mayors ===
#	Name	Term			Election	Party
1	Myra Mendonca	28 August 2002	27 February 2005	2 years, 183 days	2002	Nationalist Congress Party
2	Nirmala Savle	28 February 2005	27 August 2007	2 years, 180 days	2002	Nationalist Congress Party
3	Narendra Mehta	28 August 2007	27 February 2010	2 years, 183 days	2007	Independent
4	Tulsidas Mhatre	28 February 2010	27 August 2012	2 years, 181 days	2007	Indian National Congress
5	Caitlin Pereira	28 August 2012	27 February 2015	2 years, 183 days	2012	Nationalist Congress Party
6	Geeta Jain	28 February 2015	27 August 2017	2 years, 180 days	2012	Bharatiya Janata Party
7	Dimple Vinod Mehta	28 August 2017	27 February 2020	2 years, 183 days	2017	Bharatiya Janata Party
8	Jyotsna Hasnale	28 February 2020	27 August 2022	2 years, 180 days	2017	Bharatiya Janata Party
(7)	Dimple Vinod Mehta	03 February 2026	Incumbent	21 days	2026	Bharatiya Janata Party

=== List of deputy mayors ===
Steven John Mendonca - 2007-2012 Dhruvkishor Patil - 2026- present

== List of Municipal Commissioners ==
The first Municipal Commissioner of MBMC was Shri Shivmurti Naik. The following table lists the Municipal Commissioners who have served in MBMC:

Municipal Commissioners of MBMC
Sr. No.	Commissioner's Name	Term Duration
1	Shri Radhabinod A. Sharma (IAS)	07-03-2025 – Present
2	Shri Sanjay Shripatrao Katkar (IAS)	09-08-2023 – 07-03-2025
3	Shri Dilip Dhole	03-03-2021 – 09-08-2023
4	Dr. Vijay Rathod (IAS)	25-06-2020 – 03-03-2021
5	Shri Chandrakant Dange (IAS)	15-02-2020 – 25-06-2020
6	Shri Balaji Khatgaonkar	04-05-2018 – 15-02-2020
7	Shri B. G. Pawar (IAS)	09-02-2018 – 04-05-2018
8	Dr. Naresh Gite (IAS)	16-08-2016 – 06-02-2018
9	Shri Achyut Hange	21-02-2015 – 16-08-2016
10	Shri Subhash Lakhe	23-07-2014 – 21-02-2015
11	Shri Suresh Kakani (IAS)	16-12-2013 – 23-07-2014
12	Shri Bharat Shitole (Additional Charge)	18-10-2013 – 16-12-2013
13	Shri Suresh Kakani (IAS)	28-01-2013 – 18-10-2013
14	Shri Vikram Kumar (IAS)	12-07-2011 – 28-01-2013
15	Shri Sudhir Raut (Additional Charge)	01-06-2011 – 11-07-2011
16	Shri Shivmurti Naik	24-02-2009 – 31-05-2011
17	Shri Rajiv R. Jadhav (IAS)	18-03-2008 – 23-02-2009
18	Shri R. D. Shinde (IAS)	01-01-2008 – 17-03-2008
19	Shri Sudamrao Gaikwad	12-08-2005 – 31-12-2007
20	Shri R. D. Shinde (IAS)	02-12-2002 – 11-08-2005
21	Shri Shivmurti Naik (First Municipal Commissioner)	28-02-2002 – 01-12-2002

== List of Municipal Health Centers ==
Sr. No.	Health Center Name	Location
1	Uttan Health Center	Chikkal Khadi, Uttan Naka, Bhayandar (W)
2	Murdha Health Center	Murdha Marathi School
3	Bhayandar (W) Health Center	Near Police Station, Bhayandar (W)
4	Vinayak Nagar Health Center	Maharana Pratap Road, Bhayandar (W)
5	Ganesh Deval Nagar Health Center	Shiv Sena Galli, Bhayandar (W)
6	Bandarwadi Health Center	Opp. Bus Depot, Bhayandar (E)
7	Navghar Health Center	Near Hanuman Temple, Navghar Road, Bhayandar (W)
8	Ideal Park Health Center	Opp. Seven Eleven School
9	Mira Road Health Center	Opp. Wockhardt Hospital, Mira Road (E)
10	Penkarpada Health Center	Near Shankar Temple, Mira Road (E)
11	Kashigaon Health Center	Kashigaon, Urdu & Marathi School

== MBMC Schools List ==
1. MBMC School No. 01, Uttan (Marathi)
2. MBMC School No. 02, Uttan (Urdu)
3. MBMC School No. 03, Kajupada
4. MBMC School No. 04, Kashimira (Marathi)
5. MBMC School No. 05, Kashi (Urdu)
6. MBMC School No. 06, Khari (Marathi)
7. MBMC School No. 07, Khari (Gujarati)
8. MBMC School No. 08, Goddev (Marathi)
9. MBMC School No. 09, Ghodbunder
10. MBMC School No. 10, Chene
11. MBMC School No. 11, Chowk (Marathi)
12. MBMC School No. 12, Dongarpali (Marathi)
13. MBMC School No. 13, Navghar (Marathi)
14. MBMC School No. 14, Penkarpada
15. MBMC School No. 15, Bandarwadi (Marathi)
16. MBMC School No. 16, Bhayandar (Marathi)
17. MBMC School No. 17, Bhayandar (Gujarati)
18. MBMC School No. 18, Bhayandar (Hindi)
19. MBMC School No. 19, Mashacha Pada
20. MBMC School No. 20, Mire (Marathi)
21. MBMC School No. 21, Mire (Gujarati)
22. MBMC School No. 22, Murda (Marathi)
23. MBMC School No. 23, Murda Khadi (Gujarati)
24. MBMC School No. 24, Morva (Marathi)
25. MBMC School No. 25, Rai (Marathi)
26. MBMC School No. 26, Rai (Gujarati)
27. MBMC School No. 27, Retibandar (Marathi)
28. MBMC School No. 28, Varsova (Marathi)
29. MBMC School No. 29, Navghar (Hindi)
30. MBMC School No. 30, Bhayandar (Hindi)
31. MBMC School No. 31, Bhayandar (Urdu)
32. MBMC School No. 32, Bharat Ratna Ustad Bismillah Khan (Urdu)
33. MBMC School No. 33, Murda (Hindi)
34. MBMC School No. 34, Mira Road (Urdu)
35. MBMC School No. 35, Dachkulpada
36. MBMC School No. 36, Bandarwadi (Hindi)

=== MBMC Major Libraries ===
1. Nagar Bhavan Library, Dr. Babasaheb Ambedkar Bhavan, Second Floor, Near Mandali Lake, Bhayandar (West).
2. Ward Committee Office No. 03, Library, Talav Road, Bhayandar (East).
3. Rashtrapita Mahatma Gandhi Library, Indira Gandhi Hospital, Poonam Sagar Complex, Mira Road (East).

=== MBMC Study Centers ===
1. Dr. Babasaheb Ambedkar Bhavan, Second & Third Floor, Near Mandali Lake, Bhayandar (West).
2. Reservation No. 100 Study Room, First Floor & Second Floor, Virangula Kendra, Bhayandar (West).
3. Ganesh Deval Nagar Study Room, Bhayandar (West).
4. Uttan Motha Gaon Study Room, Bhayandar (West).
5. Ward Office No. 03 Library & Study Room, Second & Third Floor, Talav Road, Bhayandar (West).
6. Jesal Park Study Room, Bhayandar (East).
7. Savitribai Phule Study Room, Ground Floor, Near Yashwant Garden, Bhayandar (East).
8. Hanuman Nagar Library & Study Room, Ground Floor & First Floor, Hanuman Nagar, Bhayandar (East).
9. Rashtrapita Mahatma Gandhi Library & Study Room, Second Floor, Mira Road (East).
10. Amenity Open Space Study Room, First Floor, Poonam Garden, Mira Road (East).

Study Center Timings: 7:00 AM – 11:00 PM

== MBMT Transport Services ==
Operational Buses

- Weekdays: 107 buses
- Saturdays: 106 buses
- Sundays & Holidays: 81 buses
- Total Buses: 131 buses (74 Diesel + 57 E-buses)

=== MBMT Major Routes ===
Sr. No.	Bus Route No.	Bus Route Name
1	1	Bhayandar Station (W) to Chowk
2	2	Bhayandar Station (W) to Uttan Naka
3	4	Bhayandar Station (W) to Excel World
4	5	Bhayandar Station (W) to Kashimira
5	6	Uttan Naka to Manori Tar
6	10	Bhayandar Station (W) to Thane Station (E) Kopari via W.E.H. – Majiwada
7	10 AC	Bhayandar Station (W) to Thane Station (E) Kopari via W.E.H. – Majiwada
8	12	Bhayandar Station (E) to K.D. Emp. via Indralok
9	14	Bhayandar Station (E) to National Park via Kashimira & Borivali Station (E)
10	15	Mira Road Station (E) to Godbandar Depot via S.K. Stone, Beverly Park Cinema
11	16	Mira Road Station (E) to Tiwari College via S.K. Stone, Beverly Park Cinema
12	17	Mira Road Station (E) to Vinay Nagar via J.P. Garden City, Pleasant Park
13	18	Western Park to Jogeshwari (W)
14	19	Mira Road Station (E) to JP North City via J.P. Garden City, Pleasant Park
15	20	Bhayandar Station (W) to Mourva
16	21	Mira Road Station (E) to K.D. Emp. via Rasaz Theater, Bharati Park, Shivar Garden
17	22	Mira Road Station (E) to Godbandar Gaon, Modern Company Gate No. 2
18	23	Bhayandar Station (E) to Penkarpada
19	24	Mira Road Station (E) to Western Park via Kashimira
20	25	Mira Road Station (E) to Aaradhya Park
21	27	Mira Road Station (E) to MITL School
22	28	Mira Road Station (E) to Bhayandar Station (E)
23	29	Mira Road Station (E) to Thane Kopari (E)
24	29 AC	Mira Road Station (E) to Thane Kopari (E)
25	30	Mira Road Station (E) to Unique Garden

== Pay & Park Management ==
Major Parking Locations

- Bhayandar (W) Railway Station – 106 two-wheelers
- Star Bazaar (Navghar) – 66 four-wheelers
- Mira Road Railway Station and Nearby Roads – 1346 two-wheelers

Parking Charges

Open Parking Rates (per hour/day/month)

Vehicle Type	6 Hours	12 Hours	24 Hours	Monthly Pass
Bicycle	₹3	₹5	₹10	₹150
Two-Wheeler	₹15	₹20	₹25	₹350
Four-Wheeler	₹50	₹75	₹100	₹1000
Commercial Vehicles Light	₹60	₹100	₹150	₹2000
Heavy Vehicles Truck/Bus	₹70	₹125	₹175	₹4000

Covered Parking Rates (per hour/day/month)

Vehicle Type	6 Hours	12 Hours	24 Hours	Monthly Pass
Two-Wheeler	₹20	₹30	₹40.50	₹800
Four-Wheeler	₹60	₹80	₹100	₹1200
Commercial Vehicles Light	₹60	₹100	₹150	₹2000
