= Mumbai building collapse =

Mumbai building collapse may refer to the following building collapses in Mumbai, India:

- 2013 Mumbai building collapse
- 2022 Mumbai building collapse
