= Parsik Tunnel =

Railway tunnel in India

Coordinates: 19°11′19″N 73°00′55″E

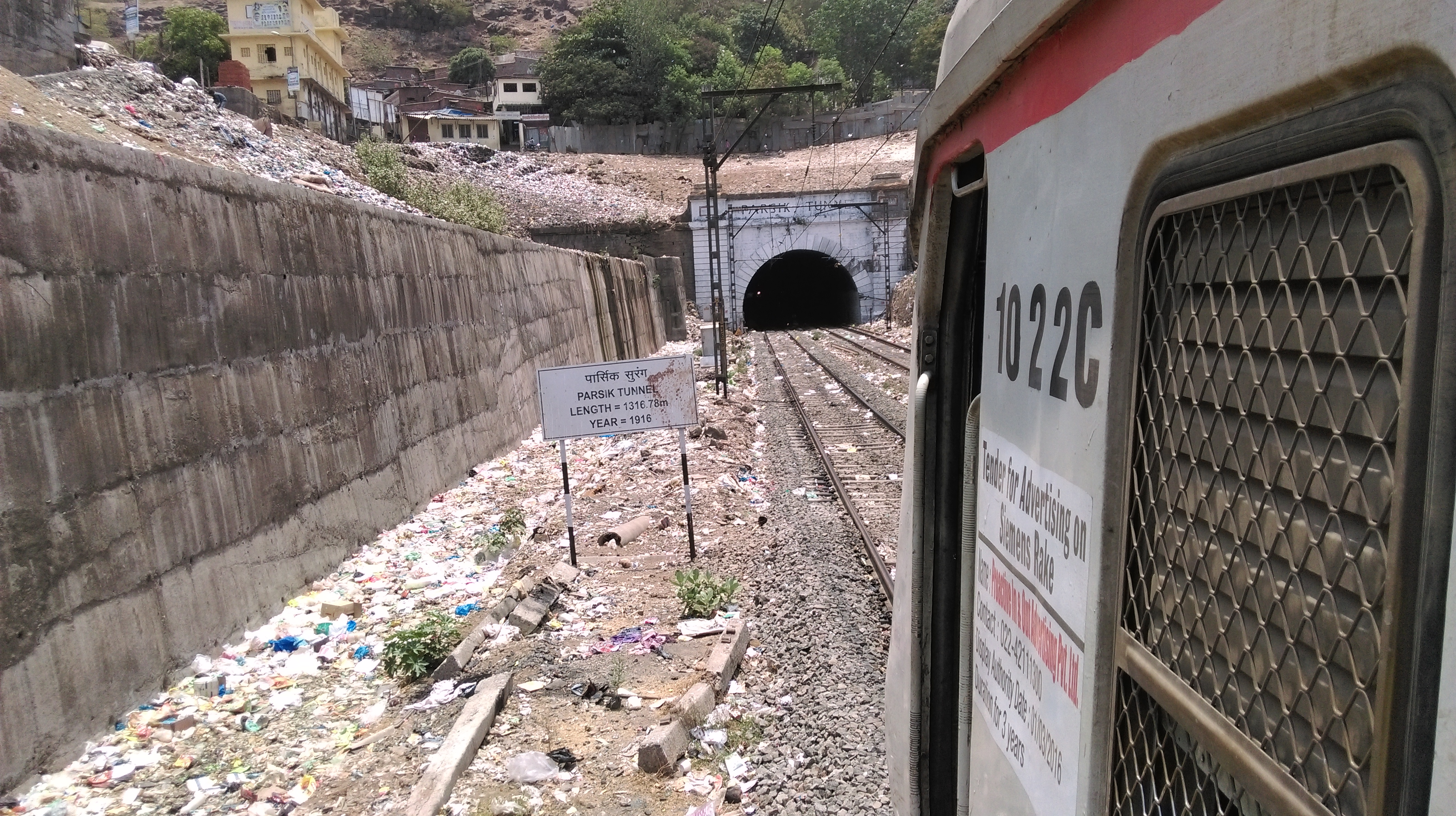
- Mumbai EMU train enters into the Parsik Tunnel
- Interactive map of Parsik Tunnel

Overview
- Line: Central line (Mumbai Suburban Railway), Mumbai–Chennai line, Howrah–Nagpur–Mumbai line, Howrah–Allahabad–Mumbai line
- Location: Thane district, Maharashtra, India
- Status: Active
- Start: Thane
- End: mumbra

Operation
- Work began: 1906; 120 years ago
- Opened: 1916; 110 years ago
- Owner: Indian Railways
- Operator: Central Railway zone of Indian Railways
- Traffic: Train
- Character: Through Rail-passenger and freight.

Technical
- Length: 1.31678 km (0.81821 mi)
- Track length: 1,681 m (5,515 ft)
- No. of tracks: 2
- Track gauge: 1,676 mm (5 ft 6 in) (Broad gauge)
- Electrified: 25 kV 50 Hz AC Overhead line
- Operating speed: 90 km/h (56 mph)
- Tunnel clearance: 6 m (20 ft)
- Width: 10 m (33 ft)

The Parsik Tunnel is a 1.31678 km (0.81821 mi) long electrified dual-line railway tunnel located in Parsik Hill to the east of Thane, Maharashtra. It is a part of the Central line. This tunnel bypasses the Kalwa and Mumbra railway stations, making it a fast line between Thane and Diva Junction. The west exit of the tunnel is to the southeast of the Kalwa station, while the east exit is to the south of the Mumbra station.

== Length and elevation ==
The elevation of Parsik Tunnel is 45 m (148 ft) above sea level. The width of the tunnel is 10 m (33 ft) with a height of 6 m (20 ft). It is one of the oldest and longest tunnels in India. Trains typically cross the tunnel in 2 minutes. The speed limit is 90 km/h (56 mph).

== History ==
After the Inauguration of the first railway line between Bori Bunder (now Chhatrapati Shivaji Maharaj Terminus) and Thane in 1853 and Extension to Kalyan in 1854 which was laid by the GIPR. At that time the distance between Thane and Diva station was 9.6 km (6.0 mi) and the rail traffic was going higher, Due to that the quadrupling of Thane–Kalyan section was required. For that purpose, there was need for an alternate route for passing freight trains and passenger trains through Parsik Hill, The GIPR started construction of this tunnel in 1906, it took time 10 years to construct the tunnel and opened at the year 1916.

After the construction of the tunnel, it became the third-largest tunnel in Asia in the year 1916 and categorized as the tunnel of the fast line of Central line with reducing the distance between Thane and Diva to 7 km (4.3 mi). Whereas the longer route of 9.6 km (6.0 mi) categorized as the slow line of Central line. And also becomes the landmark of a first-mile long tunnel constructed by Indian Railways, during the British period in India.

This tunnel was electrified in the late 1920s with 1.5 kV DC by GIPR which came under the electrification project of Central Main line between Chhatrapati Shivaji Maharaj Terminus and Kalyan.

After the Independence of India, and Incorporation of GIPR into the Central Railway in 1951. The Maintenance work of this tunnel was taken over by Central Railway.

On 12 January 2014, Central Railway converted the Parsik tunnel, Kalyan-Diva slow line, Kalyan-Thane fast line, and Thane-LTT 5th/6th lines from 1.5 kV DC to 25 kV 50 Hz AC Overhead line.

== New Projects ==
Two new tunnels have been planned across the Parsik Hill. one of these will be parallel to the existing tunnel for fast suburban train and freight trains and the second one for slow suburban trains between Kalwa and Mumbra stations.
