= Tariq Garden collapse =

2020 building collapse in Mahad, India

- Location of Raigad district in Maharashtra
- Date: 25 August 2020
- Location: Raigad district, Mumbra, Maharashtra, India; 18.65°N 72.88°E
- Cause: Collapse due to monsoon rains
- Deaths: 12

On 25 August 2020, a building collapsed in Mahad, India, killing at least 12 people and trapping at least 60 others.

== Background ==
The 2020 monsoon was particularly severe, when rains in Mumbai dropped nearly a year's worth of rain in just a month. Monsoon flooding in Kerala killed at least 132 people in August 2020. In July, heavy rain in Mumbai caused the collapse of a 9-story building, and more than 1200 people were killed in over 1000 building collapses across India in 2017.

== Collapse ==
The 5-story building located in the Raigad district collapsed amid poor construction materials used. The collapse killed at least 16 and trapped at least 30 others. The building had approximately 40 apartments, and collapsed at approximately 6:25pm when many of its residents were out. The structure was 6 years old at the time of the disaster, and was reportedly built on weak foundations. Residents had complained about poor construction.

Eyewitnesses report that initially the top 5 floors collapsed, like a "house of cards". Rescue operations continued for at least 33 hours, among those pulled from the rubble was a four-year-old boy 4-year-old boy was rescued after 19 hours name: Mohammed Nadim Bangi and Mehrunnisa Abdul Hameed Kazi age 63 rescued after 29 houses and his Husband found dead after 32 house. Rescue team stop there operation after continued 33 house.

== Reactions ==
Indian Prime Minister Narendra Modi took to Twitter and wrote "Saddened by the building collapse in Mahad, Raigad in Maharashtra. My thoughts are with the families of those who lost their dear ones. I pray the injured recover soon. Local authorities and NDRF teams are at the site of the tragedy, providing all possible assistance."

== See also ==
- 2013 Thane building collapse
