= 2013 Thane building collapse =

Building collapse in Maharashtra, India

- Date: 4 April 2013
- Location: Shil Phata, Mumbra, Thane, Maharashtra, India; 19.1709°N 73.0277°E Shil Phata, Mumbra, Mumbai
- Deaths: 74 total (Note: Reports from a day or two earlier reported 72 killed.); 18 children, 33 men, 23 women
- Injuries: 60 – 62 total; 36 admitted to hospitals (Note: The Voice of America reported on 6 April 2013 that 36 people were still being treated at local hospitals.)
- Suspects: Jamil Qureshi, builder; Salim Shaikh, builder; Deepak Chavan, Deputy Commissioner; Babasaheb Andhale, Assistant Municipal Commissioner; Kiran Madke, Thane Municipal Corporation (TMC) clerk; Hira Patil, NCP corporator; Jehangir Sayyed, Head constable, Diaghar; Jabbar Patel, real estate agent; Afroz Alam Ansari, building material supplier; Farooq Abdul Latif Chapra, "fake architect"; Rafiq Dawood Kamdar, middleman / bribery; Subash Rawal, TMC Executive Engineer; Ramesh Inamdar, TMC Deputy Engineer; Shyam Thorbole, Assistant Municipal Commissioner; Hadisulla Rakbulla Choudhary, partner of the developer
- Charges: Culpable homicide not amounting to murder, criminal conspiracy and dereliction of duty.

On 4 April 2013, a building collapsed on tribal land in Mumbra, a suburb of Thane in Maharashtra, India. It has been called the worst building collapse in the area. (Note: It has also been called the worst building collapse disaster in the past 10 years within the state of Maharashtra, and the worst in the country in 20 years.) Seventy-four people (18 children, 33 men and 23 women) were killed, while more than 100 survived. The search for additional survivors ended on 6 April 2013.

The building was under construction and did not have an occupancy certificate for its 100 to 150 low- to middle-income residents. Living in the building were the site construction workers and families. It was reported that the building was illegally constructed because standard practices were not followed for safe, lawful construction; land acquisition and resident occupancy.

By 11 April, a total of 15 suspects were arrested including builders, engineers, municipal officials and other responsible parties. Governmental records indicate that there were two orders to manage the number of illegal buildings in the area: a 2005 Maharashtra state order to use remote sensing and a 2010 Bombay High Court order. There were also complaints made to state and municipal officials.

On 9 April, a campaign began by the Thane Municipal Corporation to demolish area illegal buildings, focusing first on "dangerous" buildings. The forest department said that it will address encroachment of forest land in the Thane district. A call centre was established by the Thane Municipal Corporation to accept and track resolution of caller complaints about illegal buildings.

== Collapse ==
At 6:30 pm IST (13:00 UTC) on 4 April 2013, a building collapsed in the Shil Phata area of Mumbra, a suburb of Thane in Maharashtra, India. The building collapsed quickly. First, a section of the building collapsed, it tilted, and then the entire building was brought down. A witness described the event, "The building collapsed like a pack of cards within three to four seconds."

According to Hasina Shaikh, a school girl who lived on the fifth floor with her family: "I had just returned from school and was changing when the building started shaking and came down on us... When I regained consciousness later, I was in the hospital." She says she considers herself lucky to be alive. One survivor is a 10-month-old girl whose parents had not been found as of 6 April 2013. Reuters reported the last survivor was rescued on 5 April, a woman who was "found after workers heard her voice and used camera equipment to pinpoint her location under the rubble."

Dubbed the "miracle survivor", a four-year-old girl, Sandhya Thakur, was pulled from the wreckage. She was unable to open her eyes, but awoke on 7 April 2013 to the awareness that she had suffered a disaster. Her father and six brothers and sisters are missing; Her mother died when the building collapsed. She is physically unharmed, but having a hard time adjusting psychologically.

According to Chief Minister Prithviraj Chavan, payments of ₹50,000 will be made to the injured, and a ₹200,000 payment will be made to the next of kin of the deceased.

=== Building occupied while under construction ===
The building containing offices and apartments was under construction for six weeks prior to the disaster, but there are varying reports on the extent of the construction completion. The Times of India reported that "Twenty-five tenements on five storeys were complete and the sixth and seventh floors were under construction." Although there was no occupancy certificate, the first four storeys of the building were illegally inhabited by site construction workers and families. In addition to families of construction workers, there were also families headed by rickshaw drivers and/or those whose children attended tuition classes in the building. It is believed that the builder wanted the building to be inhabited to prevent it being demolished.

The developers, who intended to build up to 8 such illegal buildings, intended to sell the apartments for ₹1,100 to ₹1,400 per square foot. On average, the apartments were 175 square feet.

=== Land ownership ===
The building had come to the attention of the Municipal Commissioner RA Rajeevsaid because the building was said to be built illegally on forest land. (Note: He said, "We had repeatedly asked the forest department to take action. We had asked MSEB to cut electricity to the building. We have issued notices to about 250 illegal buildings in this belt. We try forcible removal. It is not easy. Also it's a congested area; our equipment is unusable here.") Research into the collapsed building's land ownership has determined that it was owned by a tribal family, and the adjoining lot was owned by the forest department.

Although this property was not located on forest land, R.K. Pol, Chief Conservator of Forests, has said that the forest department will address encroachment issues in the Thane district from Jawahar-Mokhada to Alibaug.

=== Rescue ===
The rescue efforts were supervised by District Collector P. Velarasu and Municipal Commissioner R.A. Rajeev, and the rescue was conducted by incident medical teams and fire tenders. A number of local hospitals treated the injured. The most critically injured people were sent to Sion and JJ Hospitals. Moderate injuries were treated at Thane Civil Hospital and Kalwa's Kalsekar and CSM Civic hospitals. As of 6 April 2013, 36 injured people were still receiving treatment.

Workers, including the National Disaster Response Force (NDRF), used bulldozers, hydraulic jacks, power saws and sledgehammers to break through the "mound of steel and concrete" and dug an additional 8 ft (2.4 m) below ground. The rescue effort was complicated by the way in which the floors were "sandwiched" in the collapse, making it difficult to find individuals in the rubble.

The rescue effort ended on 6 April. According to NDRF spokesperson R.S. Rajesh: "We have dug beyond the basement level, and everything is now cleared; there's nothing left."

== Investigation ==
=== Builders ===
The building collapse appeared to be the result of poor-quality building material and having been "weakly built", according to Police inspector Digamber Jangale and Police commissioner K.P. Raghuvanshi. (Note: An unidentified local witness stated that: "They made an eight-story building of what was supposed to be a four-story building. People from the municipality used to visit the building but the builder still continued to add floors.") Lawful building construction in Thane district requires blueprints to be filed and approved by municipal agencies and permits obtained to connect electricity, water and sewage services. The builders did not file the blueprints in this case.

The police registered a claim of "culpable homicide" and on 6 April 2013 arrested the builders. (Note: The builders constructed an illegal apartment and 50 chawls in Vasai-Virar. The buildings were built on land in Acholegaon to be used to build a hospital, school, and police training facility. Although there were attempts to bribe Vasai-Virar Municipal Corporation (VVMC) officials, the attempts were rebufffed and the buildings demolished.)

By 12 April 2013 Hadisulla Rakbulla Choudhary, a partner of the developer, was arrested for his role.

=== Officials ===
Ramesh Patil, a legislator of the Maharashtra Navnirman Sena (MNS) party, stated that the week before the incident he had complained the building was unfit and not legal. He wrote and sent photographs of this and other buildings to the Thane Municipal Commissioner R.A. Rajeev, Chief Secretary Jayanthkumar Banthia, and the Chief Minister. However, nothing was done.

At a state assembly meeting, Chief Minister of Maharashtra Prithviraj Chavan assured participants that there would be a thorough investigation of the circumstances leading up to the collapse of the building. Two individuals were suspended from duty: Senior Police Inspector K.P. Naik for collusion and the Deputy Commissioner of Thane, Deepak Chavan, for dereliction of duty.

Pratap Sarnaik, Member of the Legislative Assembly, demanded an investigation into the role of R.A. Rajeev, the Thane Municipal Commissioner.

== Background ==
The prevalence of illegal housing in India is due to a lack of housing coupled with high population growth, and illegal buildings are attractive to lower-income people because of the low housing costs. Many people moved to the greater Mumbai area in search of jobs, and without affordable housing, thousands sleep in slums or on the streets. The Ministry of Housing and Urban Poverty Alleviation reports that there are approximately 19 million families with inadequate housing. To meet the demands, there are many buildings constructed illegally. Further, some builders do not follow proper building practices and laws, or execute proper safety measures. Poor construction materials are also to blame in these circumstances. Within the Mumbai region there are estimated to be hundreds of illegal structures. Sameer Hashmi, a BBC reporter, says that activists "allege that unscrupulous builders often pay hefty bribes to authorities who turn a blind eye to these illegal structures and do not take any action against the builders."

This trend has been observed in other municipalities within Mumbai Metropolitan Development Authority in the Navi Mumbai Municipal Cooperation (NMMC) of Nationalist Congress Party, Vasai-Virar sector, and Ulhasnagar.

In 2010, the government of Maharashtra reported that there were about 500,000 illegal buildings within the Thane district.

In February 2013, Sunil Kumar Lahoria, a Navi Mumbai developer, was killed after having lodged complaints about 600 area illegal buildings. His son, Sandeep Kumar, said: "My father paid a very heavy price for exposing irregularities that took place with the active involvement of government officers. He made use of the Right to Information Act to deal with corruption, but he was killed." Forest department officials say that during drives to resolve encroachments and to raze Mumbra-Diva area illegal buildings on forest land, their staff received threats against their lives and threats that women in their families would be raped. A Member of the Legislative Assembly, Jitendra Awhad, and his supporters were said to be the source of these threats. According to Awhad, the threats are "blown out of proportion". (Note: Awhad said: "I intervened in the action initiated against structures that have been around since 1980s. As far as threatening officials is concerned, everyone knows mild language doesn't work with them. "80% of constructions in Thane are illegal. That does not mean you demolish all of them.")

=== 2005 remote sensing order ===
According to Raju Phanse, Right to Information (RTI) activist and General Secretary of the Dharmarajya Paksha political party, Thane Municipal Corporation did not act upon the 2005 Maharashtra state resolution to identify illegal buildings. The order called for municipalities to use remote sensing technology to identify illegal buildings by 28 February 2005 and monitor satellite images every six months. R.A. Rajeev, Thane Municipal Commissioner, said that "we are doing what we can"; he admitted that 90% of Mumbra's buildings are illegal.

=== 2010 Bombay High Court order ===
The total number of illegal structures are estimated to be about 490,000 in the Thane district according to information in the Bombay (Mumbai) High Court. The structures include slums, shops, chawls and other buildings. Although the court ordered demolition of all such buildings in 2010, the government's response was that no illegal structures built before 2001 would be demolished and no action was taken in response to this judgement.

=== 2012 illegal building information ===
In December 2012 Legislator Pratap Sarnaik obtained information, in accordance with the Right to Information Act, about the scope of the construction of illegal buildings in the Thane district. The following was reported in The Hindu for Thane's divisions:

For the nine divisions under the corporation last year, 505 illegal buildings were demolished, there was action against 829 (which does not mean they were demolished), and in December, 2012 alone, 104 illegal constructions were detected. The year round 146 buildings were given notices, and 53 cases of violations were filed under the Maharashtra Regional and Town Planning Act and 83 cases registered under the Brihanmumbai Municipal Corporation Act.

The Hindu reported: "while the TMC says illegal buildings were demolished or given stop work notices, in reality nothing happens. The buildings were rarely brought down and people continued to live there."

== Arrests ==
As of 22 February 2021, nine people were arrested. Information from interrogation of the two builders, and documents found in one of the builder's homes, led to the arrest of the others in this case. Except for the engineers charged with dereliction of duty, the suspects are charged with culpable homicide not amounting to murder and criminal conspiracy. They could be sentenced up to life if convicted.

=== Suspect information ===
Name	Position / role	Arrested on or before	Comments of alleged activity
Jamil or Jameel Qureshi	Builder	6 April 2013	He is charged with culpable homicide, not amounting to murder. Qureshi said that 22 of the 74 people killed were his relatives.
Salim Shaikh or Sheikh	Builder	6 April 2013	He is charged with culpable homicide, not amounting to murder.
Deepak Chavan or Chauhan	Deputy Commissioner, TMC	7 April 2013	Chavan was suspended from active duty for his role in the affair. He was apparently paid ₹500,000 (US$5,200) for his final approval of the project.
Jehangir Sayyed or Sayeed	Head constable, Diaghar police station	7 April 2013	Sayyed is said to have been paid ₹4,000 for having arranged a meeting with Senior Inspector K. Naik and bribing police officers. The investigation will continue to determine who was bribed.
Babasaheb or Baba Shabeb Andhale	Assistant Municipal Commissioner of Thane	7 April 2013	Money was delivered to Andhale by Dawood Kamdar.
Hira Patil	Nationalist Congress Party (NCP) corporator	7 April 2013	Hira Patil, pulled into the case by Jabbar Patel, was paid ₹500,000 to co-ordinate co-operation with senior municipal officials in Thane and Kisna Madke.
Afroz Alam Ansari	Building material supplier	7 April 2013	Ansari supplied low cost building material.
Jabbar Patel	Real estate agent	7 April 2013	According to police, Patel connected the builders with Diaghar policemen to arrange for a no-objection certificate. He requested a meeting with senior officials was arranged through Diaghar officer Sayeed and he contacted Afroz Ansari for low cost building material.
Kiran Madke	Municipal Corporation clerk	7 April 2013	Madke was paid ₹500,000 to introduce Babasaheb Andhale to the developers.
Farooq Abdul Latif Chapra	Made building plans	9 April 2013	Called the "fake architect", he has no degree in architecture but created the building plan. On the date of arrest he was 59.
Rafiq Dawood Kamdar	Middleman / bribes	9 April 2013	A local journalist, he is suspected of co-ordinating the bribes of local officials and police for the builders; His name was found in one of the builder's diary. On the date of arrest he was 44. He is said to have "clicked photographs of the illegal buildings and had then taken money from the builders." Kamdar ran Aapka Buland Ujala, a local paper.
Subash Rawal	Executive Engineer, responsible for removing illegal construction	9 April 2013	Rawal is one of the "two top Thane municipal corporation engineers" charged with dereliction of duty. According to a senior police official, the engineers accepted bribes. Doing so, they did not conduct their assigned duties to remove encroached buildings.
Ramesh Inamdar	Deputy Engineer, responsible for removing illegal construction	9 April 2013	Inamdar is the other engineer charged with dereliction of duty.
Shyam Thorbole	Assistant Municipal Commissioner	11 April 2013	Thorbole was arrested for taking bribes of ₹100,000 related to illegal housing on 23 January 2013 and later suspended. He was arrested 11 April for taking a bribe to stop the demolition drive.
Hadisulla Rakbulla Choudhary	Developer's partner	12 April 2013	The Thane Police crime Branch Choudhary, also called "Uncle", was arrested by the crime branch of the Thane Police on 12 April 2013. He was a partner of the developer of the collapsed building.
Subhash Waghmare	employee of Thane Municipal Corporation	14 April 2013	Waghmare's name figured in the diary of builder Jameel Qureshi who bribed civic officials to overlook violations in the construction of the seven-storey building.
Ramdas Burud	employee of Thane Municipal Corporation	14 April 2013	Burud would regularly demand money from Qureshi who maintained a record of the cash paid to the officials.

=== Chart of suspects' alleged roles ===
This chart was created based upon the builders, police and municipal suspects' alleged roles as identified in an article by the Pune Mirror.

Chart of suspects' alleged roles

Jamil Qureshi, builder	Salim Shaikh, builder
Jabbar Patel, Real estate agent	Kiran Madke, TMC clerk
Diaghar police, including Sayeed	Afroz Ansari, building materials supplier	Sayyed/Naik, Diaghar police	Hira Patel, to engage TMC officials	Baba Saheb Andhale, Deepak Chauhan at TMC
No objection certificate	cheap materials	no police interference	no municipal interference	TMC project approval

Notes:

In addition, TMC engineers Subash Rawal and Ramesh Inamdar allegedly received bribes so that they would not demolish the building.

== Legal proceedings ==
The local court on 18 May 2013 granted bail to Afroz Ansari who had supplied materials and Ramdas Burud, a driver to one of the accused officials of TMC. Judge KR Warrier granted bail to them against personal bonds of Rs 15,000. The court on 17 May 2013, rejected the bail pleas of Deputy Municipal Commissioners Deepak Chavan, Shreekant Sarmokdam and Assistant Municipal Commissioner Shyam Thorbole and engineer Ramesh Inamdar.

== Actions to manage illegal buildings ==
=== Demolition drive ===
A formal campaign to demolish area illegal buildings began on 9 April 2013 and is expected to be conducted before the monsoon season. It will be led by Anil Patil, Senior Engineer. The first phase of a "demolition drive" begins as 57 illegal buildings in the district (including Mumbra-Kausa area) are vacated, taken over by the Thane Municipal Council (TMC) and demolished. To support the effort, 15 additional officials will be added to the demolition cell and 9 legal advisors will be added to address legal matters. The police are engaged to facilitate evictions.

The demolition effort will focus first on the most dangerous buildings. Other buildings at the Lucky compound have been razed as part of this initiative.

=== Cut off utilities to all illegal buildings ===
Further, the TMC intends to have sewer, water, and electricity service disconnected at all illegal buildings in the district. Water and sewer should be able to be turned off immediately; TMC is requesting that electricity is turned off by the electric service.

=== Call centre established ===
The Thane Municipal Corporation established a call centre to receive complaints about illegal buildings on 10 April 2013. Its responsibilities include: notifying municipal officials of the complaints, tabulating information about actions taken and preparing reports of complaints and activities for the Municipal Commissioner. It is a 24 hours a day operation.

== See also ==
- Corruption in India
- Housing in India
- Illegal housing in India
- Poverty in India
- Parsik Hill, Illegal Housing section
- 2013 Savar building collapse, another building collapse that occurred during the same month
- 2013 Mumbai building collapse
