= Mumbra Devi Temple =

- मुंब्रा देवी
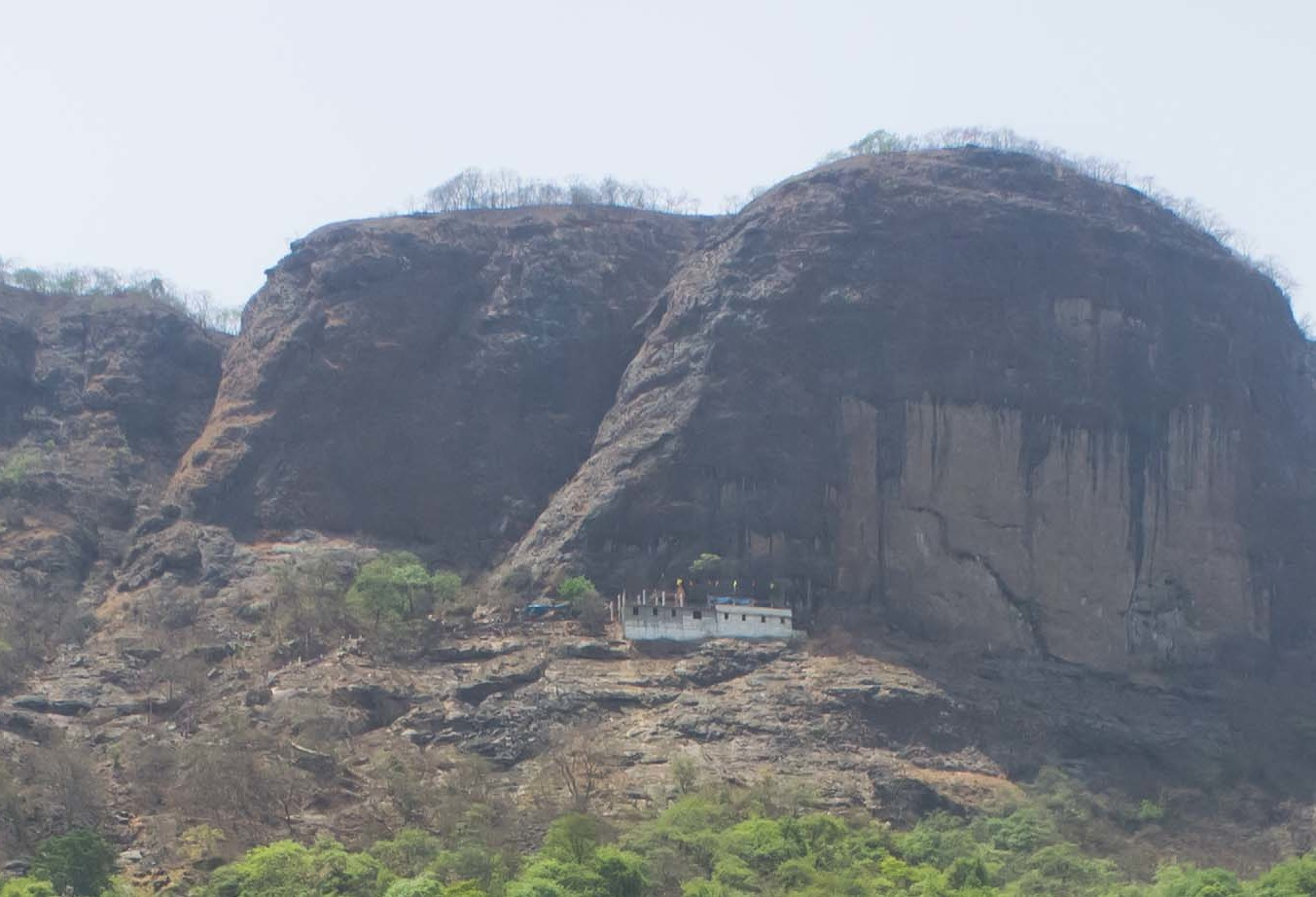
- Mumbra Devi Temple on Parsik Hill in Mumbra

Religion
- Affiliation: Hinduism
- District: Thane district
- Deity: Maa Mumbra Devi
- Festival: Navratri
- Status: Active

Location
- Location: Mumbra
- State: Maharashtra
- Country: India
- Interactive map of Mumbra Devi Temple
- Coordinates: 19.1934°N 73.0188°E

Mumbra Devi Temple is an old Hindu temple situated at the top of Parsik Hill in Mumbra, a suburb of Thane district, near Mumbai, India. The temple is located on the hill, approximately 210 meters from sea level.

Mumbra Devi Temple has idols of nine goddesses. These nine idols are carved in stone, with vertebrae engraved on them. The temple is crowded with devotees on Navratri and many trekkers also visit the area to climb the hill.

== History ==
The term, Mumbra means Navadurga. It is an old Hindu goddess temple built at the time of the British period. There are about 780 steps and it is 1500 feet above. According to a legend, the local people saw a burning flame on the hill. After that, people gathered with Nana Bhagat and went to the top of the hill, saw a lamp burning near the temple, and found the statue of Maa Mumbra Devi. The temple is taken care of by Bhagat family. The recent construction of the temple was built by Bhagat family.

The temple has a mural of 10 faces of the mother goddess Mumbra, the prime deity of the Koli and Agri fishermen tribes residing in the Mumbra area.

It was closed for devotees during the COVID-19 Pandemic lockdown for one and a half years, but it was reopened for devotees on the auspicious occasion of Navratri following conditions and rules issued by the Maharashtra government.

== Accessibility ==
Mumbra railway station is the nearest station on the Central line of the Mumbai Suburban Railway route, and this place is close to Thane and 40 km away from Mumbai.
