= Illegal housing in India =

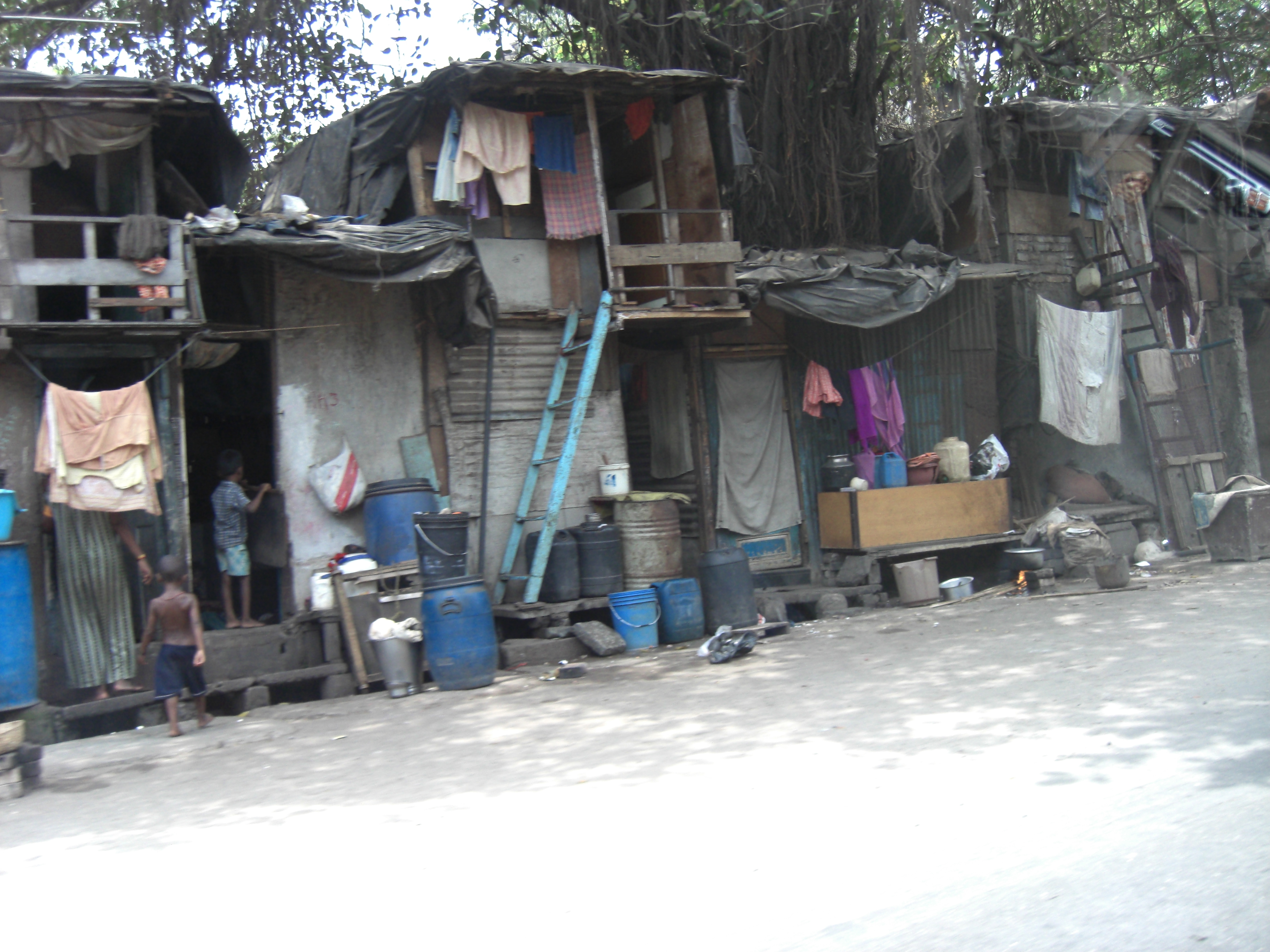
Wadala slums. Over the years, slum development had started in Wadala adjacent to the railway tracks and a large colony began to form. In 2006, the state government took action and cleared the area of slums.

Illegal housing in India consists of huts or shanties built on land not owned by the residents (i.e., squatting) and illegal buildings constructed on land not owned by the builders or developers. Although illegal buildings may afford some basic services, such as electricity, in general, illegal housing does not provide services that provide healthy, safe environments.

Collapses of illegal buildings made with inadequate building supplies and practices may result in the deaths of their occupants. A recent example is the 4 April 2013 collapse of an eight-story building in the Shil Phata area of Mumbra, in the greater Mumbai area; 72 people were killed in the collapse.

Strategies to curb or mitigate illegal housing include creating more affordable housing structures, redeveloping the safe illegal buildings, developing a plan of action for residents of shanties or illegal buildings, and policing the construction of illegal buildings or shanties.

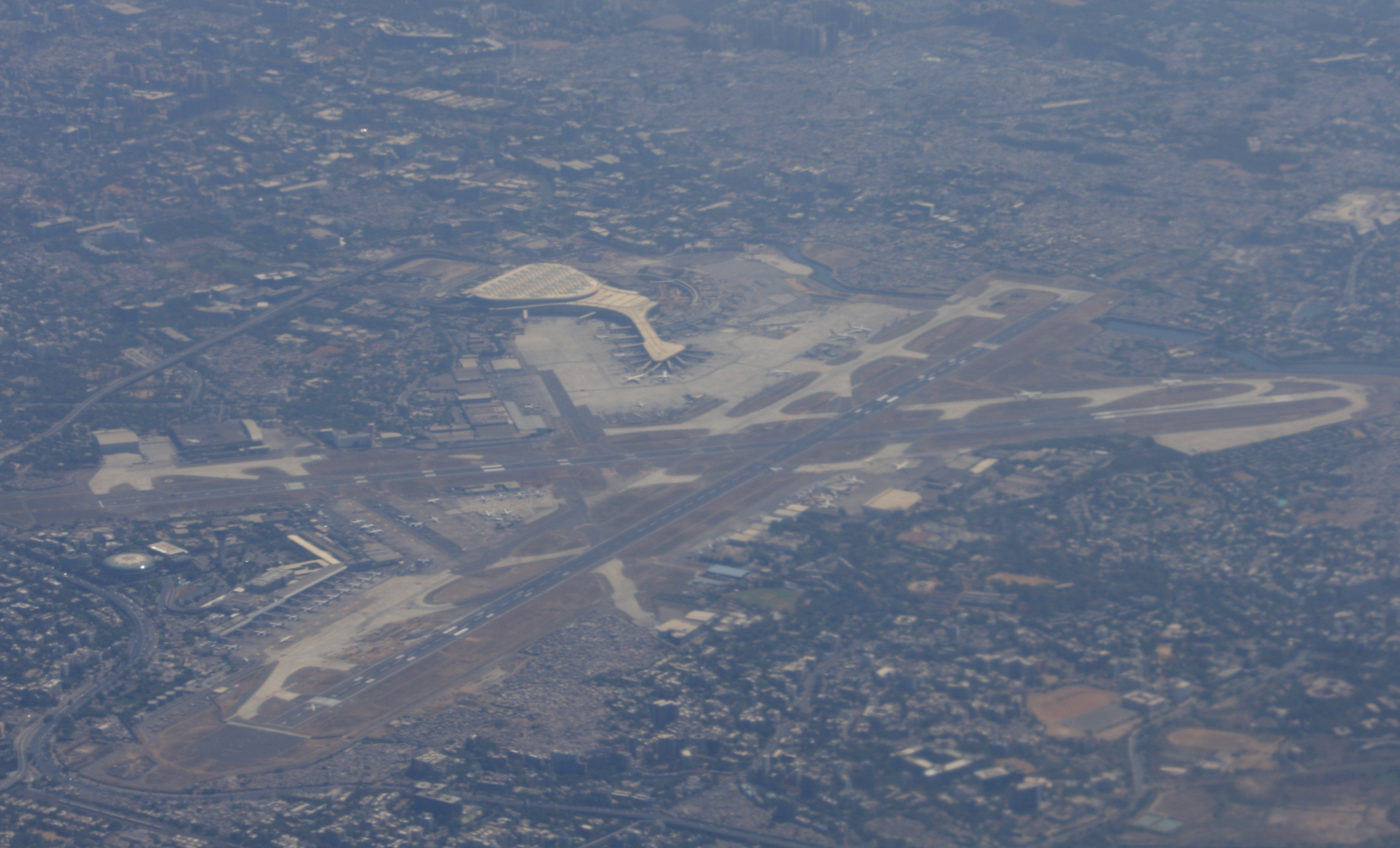
An aerial view of the slums and shanties around Mumbai/Bombay Airport

== Definition ==
Illegal housing is a black economy activity, where individuals either encroach upon property illegally or pay for housing that is illegal. In such cases, there are little or no public services or utilities. In some cases electricity or water is accessed illegally. Illness is an issue due to poor water supply and the unavailability of sewage and garbage services.

To ensure continued residency in the illegally occupied area, its inhabitants generally bribe corrupt officials, corruption being an everlasting problem in India. More often than not, relationships with municipal offices, police and local representatives are organised by a third party with interests in ensuring that the illegal housing is not demolished. Because illegal property is not taxed, there is no income stream to pay for health or other municipal services that are required for its inhabitants.

== History and background ==
=== Legal environment ===
Ineffective land reform and rent control policies beginning in the 1950s and building height and land ceiling restrictions of the 1970s have "single-handedly exacerbated overcrowding and lack of urban space in India several times over," according to Vinayak Chatterjee, government and private sector infrastructure consultant. India had the world's lowest percentage of affordable housing by the 1980s.

Nandan Nilekani, author of Imagining India: The idea of a Renewed Nation commented:

A series of well-meaning but horribly counterproductive laws passed during this decade [1970s], which gave an immense leg up to interest groups in the city. The rent-control legislation and the Urban Land Ceiling Act had effects that, in the best of social tradition, were just the opposite of what they intended. The rent act, by stating minimal leasing periods and strict eviction limits, basically gave renters carte blanche to squat and quickly took unoccupied housing off the market, and the land ceiling act shifted large amounts of land into the illegal market.

The real estate development market in India can exhibit monopolistic and oligopolistic tendencies. Since the 1990s all of Mumbai's available private land has been controlled by a small group of development organisations where land is "released in small quantities when prices were high." Governmental agencies, like the Delhi Development Authority (DDA), control the Delhi real estate market place since the Delhi Development Act of 1957, which prevents private developers from entering the market.

The multiple initiative Jawaharlal Nehru National Urban Renewal Mission was launched in 2005, but ineffective due to poor execution. Greater success could be found through improved, fair and effective regulation; stronger engagement of the private sector; and policies that allow for use of private capital. Enabling city governments to become more effective urban managers, through coordination or delegation of duties performed at the state level and training, will also create an environment for more effective urban renewal projects.

The early years of the 21st century have seen a worsening of urban services, including housing, resulting in "informal, non-state solutions" such as local efforts to provide utility services to slums for a fee.

=== Population growth and inadequate affordable housing ===
The Ministry of Housing and Urban Poverty Alleviation reported by 2013 that there are approximately 19 million families without affordable housing.

A lack of housing coupled with high population growth has resulted in individuals living in low-cost illegal buildings or building shanties or huts on illegal land. For instance, many people have moved to the greater Mumbai area in search of jobs, and without affordable housing, thousands sleep in slums or on the streets. As a result, there is a trend of increased illegal housing in municipalities within Mumbai Metropolitan Development Authority. In the Thane district alone, there were reported to be 500,000 illegal buildings by 2010.

Further complicating land development projects, groupings of huts or shanties on illegal land can stall projects until there is a plan and action taken to remove or relocate the squatters.

== Illegal housing ==
=== Illegal buildings ===
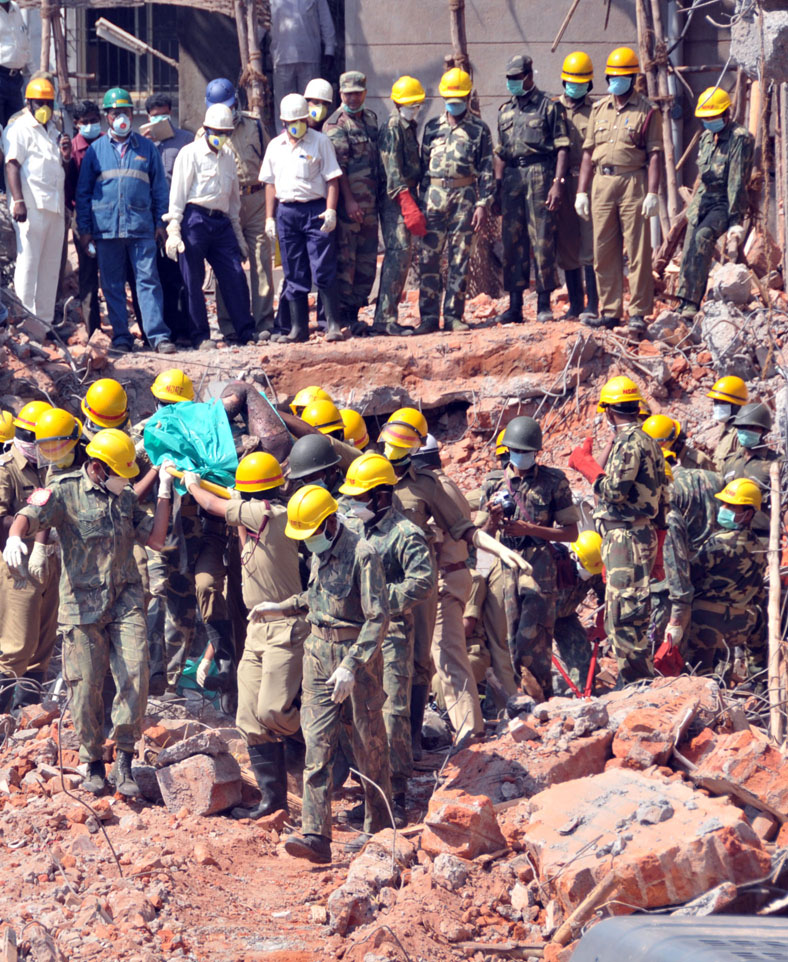
23 dead bodies following the collapse of an illegal building in Bellary, Karnataka on 26 January 2010.

To meet the demands of people moving to New Delhi, Mumbai and other large cities for jobs, and due to the unavailability of affordable housing, there are many buildings constructed illegally. (Note: Legal building construction requires filing of blueprints to municipal agencies, receiving blueprint approval and obtaining permits to connect to electricity, water and sewage services.) The buildings are often created quickly. Some builders neither follow proper building practices and laws nor implement proper safety measures. Poor construction materials are also to blame in these circumstances. Within the Mumbai region there are estimated to be hundreds of illegal structures that have been built. Sameer Hashmi, BBC reporter, reports that activists "allege that unscrupulous builders often pay hefty bribes to authorities who turn a blind eye to these illegal structures and do not take any action against the builders."

==== Building collapses ====
In the wake of the 2013 Thane building collapse that killed 72 people, CNN reported that police had "registered a case of culpable homicide against the builder of the structure".

In New Delhi in November 2010, there were 67 people or more killed from the collapse of an apartment building.

=== Illegal huts or shanties ===
Huts or shanties built on illegal land are sometimes assembled with brick and concrete, but often made with cardboard, tin and plastic. Hut communities, or slums, may be managed by slum lords, which may have access to water, but rarely sewer facilities. The term "slum" does not in all cases mean that the community is an illegal one; some slums are legal housing communities.

As of 2009 there were about 170 million people living in slums. About 66% of Mumbai's residents live in shanties, including about 40% of the city's police force. Mumbai's largest mafia organisation, D-Company, has leased access to public lands that they have gained through squatting.

== Political dynamics ==
Actions and reactions to illegal housing run the gamut from entitlement to eviction. In a 1991 project called "Operation Eviction" from A. R. Antulay's government, thousands of people from Maharashtra slums were transported great distances away from their homes. In the previous decade Arjun Singh, the Madhya Pradesh Chief Minister, handed out land rights, called pattas, to illegal communities.

Slum Dwellers International is a global movement of the urban poor. SDI aims to ensure that the needs of its members are integrated and not marginalised by city administrations. The current chairperson is Sheela Patel.

== Strategies ==
Strategies for curbing and managing illegal structures include:

Affordable Housing

- Construction of affordable housing, perhaps replicating the cluster development model used in Mumbai

Identify and take action on illegal buildings

- Increased policing to curb illegal building construction
- Establish call centres to field complaints and track actions taken
- Use remote sensing technology to identify illegal buildings

Development schemes

- Redevelopment of existing, structurally sound illegal buildings
- Brownfield town planning for illegal, dangerous buildings

== See also ==
- Indian states ranking by families owning house
- Corruption in India
- Housing in India
- Ministry of Housing and Urban Poverty Alleviation (India)
- Pavement dwellers
- Shanty town
- Squatting
- Slums in India
- Street children in India
- Urbanisation in India

Sanitation

- Manual scavenging
- Water supply and sanitation in India
