= Rajiv Gandhi Medical College =

Medical College & Hospital in Kalwa, Thane, Maharashtra, India

- Thane Municipal Corporation
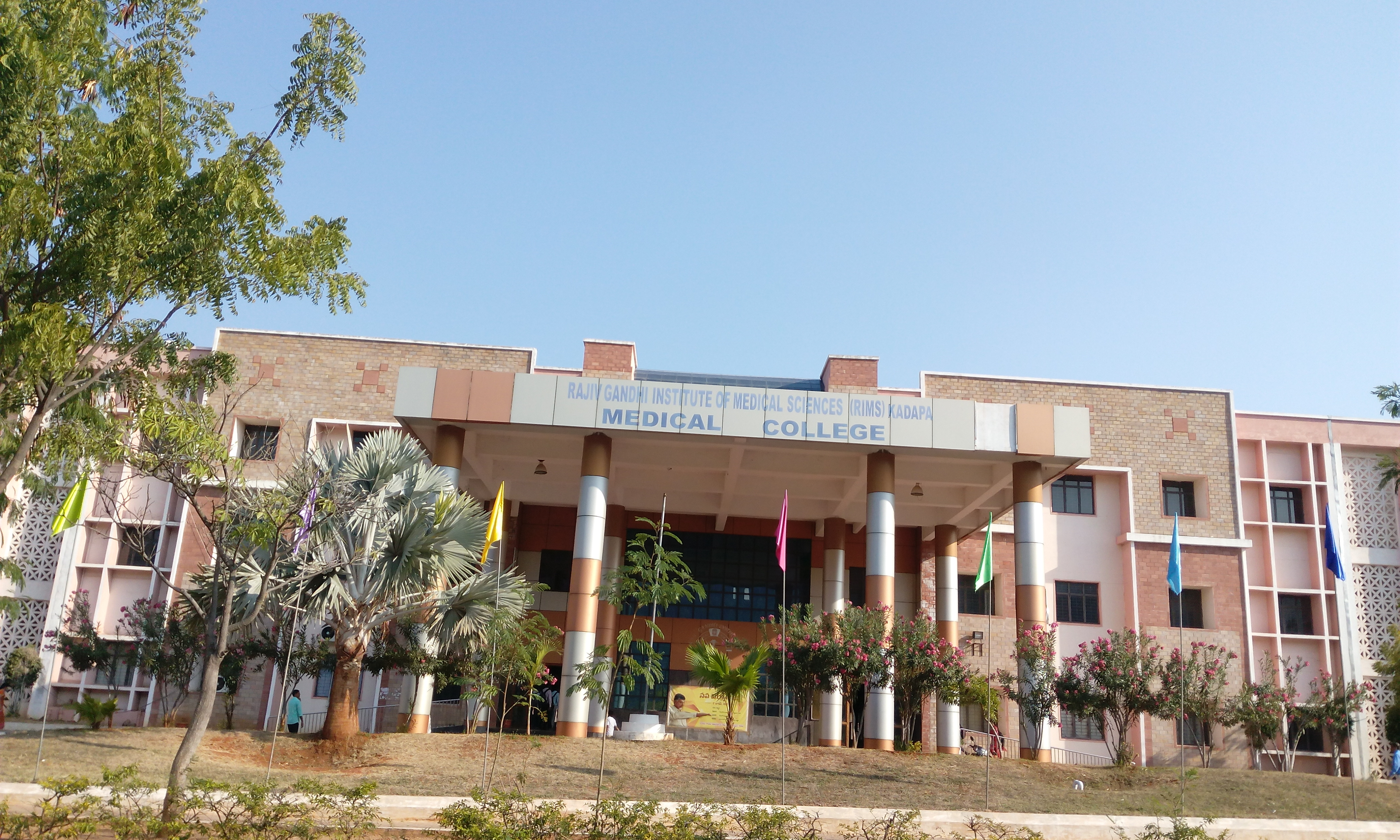
- Rajiv Gandhi Medical College entrance

Geography
- Location: Kalwa, Thane, Mumbai Metropolitan Region, Maharashtra, India
- Coordinates: 19.192419°N 72.986746°E

Organisation
- Type: Teaching
- Affiliated university: Maharashtra University of Health Sciences

Services
- Beds: 500
- Speciality: All leading specialities available

History
- Opened: 1992

Links
- Lists: Hospitals in India

Rajiv Gandhi Medical College
- Type: Medical School
- Established: 1992
- Affiliations: Maharashtra University of Health Sciences
- Dean: Dr. Rakesh Barot (MS Ophthalmology)
- Website: rgmc.thanecity.gov.in

Rajiv Gandhi Medical College and Chhatrapati Shivaji Maharaj Hospital is a school of medicine, established in 1992 and based in Kalwa, Thane, Maharashtra, India.

== Ranking ==
The hospital is ranked sixth in Maharashtra, first in Thane and Mumbai suburban. It is attached to the Chhatrapati Shivaji Maharaj Hospital, both of which are run by the Thane Municipal Corporation.

== Courses and departments ==
The institute has 100 seats for MBBS undergraduate course, increased from 80, since 2022. The number of seats is the lowest in the state among government medical colleges and offers more personal attention to each aspiring doctor. The CSM hospital is equipped with over 500 beds and speciality departments which include Anaesthesiology, Anatomy, Biochemistry, Chest medicine & TB, Dental Surgery, Dermatology & Venereology, Forensic Medicine, HIV, Medicine, Microbiology, Obstetrics & Gynecology, Ophthalmology, Orthopedics, Otorhinolaryngology, Paediatrics, Pathology, Pharmacology, Physiology, Physiotherapy, Preventive and Social Medicine, Psychiatry, Radiology, and Surgery.

The college offers PG courses of College of Physicians & Surgeons of Mumbai diploma courses in Chest medicine & TB, Dermatology & Venereology, Obstetrics & Gynecology, Ophthalmology, Otorhinolaryngology and Psychiatry.

In 2020 the college was affiliated with Diplomat of National Board and now offers DNB courses in departments like Pediatrics, Orthopaedics, Medicine and Surgery.

The Dean is Dr Rakesh Barot.

The hospital has a patient population mainly from the poor areas of Bhandup, Diva, Kalwa, Kanjurmarg, Mulund, Mumbra, Nahur, Thane, and Vikhroli.

== Extracurricular ==
Its main cultural festival is known as "Abhiyaan" and "Abhivyakti". RGMC conducts Medi-Exhibit which is the medical symposium, Ethnic, RGMC Marathon, and Chitrankan - A Photography exhibition.

It also has its very own Medical Conference, Zenith - The Summit of Excellence since it started in 2015. The event became a National Level Medical Conference in 2018.
