= Sunil Kumar Lahoria =

Sunil Kumar Lahoria (about 1961 – February 2013 Navi Mumbai) was a builder from Mumbra, Thane district, India who was killed in February 2013 after reporting about illegal buildings and land disputes.This occurred about a year and a half before the collapse of an illegal building in Thane on 4 April 2013, killing 74 people.

== Illegal buildings ==
In 2011, Lahoria informed municipal and state authorities that within Navi Mumbai there were more than 600 illegal buildings. He also filed a writ petition in the Bombay High Court. Construction of the buildings also violated floor space index (FSI) rules, including development of additional storeys.

21 towers on Palm Beach Road were included in the count of 600 illegal buildings. According to Navi Mumbai Municipal Corporation's (NMMC) town planning officer, Prakash Thakur: one of the towers is being investigated by the Maharashtra Coastal Zone Management Authority and action has been taken on 20 towers.

In addition to the complaints to governmental authorities and the court, he also questioned CIDCO and Navi Mumbai Municipal Corporation's (NMMC) role in allowing the construction to occur.

Starting the latter half of 2011, about six months before Lahoria's murder, he received death threats from builders with criminal connections. Although protection was requested of the Navi Mumbai police, he never received it.

== Death ==
In February 2013, Lahoria sustained five bullet wounds and a slash to his hand and neck outside of S K Brothers Builders & Developers' Office, his real estate company in Navi Mumbai. The two men who shot him wore private security guard uniforms, one of whom knocked a coconut into his head after he had fallen to the ground. Intending to perform a mock funeral, the men had 'agarbattis' and a garland with them

Having seen the incident, two workers in Lahoria's office chased the men. They were able to catch one of the men, a hitman named Venkatesh Shettiyar, who was placed in police custody. The victim's son, Sunny Kumar, claimed that the names of "two prominent developers" had been given by the captured gunman; on the other hand, the gunman told police that he committed the murder because he had not been paid a large commission.

Anurag Garg and Suresh Bijlani, both still escaping incarceration, are suspects in his murder.

Lahoria's son, Sandeep Kumar has continued his father's crusade to mitigate illegal buildings. He has also written to the state Director General of Police and the Prime Minister's Office about the handling of his father's murder investigation. He called out two specific Navi Mumbai senior policemen and questioned the easy treatment of the suspects, including not seizing their passports. Of his father, he said:

My father paid a very heavy price for exposing irregularities that took place with the active involvement of government officers. He made use of the Right to Information Act to deal with corruption, but he was killed.

== See also ==
- 2013 Thane building collapse
