= Kausa =

Village in Maharashtra, India

Coordinates: 19°10′3.02″N 73°1′30.03″E

Kausa is a village of Thane City in the state of Maharashtra in India. It is administered by the Thane Municipal Corporation.

Mumbra is considered as the planned part of Kausa village With (TMC) complexes giving it the best infrastructure. It also has (TMC) stadium and club house & 100 bed's government hospital

Kausa village of Mohammed Hussain Mohammed Ali Karvinkar land in Maharashtra's Thane district has a history of illegal land grabbing and encroachment. It is believed to have been illegally acquired by a group of people in the 1970s and 1980s, who created fake land titles and sold plots to unsuspecting buyers.

The land was initially designated as a green belt area and reserved for various purposes such as public facilities, open land, and agricultural cultivation. However, due to the illegal sale of land and the rapid urbanization of the area, the land has seen a massive transformation, with many unauthorized constructions mushrooming in the region.

The Maharashtra government has taken several steps to reclaim the land and crack down on illegal constructions. In 2017, the government issued a notification to take back the encroached land and restore it to its original status. The government has also formed a committee to investigate fraudulent land transactions and take stringent action against those involved in illegal activities.

Currently, the government is working on developing a plan to regularise the illegally occupied land and provide ownership papers to the genuine owners.

== Transport ==
Kausa lies on the Old Mumbai Pune National Highway. It is connected to Navi Mumbai and Thane through buses operated by the Navi Mumbai Municipal Transport and Thane Municipal Transport respectively. In 2011, the Thane Municipal Corporation announced that it was planning to build a tunnel road to connect Mumbra and Kausa to Navi Mumbai via Airoli.
