= 2022 Mumbai building collapse =

Disaster in India

- Date: 27 June 2022
- Location: Kurla, Mumbai, India
- Type: building collapse
- Deaths: 19
- Injuries: several

On 27 June 2022, a building partially collapsed in Kurla, Mumbai, Maharashtra, India. The four-storey, 50-year-old building, which had been in poor condition for years, collapsed at around 11:30pm. At least 19 people were killed and many others injured.

== Background ==
Structural collapses in India killed 8,756 people between 2018–2022, at the rate of about five people a day. The collapses of residential buildings account for most of the deaths. Delhi had the highest amount of structural collapse related deaths (133) from 2018−2022 out of the union territories, and Uttar Pradesh (1,696) and Maharashtra (1,491) had the most in that period out of the states.

The housing structure was constructed in 1975 on collector land and originally housed over 40 people. It was first served a notice for repairs in 2013, and then in 2016 the Brihanmumbai Municipal Corporation (BMC) disconnected the water and electricity to the structure and asked them to vacate. This request was refused by residents who hired a structural auditor to submit a report that the damage was repairable, and after the report it was removed from the 'dilapidated building' list and added to the 'under repairs' list.

== Collapse ==
On the night of 27 June, the four-story building, which was one of the four wings of the Naik Nager cooperative housing systems collapsed. All four parts of the building had been deemed dilapidated by the BMC. A resident acknowledged that all residents knew the building was dilapidated and had been previously asked by the chairmen of the BMC to vacate the premises by 30 June, causing many to be in the process of looking for new housing.

== Legal ==
The owners of the building Rajni Rathod, Kishor Chavan, Balkrishna Rathod and others were arrested under charges of culpable homicide not amounting to murder and attempt to commit culpable homicide shortly after the collapse of the building. A contractor, named as Dilip Vishwas who housed labourers in the building was also arrested.

== See also ==
- 2013 Mumbai building collapse
