= Kalwa, Thane =

Kalwa
- Suburb
- Location within Mumbai
- Coordinates: 19.19705°N 72.99853°E
- Country: India
- State: Maharashtra
- District: Thane
- Taluka: Thane
- Metro: Thane

Government
  - Type: Municipal Corporation
  - Body: Thane Municipal Corporation

Population (2023)
  - Total: 245,973
  - Density: 16,902/km^{2} (43,780/sq mi)

Languages
  - Official: Marathi
- Time zone: UTC+5:30 (IST)
- Telephone code: 022
- Vehicle registration: MH-04
- Lok Sabha constituency: Kalyan
- Vidhan Sabha constituency: Mumbra-Kalwa

Kalwa (Pronunciation: [kəɭʋaː]) is a neighborhood in Thane city administered under Thane Municipal Corporation in Thane district, in the State of Maharashtra, India. The nearest railway station is the Kalwa railway station on the Central Line of the Mumbai Suburban Railway. Previously, Kalwa railway station had 2 platforms but now it has increased to 4.

On 29 July 2014, Kalwa, along with Mumbra, became first railway station in the country to provide free WiFi access for commuters and the general public.

The Rajiv Gandhi Medical College and the associated Chhatrapati Shivaji Maharaj Hospital, which is run by the Thane Municipal Corporation, is located in Kalwa.

The 3rd Kalwa Bridge was inaugurated by Maharashtra Chief Minister Eknath Shinde on 13 November 2022. It is expected to ease the traffic at the Kalwa Road junction where Mumbai-Pune Road and Thane-Belapur Road meet. It has old Mumbai-Nashik highway in the West. Kalwa railway station also has a local train carshed.
