= Parsik Hill =

Hill in Maharashtra, India

- Location within Mumbai
- Interactive map of Parsik Hill

Geography
- Location: Maharashtra, India
- Coordinates: 19°9′36.31″N 73°1′17.77″E
- Elevation: 235 m (771 ft)
- Area: 15 square km.

Administration
- Established: 1806 by queen victoria
- Events: Railway tunnel and bollywood film shooting
- Authority: India Railway(IRCTC)

Parsik Hill is a hill in the Mumbai metropolitan area, in the Thane district of Maharashtra, India. It has a rail tunnel called Parsik tunnel. It is one of the longest and oldest tunnels in India and Asia.

== Geography ==
The hill has 10 feet (3.0 m) wide ridge that runs 7 kilometres (4.3 miles) north and south, paralleling the railway lines. The hill is approximately 15 square kilometres area of reserved forests, crossing into sections of both Thane and the north side of Navi Mumbai, where quarrying has removed the trees from the hill. In 1985, the highest peak rose to 235 metres (771 ft). Also on the top of hill stands the official residence of the Mayor of Navi Mumbai.

Parsik's steep, scrub grassland hills have featured in some Bollywood movies.

== Ecological factors ==
Due to the impact of quarrying and illegal housing, there is concern about the extent to which the reserved forest will remain in years to come. An ecological activist comments: "The hill has a huge potential for eco-tourism, given that it runs through the municipal limits of Thane and Navi Mumbai and is about 30 minutes from Mumbai. Besides trekking trails, there is also a rock-climbing centre in Mumbra." The ecological balances is also being unsettled by the number of people building and living in shanties in the forest, which could result in reduction or disappearance of species of flora and fauna, including more than 100 bird species.

== Uses ==
=== Parsik Tunnel ===
The famous Parsik tunnel on Mumbai CSMT-Kalyan Junction mainline lies in this hill. This tunnel is between Kalwa and Mumbra. Double Broad gauge track electrified passes through this tunnel. This reduced the distance between Thane and Diva Junction 7 km (4.3 mi) from formal 9.6 km (6.0 mi). This tunnel is 1.3 km (0.81 mi) in length. This tunnel is one of the oldest tunnel in Asia.

=== Recreational area ===
It has been a favorite area for hikers and, since the 1960s, for rock climbers. Courses began to be conducted at Parsik Hills, having had a reputation as "some of the most interesting and convenient area for rock climbing", from the 1960s to 1980s by Darjeeling Sherpa instructors. One of the noted instructors was Nawang Gombu. Rock climbers can complete advanced climbs in one half to one day. The area, most enjoyable in the winter or monsoon season, must be accessed by cutting through groups of illegal shanties, or hutments, that occupy the hill.

=== Quarrying ===
The area is losing its recreational appeal. About 9% of the top of the hill has been leveled due to quarrying, which is contracted to continue until about 2017. Material for general and road construction is created by blasting rock from the hill. It is estimated that at the present rate of excavation, 30% of the hill will have been removed or destroyed within that time.

=== Illegal housing ===
Thousands of shanties, especially along Shil Phata Road, have been built to shelter otherwise homeless families; Forest officials were reported in 2012 to estimate 11,000 shelters were built in the forested land. About 100 unauthorized temples have also been built on the hill. Chief Conservator of the Forests, R K Pole, stated that there are periodic campaigns to remove the shanties in accordance with high court orders, but the net result is that there is little effort, whether through "lack of administrative will and indulgence from political parties", to properly protect the forest land. Deputy Conservator of the Forests, G T Chavan said that there were plans to better police and protect the land; "We will build a 50-km-long wall. We are working towards evicting the squatters."

=== Gavli Dev Water Fall ===
Gavli Dev water fall is a famous waterfall and Bird sanctuary of Navi Mumbai region based in between Mahape & Rabale area right behind Reliance Jio Park. The name Gavli Dev comes from the temple on the top of mountain also Gavli Dev & it is Lord Shivas temple without a roof. A lot of local people visit this area for annual puja & worship. A large gathering is observed on Maha Shivaratri day. The waterfall comes to Thane forest zone of Maharashtra forest department. This is a hidden Beauty of Navi Mumbai Municipal Corporation area. One can go off-road a bit next to industrial area and find the Water fall an awesome picnic spot. In 2022 Municipal Corporation has undertaken this area to build it as a tourist spot.

== Gallery ==
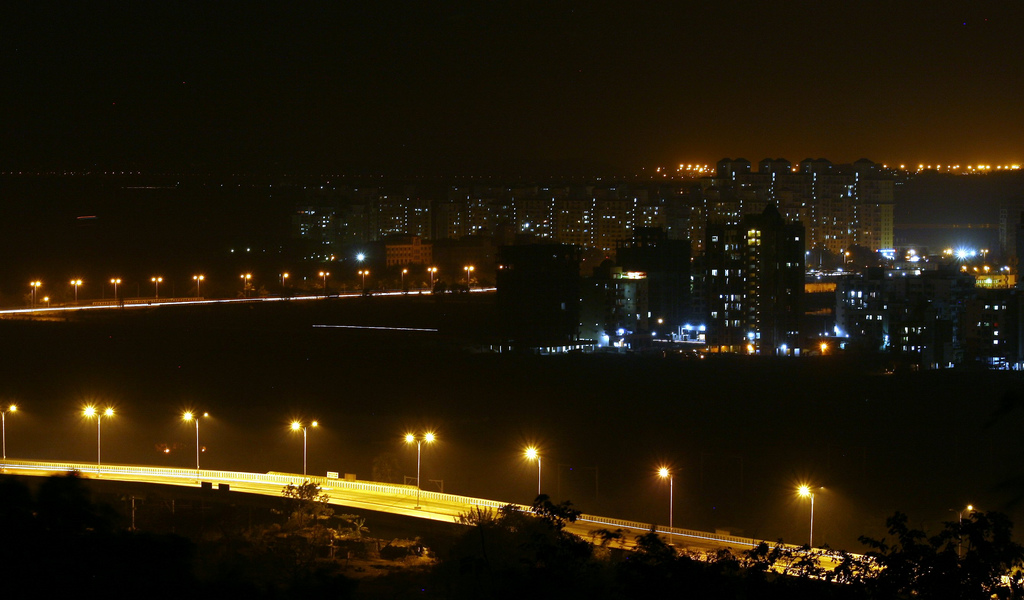
View of Navi Mumbai from Parsik Hill, including building on and beyond Palm Beach Road

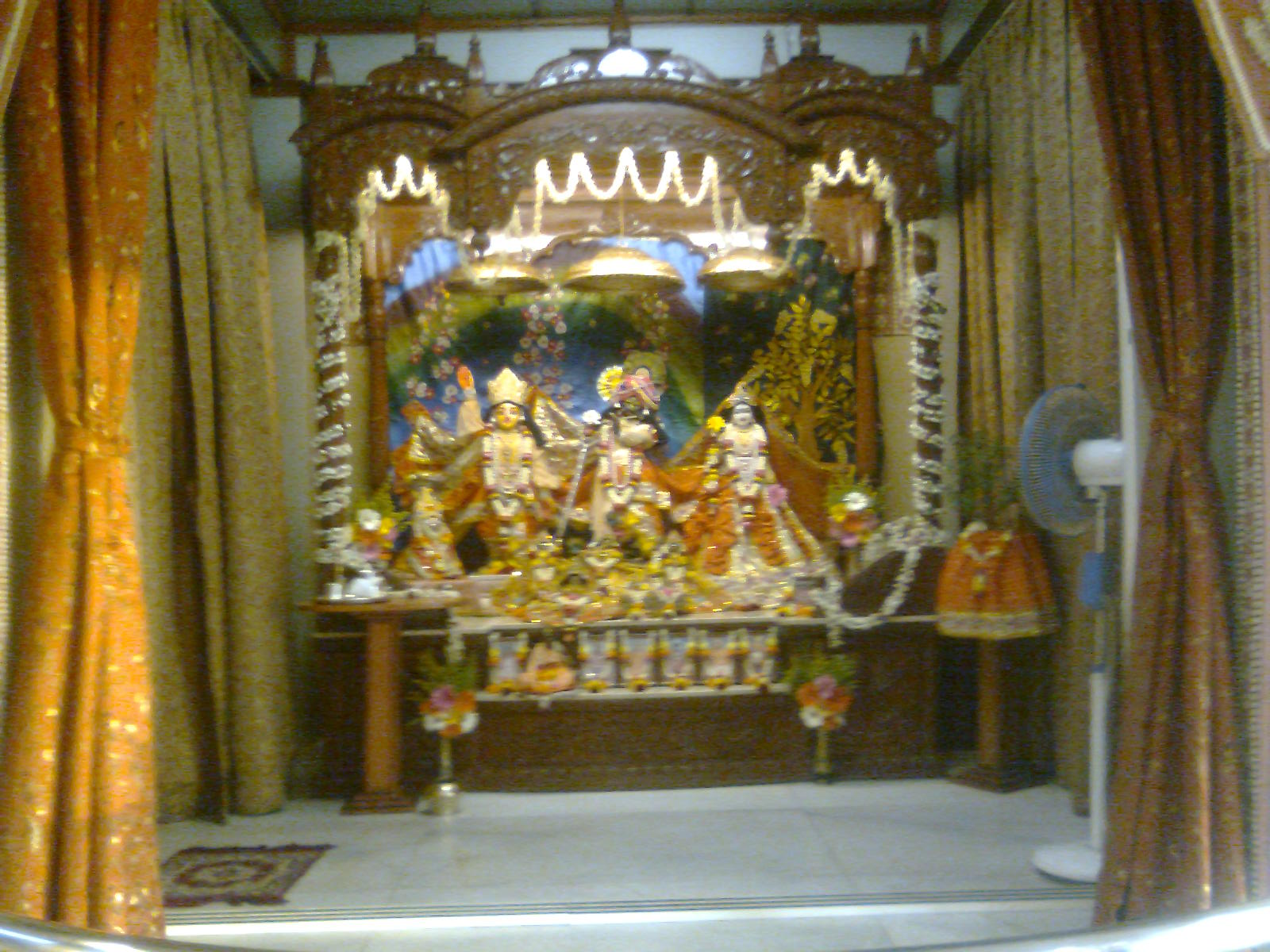
Sri Sri Radha Madan Mohanji Ju at Gaudiya Vaishnava Association (GVA) Bhagavat Dham, Parsik Hill, CBD Belapur, Navi Mumbai

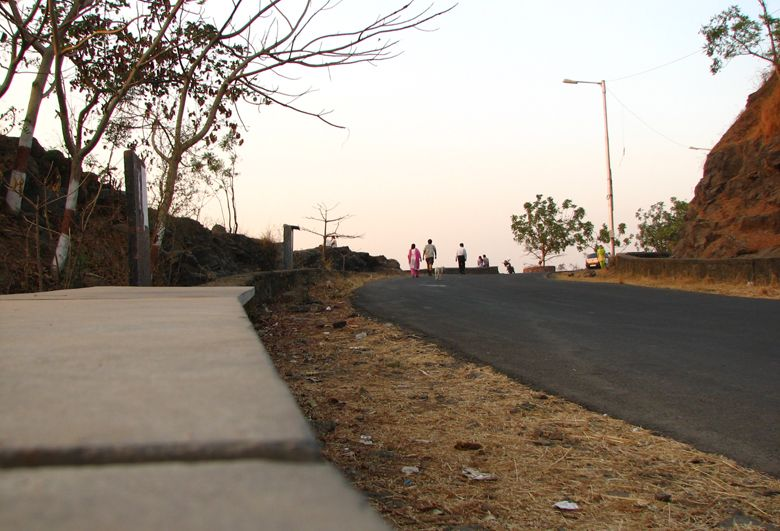
Parsik Hill walkway
