= Shil Phata =

- Shil Phata circle
- Location within Mumbai
- Coordinates: 19.14735°N 73.04053°E
- Country: India
- State: Maharashtra
- District: Thane
- Region: Mumbai MR

Government
  - Type: Municipal corporation under Thane

Languages
  - Official: Marathi
- Time zone: UTC+5:30 (IST)
- PIN: 400612, 421204
- Telephone code: 022 [MTNL Mumbai]
- Vehicle registration: MH-04 [Thane RTO]

Shil Phata or Shilphata is an area about 5 kilometres (3.1 miles) south of Mumbra, in the Thane city of Maharashtra under Thane Municipal Corporation, India. Shil Phata is located east of Parsik Hills on the old Mumbai-Pune Road (National Highway 4).

It is a site of attraction for building projects and is under rapid development phase.

The proposed Monorail project between Mahape and Kalyan, which will pass through Shilphata, is expected to ease commuting and may also impact the property prices in the area.

== Illegal housing ==
It was the site of the 2013 Thane building collapse that occurred on 4 April 2013. Over 70 people were killed and dozens injured in the collapse of an illegal building. Shil Phata was one of the locales within the Thane District where illegal buildings were demolished in 2010. In total more than 300 buildings were razed.
