= Urban Land (Ceiling and Regulation) Act, 1976 =

Indian law regulating land ownership and development

Parliament of India
- Long title: An Act to provide for the imposition of a ceiling on vacant land in urban agglomerations, for the acquisition of such land in excess of the ceiling limit, to regulate the construction of buildings on such land and for matters connected therewith, with a view to preventing the concentration of urban land in the hands of a few persons and speculation and profiteering therein and with a view to bringing about an equitable distribution of land in urban agglomerations to subserve the common good.
- Citation: Act No. 33 of 1976

Repealed by
- Urban Land (Ceiling & Regulation) Repeal Act, 1999
- Status: Repealed

The Urban Land (Ceiling and Regulation) Act, 1976 was a law in India, that was passed in 1976.

The stated purpose of the law is "bringing about an equitable distribution of land in urban agglomerations to subserve the common good."

== Consequences ==
In a real world scenario, monopoly of land can take place when people, entities and corporate companies, with access to huge capital can occupy vast tracts of land, hoard it, make it scarce and use this scarcity to control demand - supply of land

However this problem is compounded due to the fact that governments from 1992 till today refused to develop lands quickly based on growth and demand, much like Germany where timely development of land and releasing it to public allowed land to be affordable.

The Act was repealed by Urban Land (Ceiling & Regulation) Repeal Act, 1999. The repeal Act had in-built commencement date on 11 January 1999, vide section 1(3), for Haryana, Punjab and the union territories. For other states, it was left to the state legislatures to decide the date of commencement. Accordingly, it has been implemented on 28 November 2007 in Maharashtra and 30 March 1999 in Gujarat. The repeal Act has been adopted in all states except Andhra Pradesh, Assam, Bihar and West Bengal.

This act was repealed in November 2007 in the state of Maharashtra. The repeal was a pre-condition to the state government with a grant under the Jawaharlal Nehru National Urban Renewal Mission (JNNURM), to be used for major infrastructure development projects (like the Mumbai Trans Harbour Link, the Mumbai Metro Project, the Bandra-Worli, the Worli-Nariman Point sealink and the Mumbai Urban Transport Project-II).

However, there is still considerable confusion in the process required for the clearance of land for buildings; the repeal has not had much impact on the ground.

The Maharashtra Government has purchased large tracts of land under provisions of this act, to be used to provide low-cost housing to the common people. However, this land continues to lie vacant.
