= Mumbra railway station =

Railway Station in Maharashtra, India

Mumbra
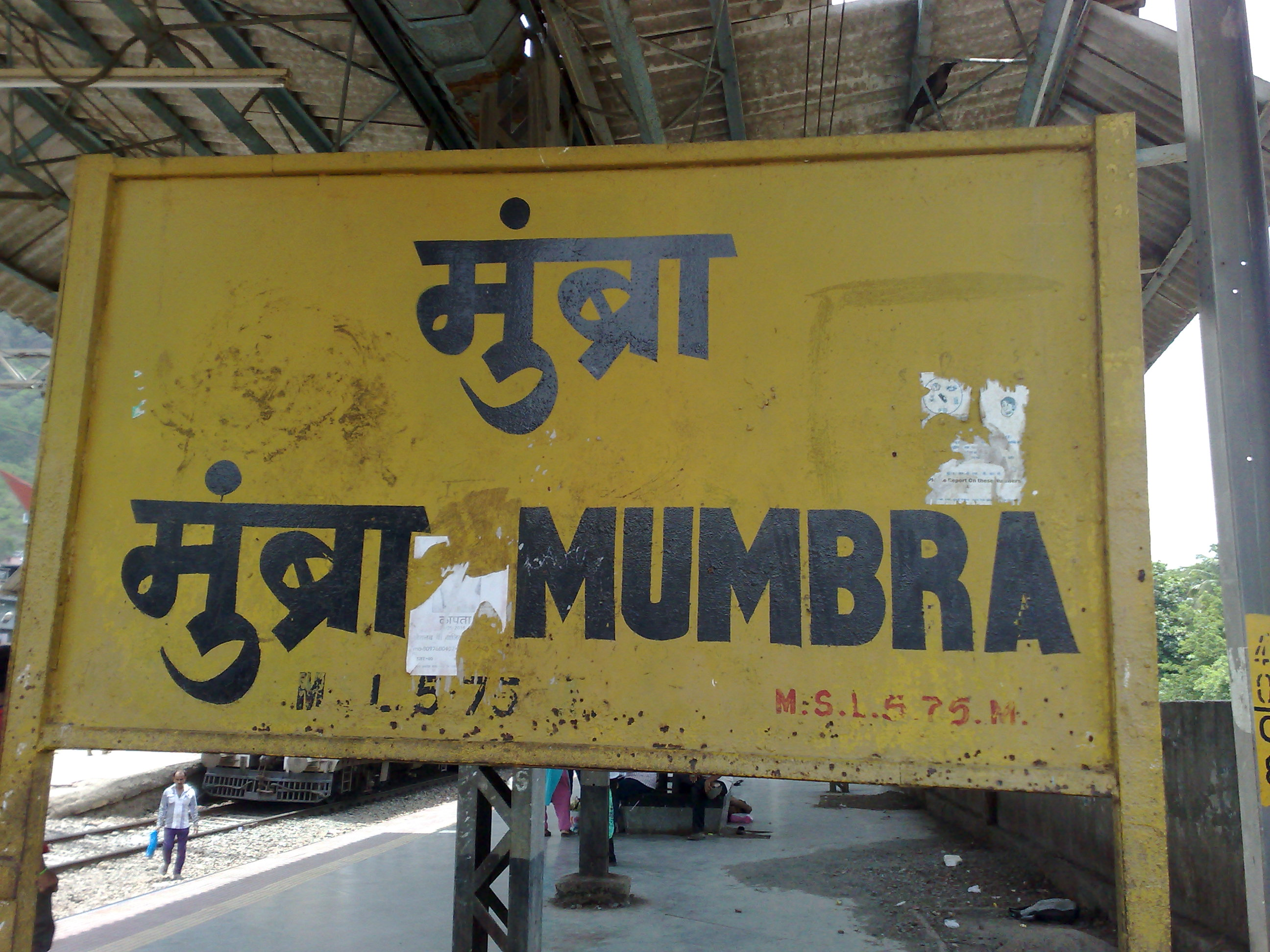

General information
- Location: Mumbra, Thane district
- Coordinates: 19.176667°N 73.02222°E
- Elevation: 5.75 metres (18.9 ft)
- System: Indian Railways and Mumbai Suburban Railway station
- Owner: Ministry of Railways, Indian Railways
- Line: Central Line
- Platforms: 4
- Tracks: 4

Other information
- Status: Active
- Station code: MBQ
- Fare zone: Central Railways

History
- Opened: 1865

Services
Preceding station	Mumbai Suburban Railway	Following station
Kalwa towards Chhatrapati Shivaji Terminus	Central line	Diva Junction towards Kasara or Khopoli
Route map
Location
- Location within Mumbai

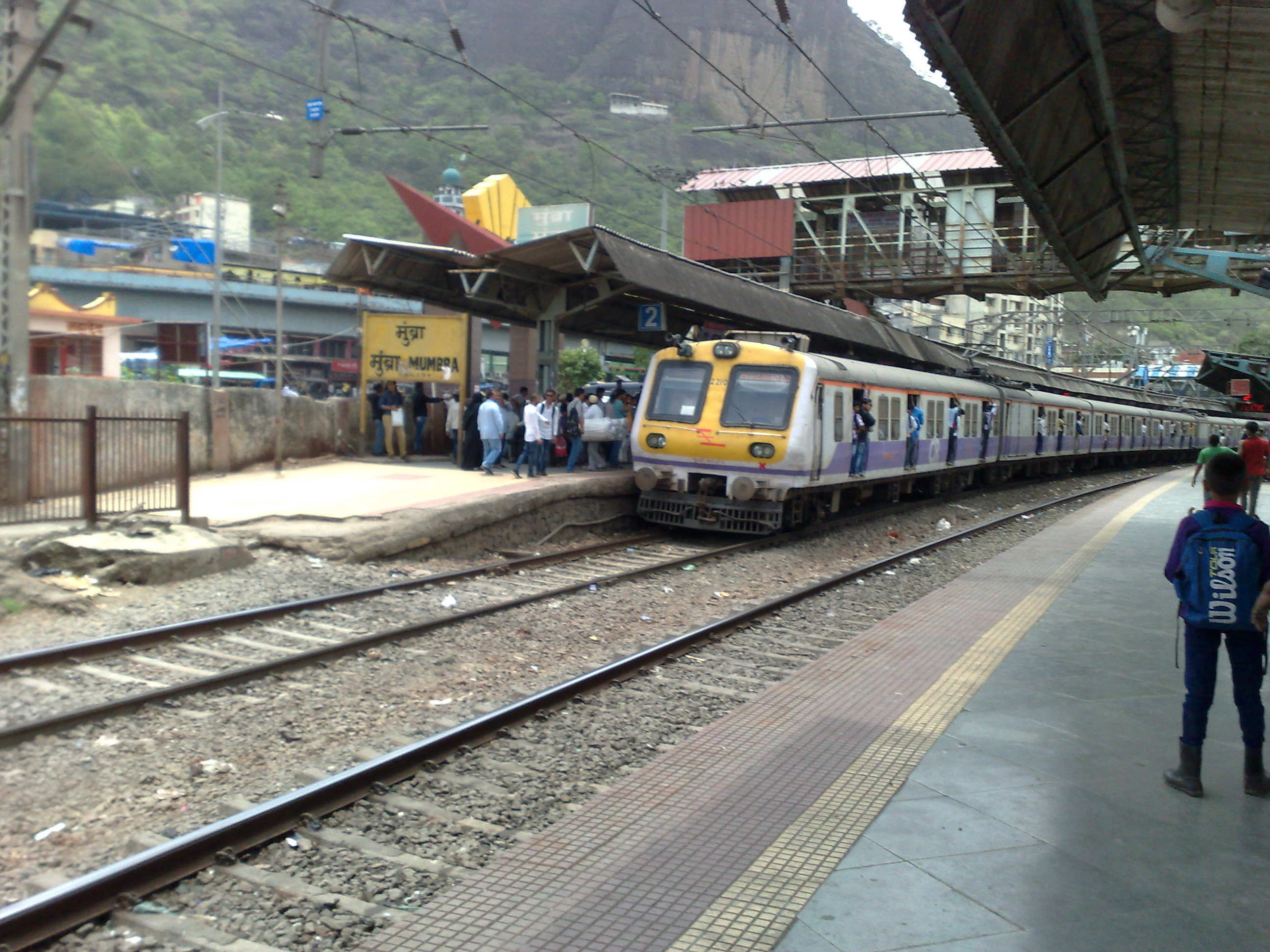
Mumbra railway station - Overview

Mumbra (station code: MBQ) is a railway station on the Central line of the Mumbai Suburban Railway network of Central Railway in Thane district, Maharashtra.

Most of the fast locals coming from Kalyan or from Mumbai bypass through the Parsik Tunnel which is 1.3 km in length and it was once the third largest tunnel of Asia. This tunnel lies on the fast track and has one entry and one exit point in Mumbra. It is the first railway tunnel that was built in India and is more than hundred years old, by the British Empire. It is in the Sahyadri Ranges of Maharashtra and those hills are known as Parsik Hills.
