= Kalwa railway station =

Railway Station in Maharashtra, India

Kalva Kalwa
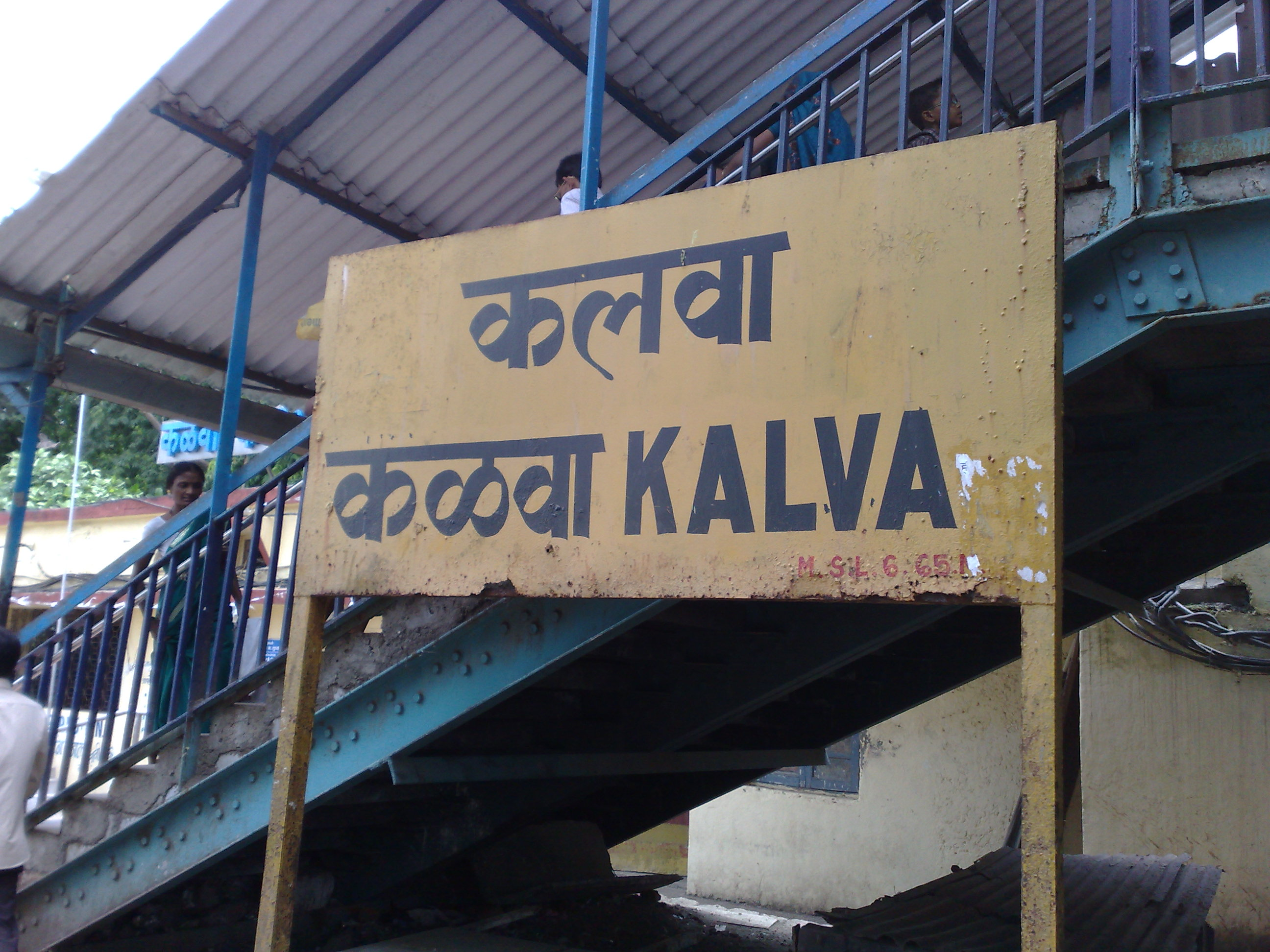

General information
- Coordinates: 19.196060°N 72.997574°E
- Elevation: 6.65 metres (21.8 ft)
- System: Indian Railways and Mumbai Suburban Railway station
- Owner: Ministry of Railways, Indian Railways
- Line: Central Line
- Platforms: 4
- Tracks: 4
- Connections: Kalwa Carshed

Construction
- Structure type: At-grade
- Platform levels: 0
- Parking: available
- Cycle facilities: yes

Other information
- Status: Active
- Station code: KLVA
- Fare zone: Central Railways

Services
Preceding station	Mumbai Suburban Railway	Following station
Thane towards Chhatrapati Shivaji Terminus	Central line	Mumbra towards Kasara or Khopoli
Route map
Location
- Location within India Location within Maharashtra Location within Mumbai

Kalwa railway station, officially Kalva railway station (station code: KLVA) is a railway station on the Central Line of the Mumbai Suburban Railway. It is located in Kalwa. It is situated in between Thane railway station and Mumbra railway station.

In January 2020, commuters using the station have demanded a home platform between Kalwa and Mumbra stations.

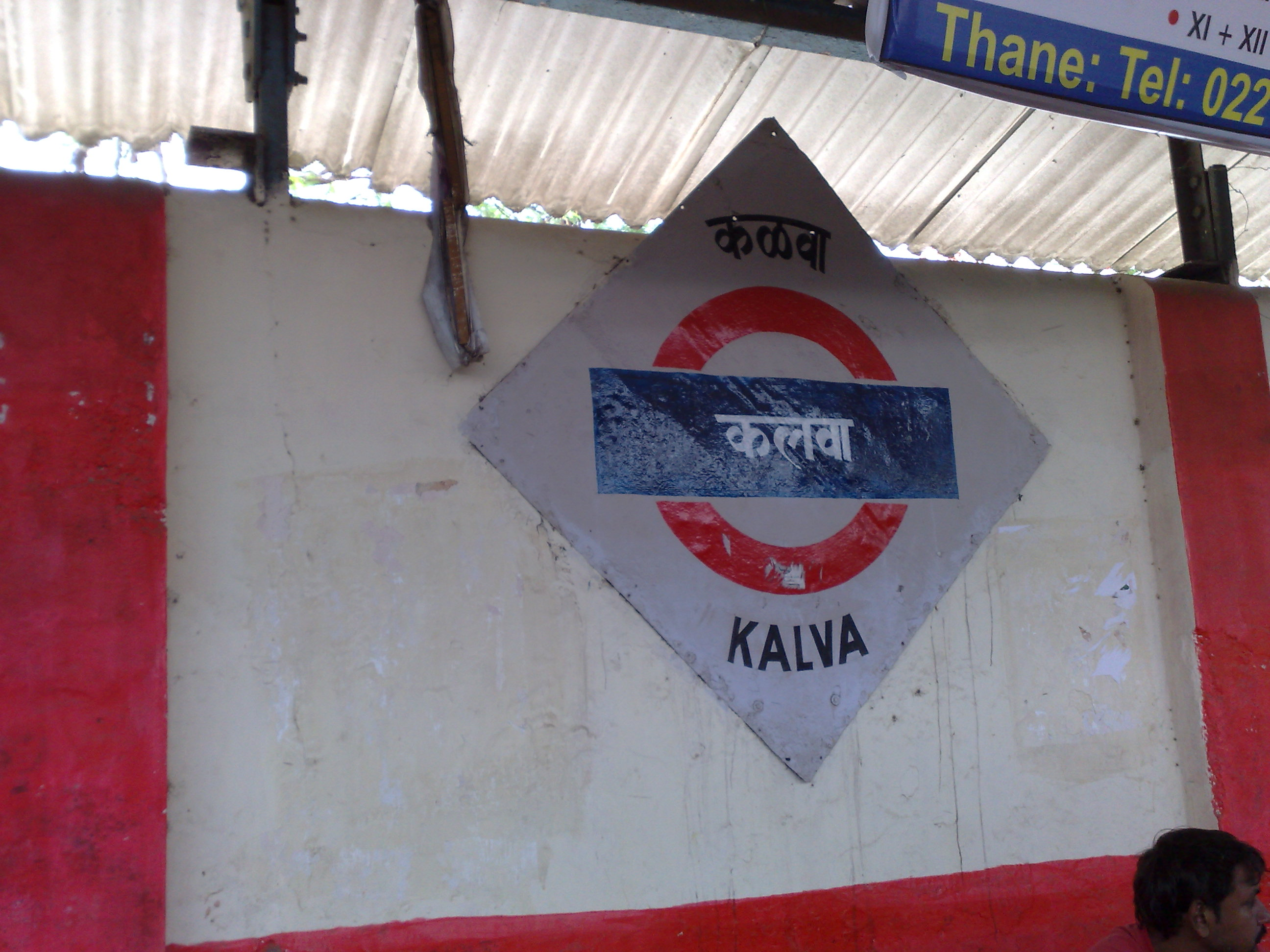
Kalva railway station - Platformboard

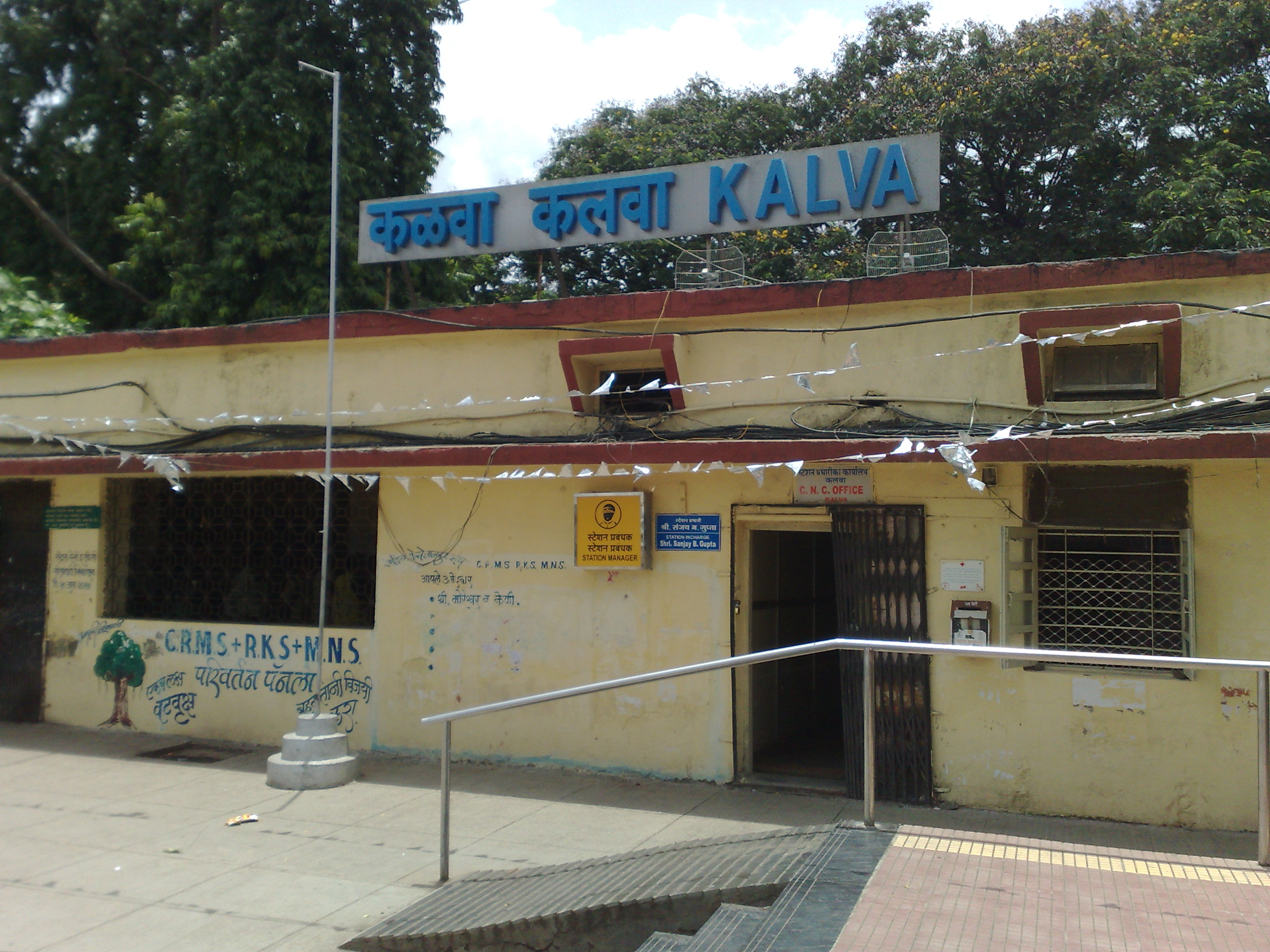
Kalva railway station - Exit

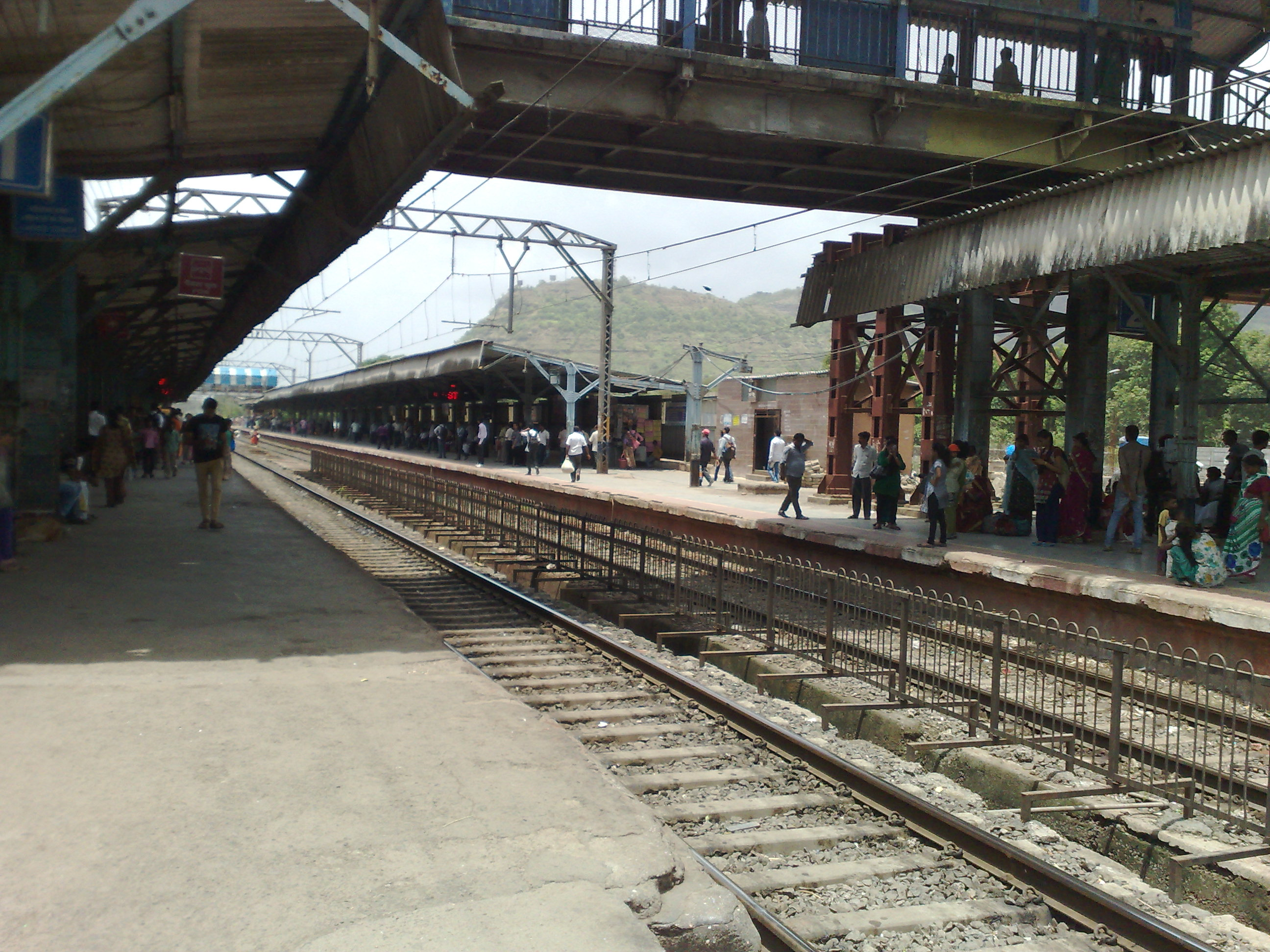
Kalva railway station - Overview

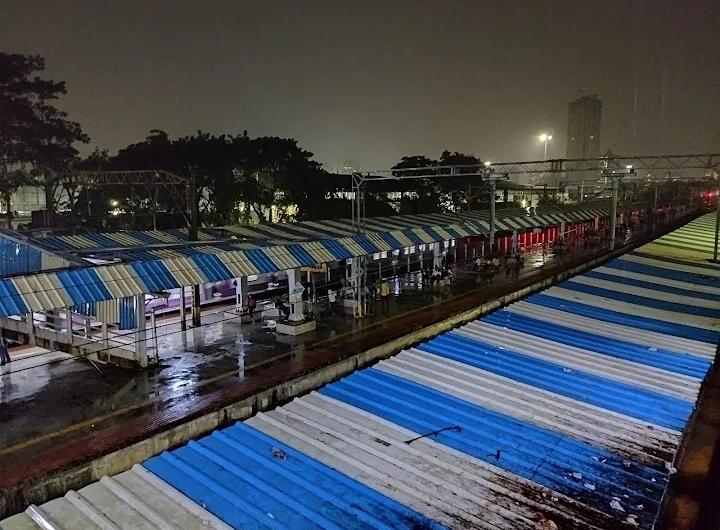
Newly Renovated kalwa Railway Station
