= 2013 Mumbai building collapse =

Building collapse in Mumbai, India

- Location of Maharashtra state in India
- Date: 27 September 2013
- Location: Mumbai, Maharashtra, India
- Deaths: 61
- Injuries: 32

The 2013 Mumbai building collapse occurred on 27 September 2013 when a five-story building collapsed in the Mazagaon area of Mumbai city in Maharashtra a state in India. At least 61 people died and 32 others were injured in the disaster.

== Collapse ==
The building, which collapsed at 6 a.m. IST on 27 September 2013, had more than 100 residents. Police said that the collapse occurred after a mezzanine floor was built without permission in an office-warehouse on the ground floor of the building. The 32-year-old building was owned by the Brihanmumbai Municipal Corporation. Three officials in its civic markets department were arrested for not acting on reports that the building was unsound after the renovation works.

== See also ==
- 2013 Thane building collapse
