= Mumbra =

- Neighborhoods in Thane City
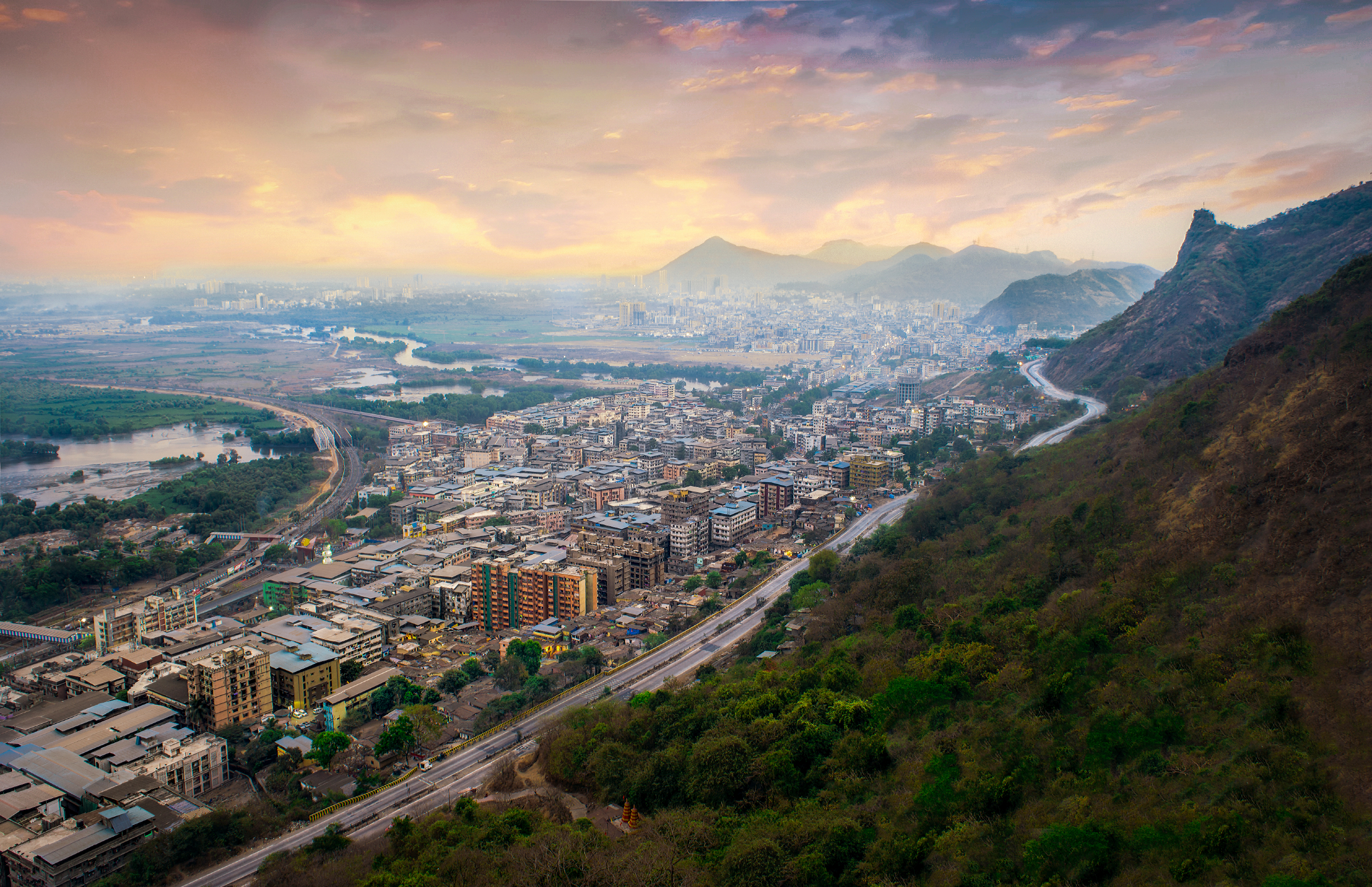
- Sunrise view of Mumbra

- Location of Mumbra in Maharashtra, India
- Coordinates: 19.1761°N 73.0229°E
- Country: India
- State: Maharashtra
- District: Thane
- Metro: Mumbai

Government
  - Type: Municipal Corporation
  - Body: Thane Municipal Corporation

Area
  - Total: 20.43 km^{2} (7.89 sq mi)

Population (2023)
  - Total: 500,000+
- Time zone: UTC+5:30 (IST)
- PIN code: 400 612
- Telephone code: (022)
- Vehicle registration: MH-04 Thane
- Lok Sabha constituency: Kalyan
- Vidhan Sabha constituency: Mumbra-Kalwa

Mumbra is a suburb of Thane in Western India in the state of Maharashtra, a Mumbai suburb within the Mumbai Metropolitan Region. It is administered by Thane Municipal Corporation.

== History ==
Mumbra was a flourishing shipbuilding center in early times.

Much of the land around Mumbra was agricultural land until 1975. Between 1968 and 1975, Mumbai experienced significant population growth and greater population density. Then, about 1975, Mumbra's agricultural land was urbanized. This signaled an expansion of the greater Mumbai area, which realized significant population growth in the 1980s. Wafa Hill's "A, B, C" was one of the first planned Thane Municipal Corporation (TMC) approved buildings developed in the 1990s. Which lead the foundation for urbanization in Mumbra.

In 1991, there were about 44,000 people. After the riots of 1992 many Muslims fled Mumbai and settled in Mumbra; 10 Sq mile land was allotted by state Government under custody of state waqf board for resettlement of fled Muslims of different part of Mumbai. It is India's largest Muslim locality also known by India's largest Muslim Ghetto.

== Demographics ==
Mumbra, has an estimated population of around 900,000 as of 2023, with a Muslim-majority population exceeding 80%.

Religions in Mumbra
1. Islam (80.0%)
2. Hinduism (13.7%)
3. Christianity (4.60%)
4. Other (1.70%)

Key demographics

- Estimated population: around 5–9 lakh people depending on the source and year.
- Religion: Mumbra is known as a Muslim-majority area, with estimates often placing the Muslim population above 80%.
- Languages commonly spoken:
  - Urdu
  - Hindi
  - Marathi
  - English
- Major communities:
  - Muslims (majority)
  - Hindus
  - Smaller Jain, Buddhists, and Christians communities
- Age profile:
  - Large young population due to migration and affordable housing.
- Literacy:
  - Literacy levels are improving and are generally close to urban Maharashtra averages, though infrastructure growth has struggled to keep up with rapid population expansion.

=== Illegal Immigration ===
Local authorities have flagged the issue of undocumented illegal immigrants settling in the region, more than 2 lakh fake voter ID applications were submitted across the wider Thane–Kalyan belt. In December 2020, the Anti‑Terrorism Squad (Maharashtra) (ATS) busted a major immigration racket operating in Mumbra. An agent based in Kausa-Mumbra was arrested for preparing fake Indian passports and identity cards for Bangladeshi nationals, implicating the area as a base for document-fraud networks facilitating illegal stay.

== Transport ==
Bus service is available through the Thane Municipal Transport (TMT) and Navi Mumbai Municipal Transport (NMMT).

Rail service is available at the Mumbra railway station on Central line, also called as mainline. Mumbra is 29 kilometres (18 miles) from the Chhatrapati Shivaji Maharaj International Airport.

The main source of Transport in Mumbra is the Auto rickshaw. Mumbra didn't have any bus starting from Mumbra railway station and hence Auto rickshaw was the only possible conveyance.

But now, Thane Municipal Transport runs a bus service starting from Mumbra railway station to Bharat Gears Company.

State transport (MSRTC) operate regular bus service between Panvel, Bhiwandi, and Shil Phata.

== Gallery ==
Mumbra is known for its green, lavish mountains and waterfalls, enhancing the beauty of the city.

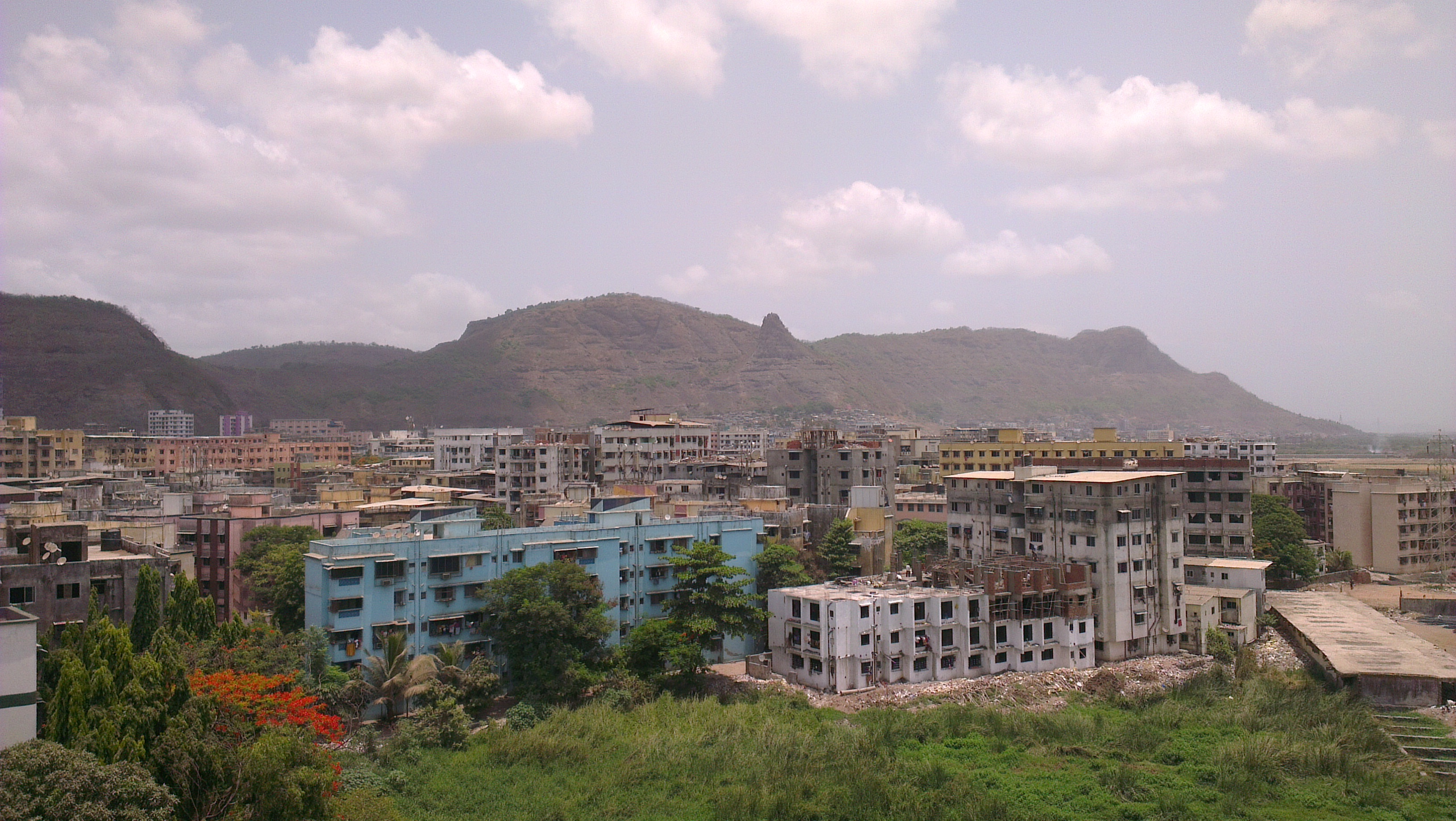
The Green Side

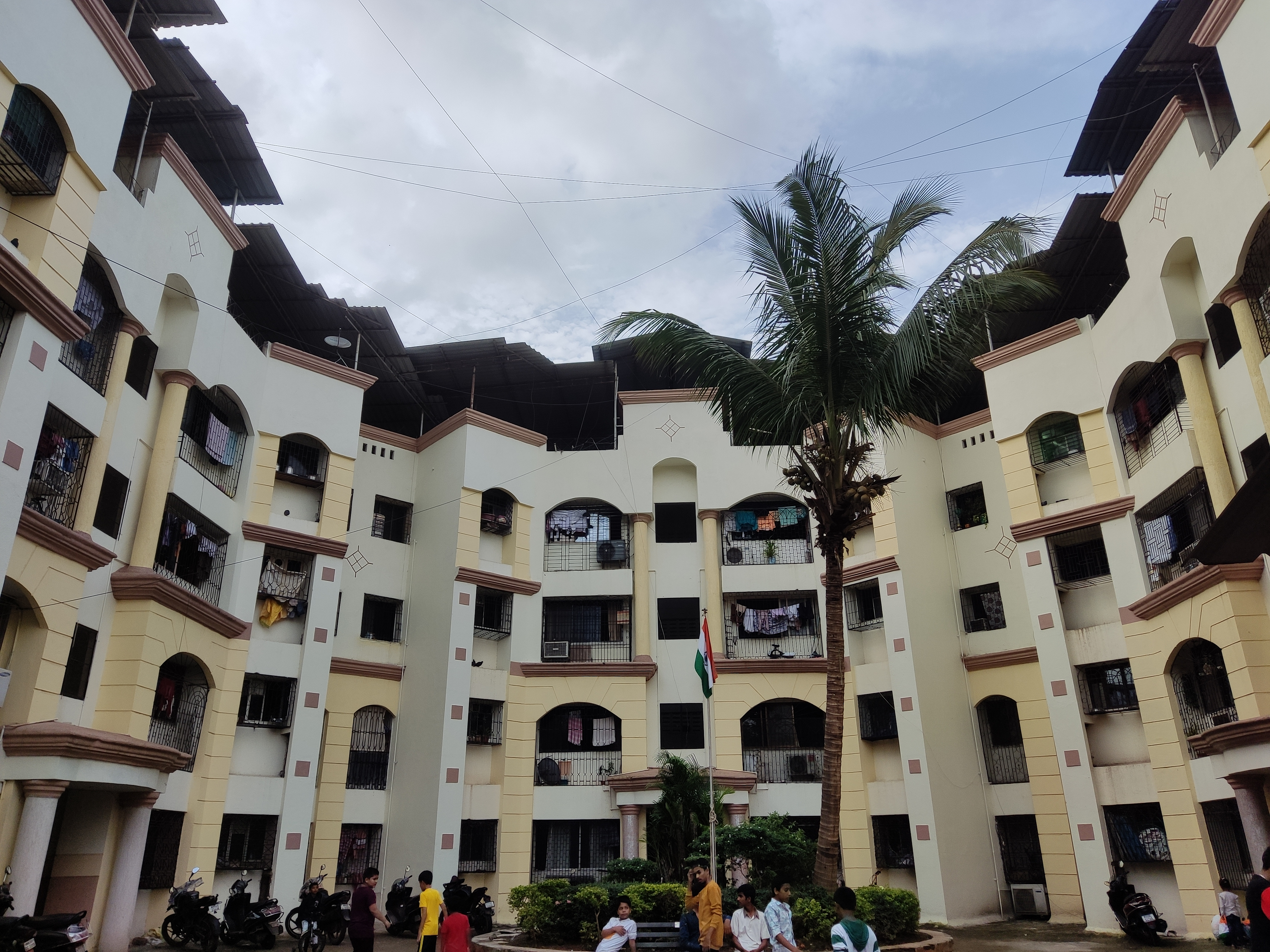
Wafa Hills, A-B-C society (Iconic Structure)

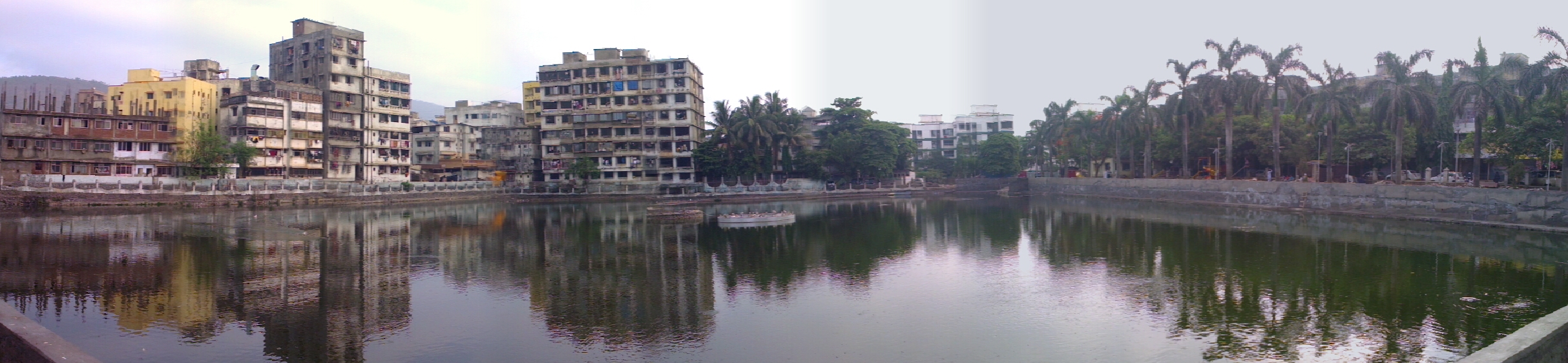
Kausa Talao at Mumbra

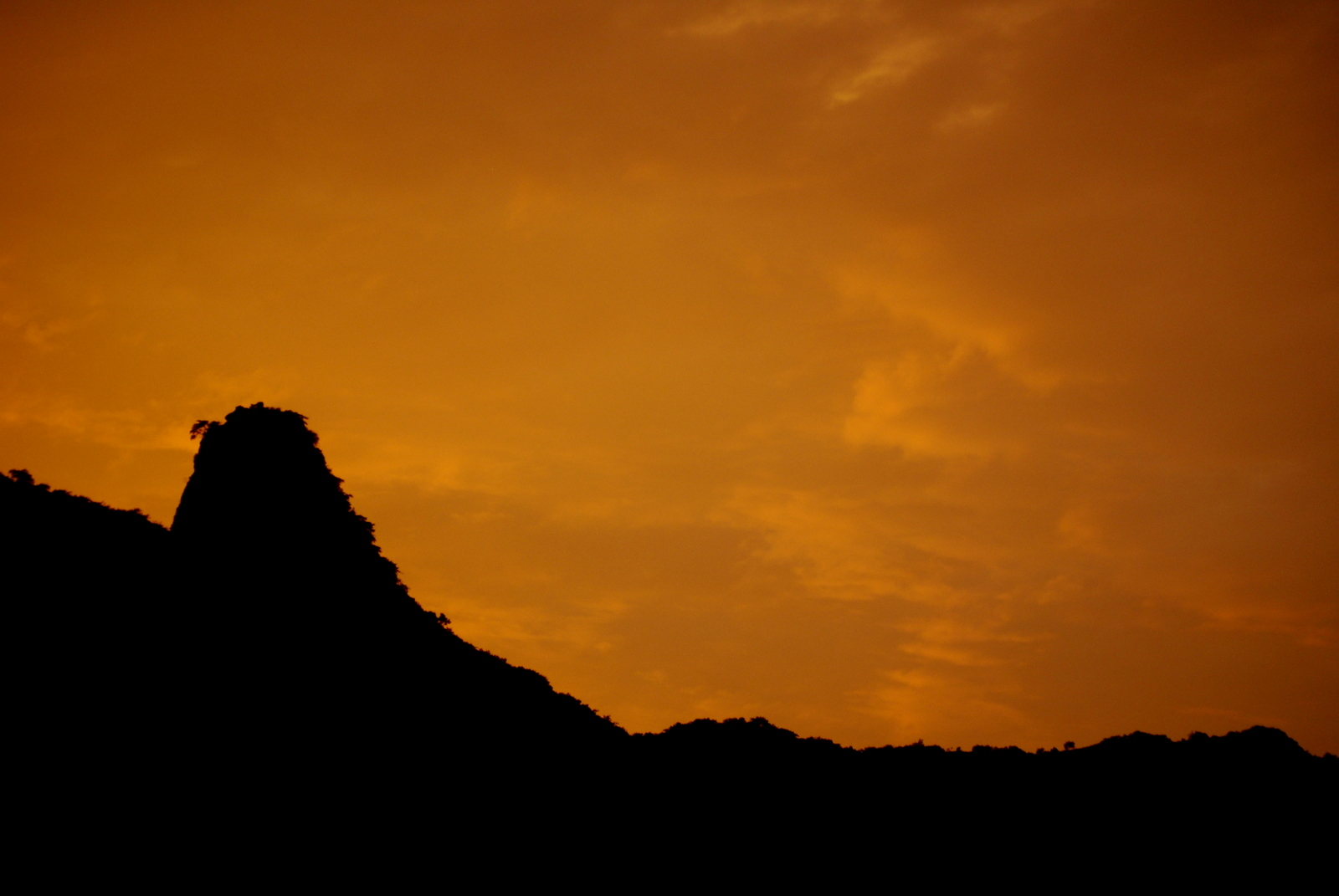
A peak

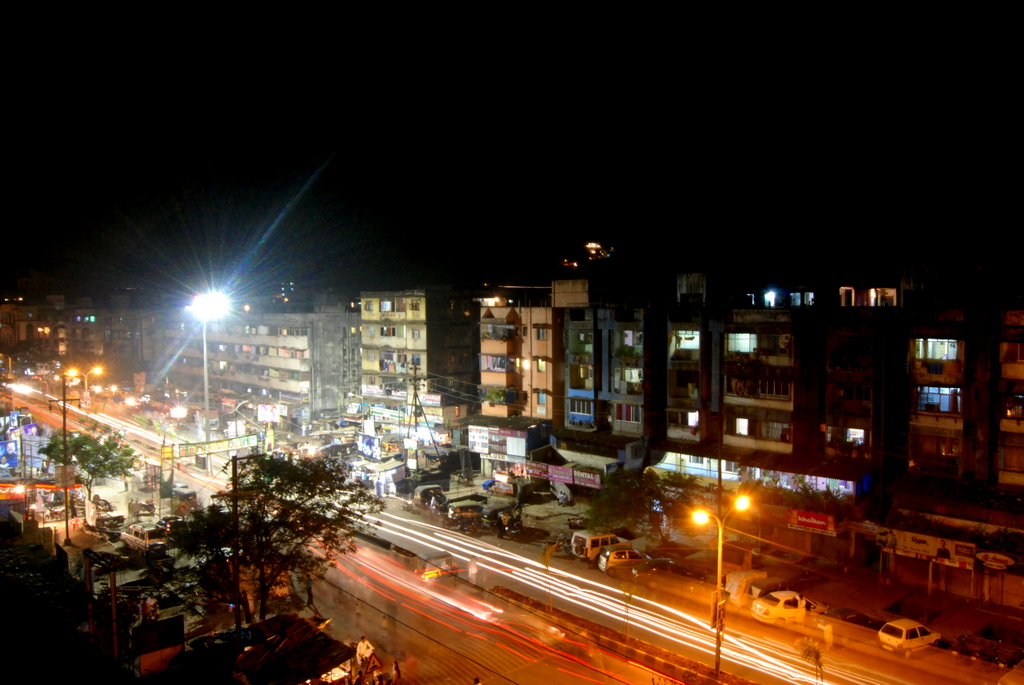
Amrut Nagar at Night

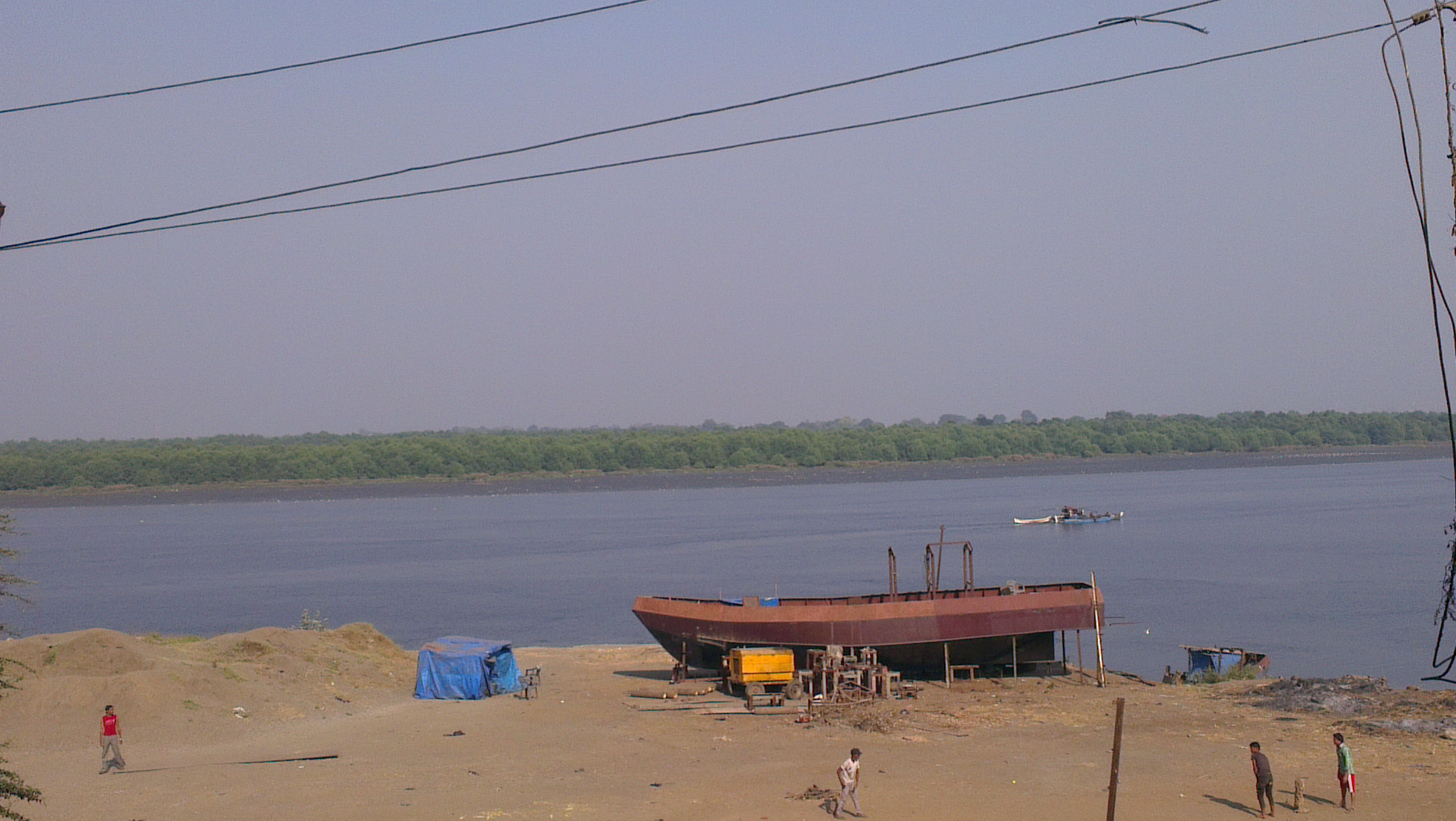
Ship Building Yard

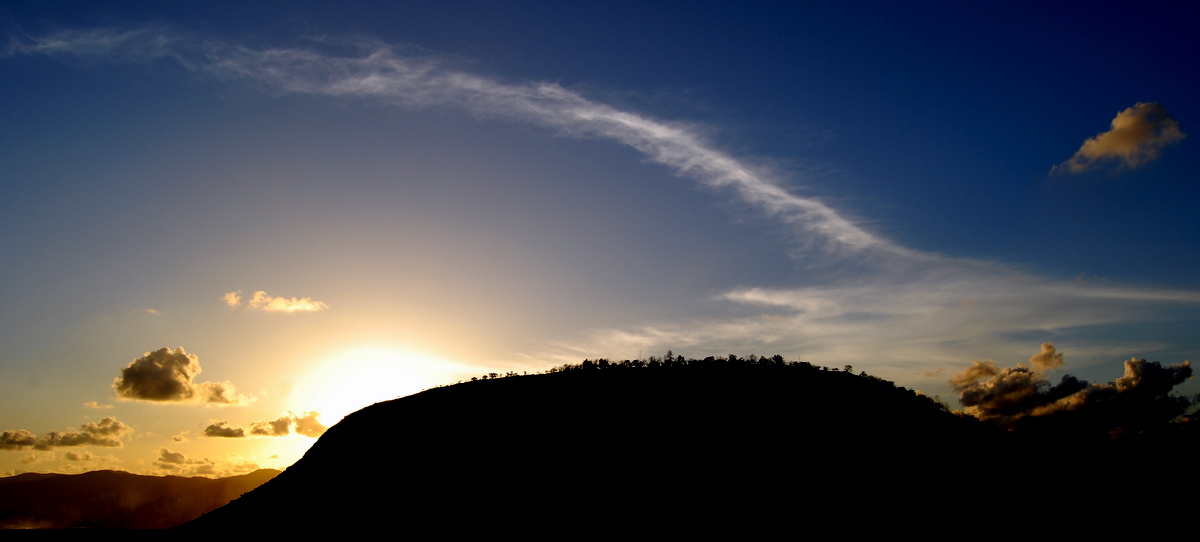
Mumbra sunset

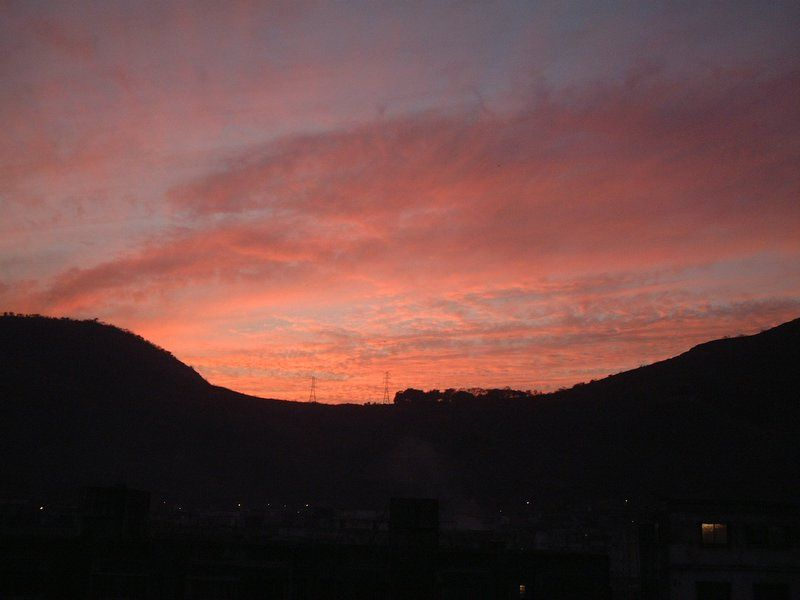
Mumbra sunset
