= Ramakant Madhvi =

Indian Politician

- रमाकांत मढवी

Deputy Mayor of Thane
- Incumbent
- Assumed office 2017
- Preceded by: Rajendra Sapte

Personal details
- Party: Shiv Sena

Ramakant Madhvi (Marathi: रमाकांत मढवी) is Shiv Sena Politician from Thane district, Maharashtra. He is the current Deputy Mayor of Thane Municipal Corporation.

== Positions held ==
- 2017: Elected as corporator in Thane Municipal Corporation
- 2017: Elected as Deputy Mayor of Thane Municipal Corporation
