= Rajendra Sapte =

Indian politician

Deputy Mayor of Thane
- In office 2014–2017
- Succeeded by: Ramakant Madhvi

Personal details
- Party: Shiv Sena

Rajendra Ramesh Sapte is a Shiv Sena politician from Thane district, Maharashtra. He was the Deputy Mayor of Thane Municipal Corporation from 2014 to 2017. He had been elected to Thane Municipal Corporation for four consecutive terms from 1997 to 2012.

== Positions held ==
- 1997: Elected as corporator in Thane Municipal Corporation
- 2002: Re-elected as corporator in Thane Municipal Corporation
- 2007: Re-elected as corporator in Thane Municipal Corporation
- 2012: Re-elected as corporator in Thane Municipal Corporation
- 2015: Elected as Deputy Mayor of Thane Municipal Corporation
