= List of constituencies of the Maharashtra Legislative Assembly =

Maharashtra Legislative Assembly
- 15th Maharashtra Assembly

Type
- Type: Lower house
- Term limits: 5 years
- Seats: 264

Elections
- Voting system: First past the post
- Last election: 2024

Meeting place
- Vidhan Bhavan, Mumbai, Summer Session; Vidhan Bhavan, Nagpur, Winter Session

Website
- mls.org.in

The Maharashtra Legislative Assembly is the lower house of bicameral state legislature of the Maharashtra state in India. Maharashtra came into existence on 1 May 1960. The number of constituencies of the first Maharashtra Legislative Assembly, the lower house of the Maharashtra state legislature in 1960 was 264. 33 constituencies were reserved for the candidates belonging to the Scheduled castes and 14 for the candidates belonging to the Scheduled tribes.

== List of current constituencies (since 2008) ==
Map of constituencies of Maharashtra Legislative Assembly

Following is the list of the constituencies of the Maharashtra Legislative Assembly since the delimitation of legislative assembly constituencies in 2008. At present, 29 constituencies are reserved for the candidates belonging to the Scheduled castes and 25 are reserved for the candidates belonging to the Scheduled tribes:

No.	Name	Reserved for (SC/ST/None)	District	Lok Sabha constituency
1	Akkalkuwa	ST	Nandurbar	Nandurbar
2	Shahada	ST	Nandurbar	Nandurbar
3	Nandurbar	ST	Nandurbar	Nandurbar
4	Navapur	ST	Nandurbar	Nandurbar
5	Sakri	ST	Dhule	Nandurbar
6	Dhule Rural	None	Dhule	Dhule
7	Dhule City	None	Dhule	Dhule
8	Sindkheda	None	Dhule	Dhule
9	Shirpur	ST	Dhule	Nandurbar
10	Chopda	ST	Jalgaon	Raver
11	Raver	None	Jalgaon	Raver
12	Bhusawal	SC	Jalgaon	Raver
13	Jalgaon City	None	Jalgaon	Jalgaon
14	Jalgaon Rural	None	Jalgaon	Jalgaon
15	Amalner	None	Jalgaon	Jalgaon
16	Erandol	None	Jalgaon	Jalgaon
17	Chalisgaon	None	Jalgaon	Jalgaon
18	Pachora	None	Jalgaon	Jalgaon
19	Jamner	None	Jalgaon	Raver
20	Muktainagar	None	Jalgaon	Raver
21	Malkapur	None	Buldhana	Raver
22	Buldhana	None	Buldhana	Buldhana
23	Chikhali	None	Buldhana	Buldhana
24	Sindkhed Raja	None	Buldhana	Buldhana
25	Mehkar	SC	Buldhana	Buldhana
26	Khamgaon	None	Buldhana	Buldhana
27	Jalgaon (Jamod)	None	Buldhana	Buldhana
28	Akot	None	Akola	Akola
29	Balapur	None	Akola	Akola
30	Akola West	None	Akola	Akola
31	Akola East	None	Akola	Akola
32	Murtizapur	SC	Akola	Akola
33	Risod	None	Washim	Akola
34	Washim	SC	Washim	Yavatmal–Washim
35	Karanja	None	Washim	Yavatmal–Washim
36	Dhamangaon Railway	None	Amravati	Wardha
37	Badnera	None	Amravati	Amravati
38	Amravati	None	Amravati	Amravati
39	Teosa	None	Amravati	Amravati
40	Daryapur	SC	Amravati	Amravati
41	Melghat	ST	Amravati	Amravati
42	Achalpur	None	Amravati	Amravati
43	Morshi	None	Amravati	Wardha
44	Arvi	None	Wardha	Wardha
45	Deoli	None	Wardha	Wardha
46	Hinganghat	None	Wardha	Wardha
47	Wardha	None	Wardha	Wardha
48	Katol	None	Nagpur	Ramtek
49	Savner	None	Nagpur	Ramtek
50	Hingna	None	Nagpur	Ramtek
51	Umred	SC	Nagpur	Ramtek
52	Nagpur South West	None	Nagpur	Nagpur
53	Nagpur South	None	Nagpur	Nagpur
54	Nagpur East	None	Nagpur	Nagpur
55	Nagpur Central	None	Nagpur	Nagpur
56	Nagpur West	None	Nagpur	Nagpur
57	Nagpur North	SC	Nagpur	Nagpur
58	Kamthi	None	Nagpur	Ramtek
59	Ramtek	None	Nagpur	Ramtek
60	Tumsar	None	Bhandara	Bhandara–Gondiya
61	Bhandara	SC	Bhandara	Bhandara–Gondiya
62	Sakoli	None	Bhandara	Bhandara–Gondiya
63	Arjuni-Morgaon	SC	Gondiya	Bhandara–Gondiya
64	Tirora	None	Gondiya	Bhandara–Gondiya
65	Gondiya	None	Gondiya	Bhandara–Gondiya
66	Amgaon	ST	Gondiya	Gadchiroli–Chimur
67	Armori	ST	Gadchiroli	Gadchiroli–Chimur
68	Gadchiroli	ST	Gadchiroli	Gadchiroli–Chimur
69	Aheri	ST	Gadchiroli	Gadchiroli–Chimur
70	Rajura	None	Chandrapur	Chandrapur
71	Chandrapur	SC	Chandrapur	Chandrapur
72	Ballarpur	None	Chandrapur	Chandrapur
73	Bramhapuri	None	Chandrapur	Gadchiroli–Chimur
74	Chimur	None	Chandrapur	Gadchiroli–Chimur
75	Warora	None	Chandrapur	Chandrapur
76	Wani	None	Yavatmal	Chandrapur
77	Ralegaon	ST	Yavatmal	Yavatmal–Washim
78	Yavatmal	None	Yavatmal	Yavatmal–Washim
79	Digras	None	Yavatmal	Yavatmal–Washim
80	Arni	ST	Yavatmal	Chandrapur
81	Pusad	None	Yavatmal	Yavatmal–Washim
82	Umarkhed	SC	Yavatmal	Hingoli
83	Kinwat	None	Nanded	Hingoli
84	Hadgaon	None	Nanded	Hingoli
85	Bhokar	None	Nanded	Nanded
86	Nanded North	None	Nanded	Nanded
87	Nanded South	None	Nanded	Nanded
88	Loha	None	Nanded	Latur
89	Naigaon	None	Nanded	Nanded
90	Deglur	SC	Nanded	Nanded
91	Mukhed	None	Nanded	Nanded
92	Basmath	None	Hingoli	Hingoli
93	Kalamnuri	None	Hingoli	Hingoli
94	Hingoli	None	Hingoli	Hingoli
95	Jintur	None	Parbhani	Parbhani
96	Parbhani	None	Parbhani	Parbhani
97	Gangakhed	None	Parbhani	Parbhani
98	Pathri	None	Parbhani	Parbhani
99	Partur	None	Jalna	Parbhani
100	Ghansawangi	None	Jalna	Parbhani
101	Jalna	None	Jalna	Jalna
102	Badnapur	SC	Jalna	Jalna
103	Bhokardan	None	Jalna	Jalna
104	Sillod	None	Aurangabad	Jalna
105	Kannad	None	Aurangabad	Aurangabad
106	Phulambri	None	Aurangabad	Aurangabad
107	Aurangabad Central	None	Aurangabad	Aurangabad
108	Aurangabad West	SC	Aurangabad	Aurangabad
109	Aurangabad East	None	Aurangabad	Aurangabad
110	Paithan	None	Aurangabad	Jalna
111	Gangapur	None	Aurangabad	Aurangabad
112	Vaijapur	None	Aurangabad	Aurangabad
113	Nandgaon	None	Nashik	Dindori
114	Malegaon Central	None	Nashik	Dhule
115	Malegaon Outer	None	Nashik	Dhule
116	Baglan	ST	Nashik	Dhule
117	Kalwan	ST	Nashik	Dindori
118	Chandwad	None	Nashik	Dindori
119	Yevla	None	Nashik	Dindori
120	Sinnar	None	Nashik	Nashik
121	Niphad	None	Nashik	Dindori
122	Dindori	ST	Nashik	Dindori
123	Nashik East	None	Nashik	Nashik
124	Nashik Central	None	Nashik	Nashik
125	Nashik West	None	Nashik	Nashik
126	Deolali	SC	Nashik	Nashik
127	Igatpuri	ST	Nashik	Nashik
128	Dahanu	ST	Palghar	Palghar
129	Vikramgad	ST	Palghar	Palghar
130	Palghar	ST	Palghar	Palghar
131	Boisar	ST	Palghar	Palghar
132	Nallasopara	None	Palghar	Palghar
133	Vasai	None	Palghar	Palghar
134	Bhiwandi Rural	ST	Thane	Bhiwandi
135	Shahapur	ST	Thane	Bhiwandi
136	Bhiwandi West	None	Thane	Bhiwandi
137	Bhiwandi East	None	Thane	Bhiwandi
138	Kalyan West	None	Thane	Bhiwandi
139	Murbad	None	Thane	Bhiwandi
140	Ambernath	SC	Thane	Kalyan
141	Ulhasnagar	None	Thane	Kalyan
142	Kalyan East	None	Thane	Kalyan
143	Dombivali	None	Thane	Kalyan
144	Kalyan Rural	None	Thane	Kalyan
145	Mira Bhayandar	None	Thane	Thane
146	Ovala-Majiwada	None	Thane	Thane
147	Kopri-Pachpakhadi	None	Thane	Thane
148	Thane	None	Thane	Thane
149	Mumbra-Kalwa	None	Thane	Kalyan
150	Airoli	None	Thane	Thane
151	Belapur	None	Thane	Thane
152	Borivali	None	Mumbai Suburban	Mumbai North
153	Dahisar	None	Mumbai Suburban	Mumbai North
154	Magathane	None	Mumbai Suburban	Mumbai North
155	Mulund	None	Mumbai Suburban	Mumbai North East
156	Vikhroli	None	Mumbai Suburban	Mumbai North East
157	Bhandup West	None	Mumbai Suburban	Mumbai North East
158	Jogeshwari East	None	Mumbai Suburban	Mumbai North West
159	Dindoshi	None	Mumbai Suburban	Mumbai North West
160	Kandivli East	None	Mumbai Suburban	Mumbai North
161	Charkop	None	Mumbai Suburban	Mumbai North
162	Malad West	None	Mumbai Suburban	Mumbai North
163	Goregaon	None	Mumbai Suburban	Mumbai North West
164	Versova	None	Mumbai Suburban	Mumbai North West
165	Andheri West	None	Mumbai Suburban	Mumbai North West
166	Andheri East	None	Mumbai Suburban	Mumbai North West
167	Vile Parle	None	Mumbai Suburban	Mumbai North Central
168	Chandivali	None	Mumbai Suburban	Mumbai North Central
169	Ghatkopar West	None	Mumbai Suburban	Mumbai North East
170	Ghatkopar East	None	Mumbai Suburban	Mumbai North East
171	Mankhurd Shivaji Nagar	None	Mumbai Suburban	Mumbai North East
172	Anushakti Nagar	None	Mumbai Suburban	Mumbai South Central
173	Chembur	None	Mumbai Suburban	Mumbai South Central
174	Kurla	SC	Mumbai Suburban	Mumbai North Central
175	Kalina	None	Mumbai Suburban	Mumbai North Central
176	Vandre East	None	Mumbai Suburban	Mumbai North Central
177	Vandre West	None	Mumbai Suburban	Mumbai North Central
178	Dharavi	SC	Mumbai City	Mumbai South Central
179	Sion Koliwada	None	Mumbai City	Mumbai South Central
180	Wadala	None	Mumbai City	Mumbai South Central
181	Mahim	None	Mumbai City	Mumbai South Central
182	Worli	None	Mumbai City	Mumbai South
183	Shivadi	None	Mumbai City	Mumbai South
184	Byculla	None	Mumbai City	Mumbai South
185	Malabar Hill	None	Mumbai City	Mumbai South
186	Mumbadevi	None	Mumbai City	Mumbai South
187	Colaba	None	Mumbai City	Mumbai South
188	Panvel	None	Raigad	Maval
189	Karjat	None	Raigad	Maval
190	Uran	None	Raigad	Maval
191	Pen	None	Raigad	Raigad
192	Alibag	None	Raigad	Raigad
193	Shrivardhan	None	Raigad	Raigad
194	Mahad	None	Raigad	Raigad
195	Junnar	None	Pune	Shirur
196	Ambegaon	None	Pune	Shirur
197	Khed Alandi	None	Pune	Shirur
198	Shirur	None	Pune	Shirur
199	Daund	None	Pune	Baramati
200	Indapur	None	Pune	Baramati
201	Baramati	None	Pune	Baramati
202	Purandar	None	Pune	Baramati
203	Bhor	None	Pune	Baramati
204	Maval	None	Pune	Maval
205	Chinchwad	None	Pune	Maval
206	Pimpri	SC	Pune	Maval
207	Bhosari	None	Pune	Shirur
208	Vadgaon Sheri	None	Pune	Pune
209	Shivajinagar	None	Pune	Pune
210	Kothrud	None	Pune	Pune
211	Khadakwasala	None	Pune	Baramati
212	Parvati	None	Pune	Pune
213	Hadapsar	None	Pune	Shirur
214	Pune Cantonment	SC	Pune	Pune
215	Kasba Peth	None	Pune	Pune
216	Akole	ST	Ahmednagar	Shirdi
217	Sangamner	None	Ahmednagar	Shirdi
218	Shirdi	None	Ahmednagar	Shirdi
219	Kopargaon	None	Ahmednagar	Shirdi
220	Shrirampur	SC	Ahmednagar	Shirdi
221	Nevasa	None	Ahmednagar	Shirdi
222	Shevgaon	None	Ahmednagar	Ahmednagar
223	Rahuri	None	Ahmednagar	Ahmednagar
224	Parner	None	Ahmednagar	Ahmednagar
225	Ahmednagar City	None	Ahmednagar	Ahmednagar
226	Shrigonda	None	Ahmednagar	Ahmednagar
227	Karjat Jamkhed	None	Ahmednagar	Ahmednagar
228	Georai	None	Beed	Beed
229	Majalgaon	None	Beed	Beed
230	Beed	None	Beed	Beed
231	Ashti	None	Beed	Beed
232	Kaij	SC	Beed	Beed
233	Parli	None	Beed	Beed
234	Latur Rural	None	Latur	Latur
235	Latur City	None	Latur	Latur
236	Ahmedpur	None	Latur	Latur
237	Udgir	SC	Latur	Latur
238	Nilanga	None	Latur	Latur
239	Ausa	None	Latur	Osmanabad
240	Umarga	SC	Osmanabad	Osmanabad
241	Tuljapur	None	Osmanabad	Osmanabad
242	Osmanabad	None	Osmanabad	Osmanabad
243	Paranda	None	Osmanabad	Osmanabad
244	Karmala	None	Solapur	Madha
245	Madha	None	Solapur	Madha
246	Barshi	None	Solapur	Osmanabad
247	Mohol	SC	Solapur	Solapur
248	Solapur City North	None	Solapur	Solapur
249	Solapur City Central	None	Solapur	Solapur
250	Akkalkot	None	Solapur	Solapur
251	Solapur South	None	Solapur	Solapur
252	Pandharpur	None	Solapur	Solapur
253	Sangola	None	Solapur	Madha
254	Malshiras	SC	Solapur	Madha
255	Phaltan	SC	Satara	Madha
256	Wai	None	Satara	Satara
257	Koregaon	None	Satara	Satara
258	Man	None	Satara	Satara
259	Karad North	None	Satara	Satara
260	Karad South	None	Satara	Satara
261	Patan	None	Satara	Satara
262	Satara	None	Satara	Satara
263	Dapoli	None	Ratnagiri	Raigad
264	Guhagar	None	Ratnagiri	Raigad
265	Chiplun	None	Ratnagiri	Ratnagiri–Sindhudurg
266	Ratnagiri	None	Ratnagiri	Ratnagiri–Sindhudurg
267	Rajapur	None	Ratnagiri	Ratnagiri–Sindhudurg
268	Kankavli	None	Sindhudurg	Ratnagiri–Sindhudurg
269	Kudal	None	Sindhudurg	Ratnagiri–Sindhudurg
270	Sawantwadi	None	Sindhudurg	Ratnagiri–Sindhudurg
271	Chandgad	None	Kolhapur	Kolhapur
272	Radhanagari	None	Kolhapur	Kolhapur
273	Kagal	None	Kolhapur	Kolhapur
274	Kolhapur South	None	Kolhapur	Kolhapur
275	Karvir	None	Kolhapur	Kolhapur
276	Kolhapur North	None	Kolhapur	Kolhapur
277	Shahuwadi	None	Kolhapur	Hatkanangle
278	Hatkanangle	SC	Kolhapur	Hatkanangle
279	Ichalkaranji	None	Kolhapur	Hatkanangle
280	Shirol	None	Kolhapur	Hatkanangle
281	Miraj	SC	Sangli	Sangli
282	Sangli	None	Sangli	Sangli
283	Islampur	None	Sangli	Hatkanangle
284	Shirala	None	Sangli	Hatkanangle
285	Palus-Kadegaon	None	Sangli	Sangli
286	Khanapur	None	Sangli	Sangli
287	Tasgaon-Kavathe Mahankal	None	Sangli	Sangli
288	Jat	None	Sangli	Sangli

== List of former constituencies (made defunct by 2008) ==
Number	Name	District
1	Adyar	Bhandara district
2	Ahmednagar North	Ahmednagar district
3	Ahmednagar South	Ahmednagar district
4	Akola	Akola district
5	Akrani (ST)	Nandurbar district
6	Ambad	Jalna district
7	Amboli	Mumbai Suburban district
8	Andheri	Mumbai Suburban district
9	Bandra	Mumbai Suburban district
10	Bhadrawati	Chandrapur district
11	Bhandup	Mumbai Suburban district
12	Bhavani Peth	Pune District
13	Bhilwadi Wangi	Sangli district
14	Bhiwandi	Thane district
15	Biloli	Nanded district
16	Bopodi	Pune District
17	Borgaon Manju	Akola district
18	Chandur	Amravati district
19	Chausala	Beed district
20	Chinchpokli	Mumbai City district
21	Dabhadi	Nashik district
22	Dadar	Mumbai City district
23	Darwha	Yavatmal district
24	Deogad	Sindhudurg district
25	Dhule	Dhule district
26	Gadhinglaj	Kolhapur district
27	Ghatkopar	Mumbai Suburban district
28	Girgaon	Mumbai City district
29	Goregaon	Gondia district
30	Haveli	Pune District
31	Her (SC)	Latur district
32	Jalamb	Buldhana district
33	Jalgaon	Jalgaon district
33	Jaoli	Satara district
34	Jawhar (ST)	Palghar district
35	Kalamb (SC)	Osmanabad district
36	Kalmeshwar	Nagpur district
37	Kalyan	Thane district
38	Kandhar	Nanded district
39	Kandivali	Mumbai Suburban district
40	Kavathe Mahankal	Sangli District
41	Kelapur (ST)	Yavatmal district
42	Khalapur	Raigad district
43	Khatav	Satara district
44	Khed	Ratnagiri district
45	Kherwadi	Mumbai Suburban district
46	Khetwadi	Mumbai City district
47	Kolhapur	Kolhapur district
48	Kusumba	Dhule district
49	Lakhandur	Bhandara district
50	Malad	Mumbai Suburban district
51	Malegaon	Nashik district
52	Malvan	Sindhudurg district
53	Mangalwedha (SC)	Solapur district
54	Mangaon	Raigad district
55	Mangrulpir	Washim district
56	Matunga	Mumbai City district
57	Mazgaon	Mumbai City district
58	Medshi	Washim district
59	Mudkhed	Nanded district
60	Mulshi	Pune district
61	Nagar–Akola (ST)	Ahmednagar district
62	Nagpada	Mumbai City district
63	Naigaum	Mumbai City district
64	Nanded	Nanded District
65	Nashik	Nashik district
66	Nehrunagar	Mumbai Suburban district
67	North Solapur (SC)	Solapur district
68	Opera House	Mumbai City district
69	Panhala	Kolhapur district
70	Parel	Mumbai City district
71	Parola	Jalgaon district
72	Pathardi	Ahmednagar district
73	Pulgaon	Wardha District
74	Renapur	Latur district
75	Sangameshwar	Ratnagiri district
76	Sangrul	Kolhapur District
77	Santacruz	Mumbai Suburban district
78	Saoli	Chandrapur district
79	Singnapur	Parbhani district
80	Sironcha (ST)	Gadchiroli district
81	Shukrawar Peth	Pune District
82	Solapur City South	Solapur district
83	Surgana (ST)	Nashik district
84	Talode (ST)	Nandurbar district
85	Tasgaon	Sangli District
86	Trombay	Mumbai Suburban district
87	Umarkhadi	Mumbai City district
88	Vadgaon (SC)	Kolhapur district
89	Vengurla	Sindhudurg district
90	Wada (ST)	Palghar district
91	Walgaon	Amravati district
92	Walva	Sangli District
93	Yaval	Jalgaon district

== See also ==
- Maharashtra Legislative Assembly
