= Lonar Assembly constituency =

Constituency of the Maharashtra legislative assembly in India

Lonar
- Former constituency for the Maharashtra Legislative Assembly

Constituency details
- Country: India
- Region: Western India
- State: Maharashtra
- Established: 1964
- Abolished: 1976
- Total electors: 96,034
- Reservation: None

Lonar Assembly constituency was an assembly constituency in the India state of Maharashtra.

== Members of the Legislative Assembly ==
Election	Member	Party
1967	K. T. Sangle	Indian National Congress
1972	Jagarao Raoji Chavan	Indian National Congress

== Election results ==
=== Assembly Election 1972 ===
1972 Maharashtra Legislative Assembly election : Lonar
Party	Candidate	Votes	%	±%
INC	Jagarao Raoji Chavan	25,452	46.03%	▼4.04
Independent	Sahebrao Bhaurao Mapari	20,406	36.90%	New
RPI	Gopalrao Sakharam Jadhao	5,880	10.63%	▼13.83
Independent	Pratap Govinda Narwade	1,359	2.46%	New
Margin of victory		5,046	9.12%	▼16.47
Turnout		55,300	55.29%	▼14.57
Registered electors		96,034		▲12.35
INC hold		Swing	▼4.04	

=== Assembly Election 1967 ===
1967 Maharashtra Legislative Assembly election : Lonar
Party	Candidate	Votes	%	±%
INC	K. T. Sangle	30,874	50.06%	New
RPI	Sahebrao Bhaurao Mapari	15,089	24.47%	New
ABJS	A. N. Deshmukh	9,992	16.20%	New
Independent	B. D. Borde	998	1.62%	New
Margin of victory		15,785	25.60%	
Turnout		61,672	66.63%	
Registered electors		85,478		
INC win (new seat)				
