= Edlabad Assembly constituency =

Constituency of the Maharashtra legislative assembly in India

Edlabad
- Former constituency for the Maharashtra Legislative Assembly

Constituency details
- Country: India
- Region: Western India
- State: Maharashtra
- Established: 1952
- Abolished: 2008
- Total electors: 191,398

Edlabad Assembly constituency was an assembly constituency in the India state of Maharashtra.

== Members of the Legislative Assembly ==
Election	Member	Party
1952	Patil Eknathrao Sampatrao	Indian National Congress
1962	Hiralal Indal Kalyani	Indian National Congress
1967	Pratibha Patil	Indian National Congress
1972	Pratibha Patil	Indian National Congress
1978	Pratibha Patil	Indian National Congress
1980	Pratibha Patil	Indian National Congress
1985	Jaware Haribhau Dagadu	Indian Congress
1990	Eknath Khadse	Bharatiya Janata Party
1995	Eknath Khadse	Bharatiya Janata Party
1999	Eknath Khadse	Bharatiya Janata Party
2004	Eknath Khadse	Bharatiya Janata Party

== Election results ==
=== Assembly Election 2004 ===
2004 Maharashtra Legislative Assembly election : Edlabad
Party	Candidate	Votes	%	±%
BJP	Eknath Khadse	69,006	47.74%	▼1.31
NCP	Ravindra Pralhadrao Patil	67,157	46.46%	▲18.16
BSP	Prabhakar Kashiram Patil	3,091	2.14%	New
Peoples Republican Party	Sagrishsa Roshansha	2,528	1.75%	New
BBM	Ingale Suresh Hiraman	2,076	1.44%	New
Margin of victory		1,849	1.28%	▼19.47
Turnout		144,557	75.53%	▲2.85
Total valid votes		144,555		
Registered electors		191,398		▲9.78
BJP hold		Swing	▼1.31	

=== Assembly Election 1999 ===
1999 Maharashtra Legislative Assembly election : Edlabad
Party	Candidate	Votes	%	±%
BJP	Eknath Khadse	59,223	49.05%	▼2.54
NCP	Ravindra Pralhadrao Patil	34,167	28.30%	New
INC	Patil Gajendrasing Narayan	26,676	22.09%	▼16.00
Margin of victory		25,056	20.75%	▲7.25
Turnout		126,708	72.68%	▼7.72
Total valid votes		120,740		
Registered electors		174,341		▲5.09
BJP hold		Swing	▼2.54	

=== Assembly Election 1995 ===
1995 Maharashtra Legislative Assembly election : Edlabad
Party	Candidate	Votes	%	±%
BJP	Eknath Khadse	67,086	51.59%	▲16.73
INC	Patil Ravindra Pralhadrao	49,527	38.09%	▲5.88
BBM	Sapkale Hari Daya Ram	9,144	7.03%	New
Independent	Selke Dagadu Eknath	1,482	1.14%	New
Doordarshi Party	Kale Pushpa Shirish	1,051	0.81%	New
Margin of victory		17,559	13.50%	▲10.85
Turnout		133,385	80.40%	▲12.96
Total valid votes		130,042		
Registered electors		165,903		▲9.22
BJP hold		Swing	▲16.73	

=== Assembly Election 1990 ===
1990 Maharashtra Legislative Assembly election : Edlabad
Party	Candidate	Votes	%	±%
BJP	Eknath Khadse	35,052	34.86%	New
INC	G. N. Patil	32,390	32.21%	▼11.12
INS(SCS)	Jaware Haribhan Dagadu	30,853	30.68%	New
JD	Kamal Dagadu	1,073	1.07%	New
Margin of victory		2,662	2.65%	▼5.51
Turnout		102,443	67.44%	▲1.92
Total valid votes		100,552		
Registered electors		151,903		▲21.00
BJP gain from IC(S)		Swing	▼16.63	

=== Assembly Election 1985 ===
1985 Maharashtra Legislative Assembly election : Edlabad
Party	Candidate	Votes	%	±%
IC(S)	Jaware Haribhau Dagadu	41,546	51.49%	New
INC	Choudhari Ramakant Vasudev	34,963	43.33%	New
Independent	Surwade Pandhari Nath Lingaji	2,060	2.55%	New
Independent	Gosari Baliram Rampuri	675	0.84%	New
Independent	Ingale Bhopalu Ramchandra	662	0.82%	New
Margin of victory		6,583	8.16%	▼9.03
Turnout		82,251	65.52%	▼1.01
Total valid votes		80,688		
Registered electors		125,541		▲10.87
IC(S) gain from INC(I)		Swing	▲3.48	

=== Assembly Election 1980 ===
1980 Maharashtra Legislative Assembly election : Edlabad
Party	Candidate	Votes	%	±%
INC(I)	Pratibha Patil	35,382	48.01%	▲39.40
INC(U)	Patil Pralhadrao Eknathrao	22,714	30.82%	New
BJP	Ashok Devidas Phadke	15,595	21.16%	New
Margin of victory		12,668	17.19%	▲16.24
Turnout		75,330	66.53%	▼6.50
Total valid votes		73,691		
Registered electors		113,228		▲8.23
INC(I) gain from INC		Swing	▲5.14	

=== Assembly Election 1978 ===
1978 Maharashtra Legislative Assembly election : Edlabad
Party	Candidate	Votes	%	±%
INC	Pratibha Patil	31,578	42.87%	▼47.50
JP	Ashok Devidas Phadke	30,879	41.92%	New
INC(I)	Deshmukh Ravindra Shivrao	6,343	8.61%	New
Independent	Tukaram Laxman More	2,436	3.31%	New
PWPI	Pandit Anjanabai Sonu	2,044	2.77%	New
Margin of victory		699	0.95%	▼79.78
Turnout		76,404	73.03%	▲15.12
Total valid votes		73,668		
Registered electors		104,622		▲22.34
INC hold		Swing	▼47.50	

=== Assembly Election 1972 ===
1972 Maharashtra Legislative Assembly election : Edlabad
Party	Candidate	Votes	%	±%
INC	Pratibha Patil	42,975	90.37%	▲39.21
RPI	Yashvant Dhana Medhe	4,582	9.63%	New
Margin of victory		38,393	80.73%	▲46.01
Turnout		49,527	57.91%	▼4.74
Total valid votes		47,557		
Registered electors		85,517		▲14.07
INC hold		Swing	▲39.21	

=== Assembly Election 1967 ===
1967 Maharashtra Legislative Assembly election : Edlabad
Party	Candidate	Votes	%	±%
INC	Pratibha Patil	21,559	51.16%	▼12.86
ABJS	R. S. Pawar	6,927	16.44%	New
PWPI	A. S. Pandit	6,082	14.43%	New
Independent	B. J. Deshmukh	4,434	10.52%	New
PSP	N. U. Patil	1,687	4.00%	New
SWA	W. S. Kharate	741	1.76%	New
Independent	Dayaram Ramji Bodade	713	1.69%	New
Margin of victory		14,632	34.72%	▼8.86
Turnout		46,966	62.65%	▲6.01
Total valid votes		42,143		
Registered electors		74,966		▲2.56
INC hold		Swing	▼12.86	

=== Assembly Election 1962 ===
1962 Maharashtra Legislative Assembly election : Edlabad
Party	Candidate	Votes	%	±%
INC	Hiralal Indal Kalyani	24,014	64.02%	▲14.89
RPI	Bhalerao Trambak Senu	7,666	20.44%	New
ABJS	Zendu Ganpat Kalaskar	4,203	11.21%	New
Independent	Dayaram Ramji Bodade	1,627	4.34%	New
Margin of victory		16,348	43.58%	▲9.80
Turnout		41,399	56.64%	▲3.10
Total valid votes		37,510		
Registered electors		73,097		▲46.96
INC hold		Swing	▲14.89	

=== Assembly Election 1952 ===
1952 Bombay State Legislative Assembly election : Edlabad
Party	Candidate	Votes	%	±%
INC	Patil Eknathrao Sampatrao	13,084	49.13%	New
Socialist	Deshmukh Damodar Vishnu	4,087	15.35%	New
PWPI	Pandit Sonu Ananda	4,015	15.08%	New
Independent	Dabhaiwala Hormasji Dadabhoy	3,743	14.05%	New
Independent	Deshmukh Gunvantrao Jijabrao	1,703	6.39%	New
Margin of victory		8,997	33.78%	
Turnout		26,632	53.54%	
Total valid votes		26,632		
Registered electors		49,741		
INC win (new seat)				
