= Jalna South Assembly constituency =

Constituency of the Maharashtra legislative assembly in India

Jalna South
- Former constituency for the Maharashtra Legislative Assembly

Constituency details
- Country: India
- Region: Western India
- State: Maharashtra
- Established: 1967
- Abolished: 1978
- Total electors: 97,102

Jalna South Assembly constituency was an assembly constituency in the India state of Maharashtra.

== Members of the Legislative Assembly ==
Election	Member	Party
1967	R. B. Lala	Sanghata Socialist Party
1972	R. S. Rao Raghunath	Indian National Congress

== Election results ==
=== Assembly Election 1972 ===
1972 Maharashtra Legislative Assembly election : Jalna South
Party	Candidate	Votes	%	±%
INC	R. S. Rao Raghunath	22,062	45.75%	▲14.70
Independent	Gopichand Dukhi	9,719	20.15%	New
SSP	R. Bhagulala Jaiswal	5,810	12.05%	New
ABJS	Biyan S Parmanand	4,098	8.50%	▼7.98
Independent	M. Yadavrao Jalgaonkar	2,204	4.57%	New
RPI	Kuril Bansilal Ramcharan	2,017	4.18%	New
Margin of victory		12,343	25.59%	▲22.39
Turnout		48,225	47.57%	▲4.00
Registered electors		97,102		▲19.45
INC gain from SSP		Swing	▲11.49	

=== Assembly Election 1967 ===
1967 Maharashtra Legislative Assembly election : Jalna South
Party	Candidate	Votes	%	±%
SSP	R. B. Lala	12,716	34.26%	New
INC	B. Narayan	11,525	31.05%	New
ABJS	B. S. Patil	6,117	16.48%	New
Independent	E. Nnarsayya	1,706	4.60%	New
Independent	R. Vishram	990	2.67%	New
Independent	S. Raghunath	876	2.36%	New
Margin of victory		1,191	3.21%	
Turnout		37,118	41.74%	
Registered electors		81,292		
SSP win (new seat)				
