= Chandor Assembly constituency =

Constituency of the Maharashtra legislative assembly in India

Chandor
- Former constituency for the Maharashtra Legislative Assembly

Constituency details
- Country: India
- Region: Western India
- State: Maharashtra
- Established: 1967
- Abolished: 1976
- Total electors: 92,839
- Reservation: None

Chandor Assembly constituency was an assembly constituency in the India state of Maharashtra.

== Members of the Legislative Assembly ==
Election	Member	Party
1967	R. G. Gunjal	Indian National Congress
1972	Janardan Kedu Aher	Independent politician

== Election results ==
=== Assembly Election 1972 ===
1972 Maharashtra Legislative Assembly election : Chandor
Party	Candidate	Votes	%	±%
Independent	Janardan Kedu Aher	25,665	47.34%	New
INC	Madhukarrao S. Sonawane	25,530	47.09%	▲7.40
CPI(M)	Bhikaji Nathu Deshmane	1,464	2.70%	▼24.12
Independent	Naraharpani K. Thakare	1,275	2.35%	New
Margin of victory		135	0.25%	▼7.59
Turnout		56,160	60.49%	▼3.56
Total valid votes		54,216		
Registered electors		92,839		▲20.07
Independent gain from INC		Swing	▲7.65	

=== Assembly Election 1967 ===
1967 Maharashtra Legislative Assembly election : Chandor
Party	Candidate	Votes	%	±%
INC	R. G. Gunjal	17,769	39.69%	New
Independent	S. B. Nikam	14,259	31.85%	New
CPI(M)	F. S. Dawkhar	12,006	26.82%	New
Independent	S. D. Ahire	736	1.64%	New
Margin of victory		3,510	7.84%	
Turnout		49,523	64.05%	
Total valid votes		44,770		
Registered electors		77,322		
INC win (new seat)				
