= 1972 Maharashtra Legislative Assembly election =

Indian state election

Maharashtra State Assembly Elections, 1972
- 5 March 1972

All 270 assembly constituencies to Maharashtra Legislative Assembly 136 seats needed for a majority
- Turnout: 60.63% (▼4.21%)
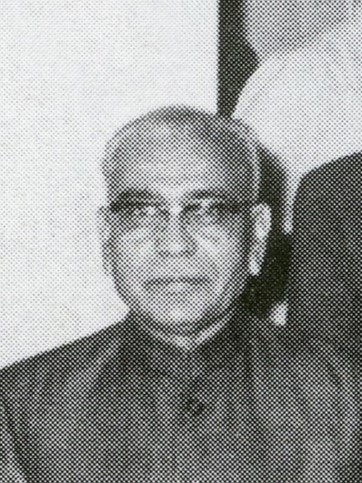
	Majority party	Minority party
		PWPI
Party	INC(R)	PWPI
Last election	203 seats, 47.03%	19 seats, 7.80%
Seats won	222	7
Seat change	▲19	▼12
Popular vote	8,535,832	856,986
Percentage	56.36%	5.66%
Swing	▲9.33%	▼2.14%
Chief Minister before election
Vasantrao Naik
INC
Elected Chief Minister
Vasantrao Naik
INC

The 1972 Maharashtra State Assembly election was held in March 1972 for the fourth term of the Maharashtra Vidhan Sabha. A total of 270 seats were contested.

The Indian National Congress won the largest number of seats and a majority. Vasantrao Naik, the incumbent Chief Minister was reelected. S. K. Wankhede became Speaker of the Legislative Assembly and Ramkrishna Vyankatesh Bet became Deputy Speaker. Dinkar Balu Patil became the leader of the opposition.

== List of participating political parties ==
Party	Abbreviation
National Parties
Akhil Bharatiya Jana Sangh	BJS
Swatantra Party	SWA
Indian National Congress	INC(R)
Indian National Congress (Organisation)	INC(O)
Socialist Party of India	SSP
Communist Party of India (Marxist)	CPM
Communist Party of India	CPI
State Parties
Indian Union Muslim League	IUML
Bharatiya Kranti Dal	BKD
Peasants and Workers Party	PWP
All India Forward Bloc	AIFB
Republican Party of India	RPI
Registered (Unrecognised) Parties
Akhil Bharatiya Hindu Mahasabha	HMS
Shiv Sena	SHS
Republican Party of India (Khobragade)	RPK/RPI(K)

== Results ==
=== Party results ===
Summary of results of the Maharashtra State Assembly election, 1972
Political Party	No. of candidates	No. of elected	Seat change	Number of Votes	% of Votes	Change in vote %
Indian National Congress 222 / 270 (82%)	271	222	▲19	8,535,832	56.36%	▲9.33%
Peasants and Workers Party of India 7 / 270 (3%)	58	7	▼12	856,986	5.66%	▼2.14%
Bharatiya Jana Sangh 5 / 270 (2%)	122	5	▲1	947,266	6.25%	▼1.92%
Samyukta Socialist Party/Socialist Party 3 / 270 (1%)	52	3	▼1	693,797	4.58%	▼0.03%
Republican Party of India 2 / 270 (0.7%)	118	2	▼3	570,533	3.77%	▼2.89%
Communist Party of India 2 / 270 (0.7%)	44	2	▼8	412,857	2.73%	▼2.14%
All India Forward Bloc 2 / 270 (0.7%)	26	2	▲2	363,547	2.40%	▲2.40% (New Party)
Shiv Sena 1 / 270 (0.4%)	26	1	▲1	279,210	1.84%	▲1.84% (New Party)
Communist Party of India (Marxist) 1 / 270 (0.4%)	20	1	Steady	117,134	0.77%	▼0.31%
Bharatiya Kranti Dal 1 / 270 (0.4%)	2	1	▲1	31,508	0.21%	▲0.21% (New Party)
Indian Union Muslim League 1 / 270 (0.4%)	1	1	▲1	27,138	0.18%	▲0.18% (New Party)
Republican Party of India (Khobragade)	56	0	(New Party)	202,935	1.34%	▲1.34% (New Party)
Indian National Congress (Organisation)	49	0	(Split in INC)	162,433	1.07%	(Split in INC)
Swatantra Party	5	0	Steady	14,269	0.09%	▼1.03%
Independents 23 / 270 (9%)	343	23	▲7	1,920,667	12.68%	▼1.89%
Total	1196	270	Steady	15,146,171	60.63%	▼4.21%

=== Results by constituency ===
Winner, runner-up, voter turnout, and victory margin in every constituency
Assembly Constituency		Turnout	Winner				Runner Up				Margin
#k	Names	%	Candidate	Party	Votes	%	Candidate	Party	Votes	%	Margin
1	Sawantwadi	59.94%	Pratap Rao Deo Rao Bhosale	INC	27,647	62.67%	Jaya Nand Shiv Ram Mathkar	SSP	10,747	24.36%	16,900
2	Vengurla	63.97%	Sitaram Narayan Desai	INC	28,655	62.85%	Pundalik A. Kinalekar	SSP	11,356	24.91%	17,299
3	Kankavli	61.77%	K. Vyankateshrao Rane	INC	28,268	66.42%	Sitaram Sakharam Sawant	PWPI	13,376	31.43%	14,892
4	Malvan	63.30%	Vijay Singh G. Prabhugaokar	INC	23,386	60.65%	Shyam Gangaram Kocharekar	SSP	13,166	34.14%	10,220
5	Deogad	61.24%	Mirashi Rajabhau Govind	INC	26,918	66.19%	Satam Vasant Sadashiv	ABJS	6,279	15.44%	20,639
6	Rajapur	62.34%	Sahadev Mukund Thakre	INC	22,006	51.73%	Laxman Rangnath Hatankar	SSP	19,761	46.46%	2,245
7	Lanja	56.93%	Shiwajirao Sawant	INC	21,939	60.34%	Jagannathrao Jadhao	SSP	11,308	31.10%	10,631
8	Ratnagiri	54.65%	Hassnain S. E.	INC	22,325	52.34%	Niwendkar V. Krishnaji	ABJS	13,395	31.40%	8,930
9	Sangameshwar	49.44%	Bhuwad Laxmibai Babaji	INC	21,952	54.46%	Bhide S. Dattatray	ABJS	9,186	22.79%	12,766
10	Chiplun	51.35%	P. K. Sawant	INC	34,379	85.63%	Rajaram Gangaram Ghag	ABJS	5,767	14.37%	28,612
11	Guhagar	60.85%	Shridhar Dattatray Natu	ABJS	22,145	48.23%	Ramchandra S. Bendal	INC	19,866	43.27%	2,279
12	Khed	55.57%	Husen Dalwai	INC	30,081	68.47%	Palane Madhao Ramajee	ABJS	5,196	11.83%	24,885
13	Dapoli	70.23%	Ramchandra Vithal Bhelose	INC	30,221	54.10%	Sakpal Gangaram Daulat	Independent	25,637	45.90%	4,584
14	Mahad	61.25%	Digambar Vinayak	SSP	27,737	55.32%	Kamal Vichare	INC	22,401	44.68%	5,336
15	Shrivardhan	62.53%	A. R. Antulay	INC	47,290	84.30%	Anna Thosar	ABJS	8,808	15.70%	38,482
16	Mangaon	-	Mahalunge Ram Vithal	INC	Elected Unopposed						
17	Pen	74.50%	Ambaji Tukaram Patil	Independent	41,892	66.30%	Mohan Mahadeo Patil	INC	21,293	33.70%	20,599
18	Alibag	70.49%	Narayan Kanhoba Bhagat	INC	22,279	38.62%	Vasant Rajaram Raut	PWPI	18,685	32.39%	3,594
19	Panvel	67.93%	Dinkar Patil	PWPI	32,980	56.63%	Gopal Govind Patil	INC	25,255	43.37%	7,725
20	Khalapur	54.32%	Balkrishna Limbaji Patil	INC	28,381	58.96%	Vishnu Narayan Thanage	PWPI	14,636	30.41%	13,745
21	Colaba	52.82%	Aloo Jal Chibber	INC	27,141	73.38%	Jamitram Kashiram Joshi	INC(O)	8,075	21.83%	19,066
22	Dhobitalao	56.51%	Popat Mohanlal Bhavanbhai	INC	25,259	60.10%	Vinod Chhajuram Gupta	ABJS	8,853	21.06%	16,406
23	Girgaon	67.22%	Pramod Navalkar	SS	25,636	50.76%	Khadikar Y. Vinayak	INC	24,867	49.24%	769
24	Kumbharwada	61.64%	Bukhari Z. Burhanuddin	Independent	18,145	37.03%	Chagla Shaukat Currimbhoy	INC	16,058	32.77%	2,087
25	Umarkhadi	64.44%	G. M. H. Noormohamad	AIML	27,138	51.93%	Miya Ahmed Latif	INC	21,121	40.42%	6,017
26	Mazgaon	59.20%	Toraskar Krishnaji	INC	30,290	64.85%	Bhai Shingre	SS	6,876	14.72%	23,414
27	Nagpada	66.02%	Kazi Umar Abdul Aziz	INC	21,293	37.06%	Khwaja Gulam Jilani	Independent	19,502	33.94%	1,791
28	Khetwadi	61.30%	Anant Namjoshi	INC	29,075	59.69%	Lakh Ni Jivanlal Mulchand	ABJS	9,171	18.83%	19,904
29	Walkeshwar	58.31%	Harishkumar N. Trivedi	INC	36,416	59.85%	J. Navichandra Mehta	ABJS	24,431	40.15%	11,985
30	Byculla	61.22%	Hoshing Vasant Rangnath	INC	25,049	45.97%	Ganacharya G. Bhaurao	CPI	22,159	40.67%	2,890
31	Love Grove	63.60%	Ramchander A. Khaire	INC	46,402	64.62%	Narendra Devdas Jadhav	SS	10,990	15.31%	35,412
32	Worli	68.98%	Sharad Dighe	INC	38,000	53.91%	Nalawade Datta Shankar	SS	13,126	18.62%	24,874
33	Parel	72.72%	Gajanan Shankar Loke	INC	34,310	50.99%	Vaman Shivram Mahadik	SS	24,451	36.34%	9,859
34	Sewree	69.28%	A. T. Alias Bhai Bhosle	INC	35,705	51.25%	Dattaji Salvi	SS	16,785	24.09%	18,920
35	Naigaon	70.76%	Vilas Vishnu Sawant	INC	28,880	44.39%	Ram Arjun Mahadik	SSP	17,352	26.67%	11,528
36	Dadar	72.64%	Waman Shankar Matkar	INC	30,292	42.92%	Sudhir Gajanan Joshi	SS	13,724	19.45%	16,568
37	Mahim	70.35%	Frederick Michael Pinto	INC	39,508	63.61%	Hemchandra Gupte	SS	21,167	34.08%	18,341
38	Matunga	66.12%	Kamla Raman	INC	26,037	48.57%	Narayan Dandekar	SWA	11,856	22.12%	14,181
39	Kurla	60.24%	Prabhakar Kashinath Kunte	INC	51,220	58.82%	Leeladhar Balaji Dake	SS	11,842	13.60%	39,378
40	Vandre	63.54%	Jorge D. Souza	INC	44,434	53.19%	Sadanand Shankar Varde	SSP	23,316	27.91%	21,118
41	Santacruz	59.57%	Jagesh Desai	INC	48,101	61.90%	Dandekar Shankar Laxman	SS	13,782	17.74%	34,319
42	Andheri	61.74%	Ramanath Mahavir Pandey	INC	47,710	50.47%	Raginwar Rajeswar Waman	SS	17,427	18.44%	30,283
43	Vile Parle	61.73%	Chandulal Shah Kantaben	INC	39,531	52.59%	Pranlal Harkishandas Vora	INC(O)	14,841	19.74%	24,690
44	Malad	64.77%	Mrinal Keshav Gore	SSP	43,133	41.68%	M. V. Paranjape	INC	39,998	38.65%	3,135
45	Borivali	59.14%	Dwarkanath Govind Palkar	INC	41,389	51.92%	Thakarshi Mulji Tanna	ABJS	19,270	24.17%	22,119
46	Chembur	64.40%	Vishwanath Krishna Tembe	INC	60,690	57.17%	Hashu Parasaram Advani	ABJS	24,453	23.03%	36,237
47	Ghatkopar	59.86%	R. Vishnunarayan Tripathi	INC	63,959	60.07%	Rajanikant C. Thakar	ABJS	13,953	13.10%	50,006
48	Mulund	63.15%	Dutta Samant	INC	73,206	57.28%	Ramchandra Vishnu Padwal	SS	18,542	14.51%	54,664
49	Thane	54.97%	Vimal Kaanderao Rangnekar	INC	47,730	59.54%	Wamanrao Rege Prabhakar	ABJS	14,718	18.36%	33,012
50	Kalyan	61.59%	Nakul Pundlik Patil	INC	40,048	51.34%	Ram Kapse	ABJS	20,171	25.86%	19,877
51	Ulhasnagar	53.38%	Sanmukh Chuharmal Israni	INC	26,735	42.65%	Pralhad Hiranand Advani	ABJS	20,803	33.19%	5,932
52	Murbad	59.51%	Shantaram Gopal Gholap	INC	35,791	60.61%	Namdev Kashinath Aher	PWPI	20,285	34.35%	15,506
53	Bhiwandi	60.84%	Haris Ridwan Burhan Saheb	INC	34,983	46.52%	Bhagwan P. Vyas	ABJS	16,115	21.43%	18,868
54	Bassein	68.31%	Hari Govindrao Vartak	INC	40,589	58.65%	Pandhari Nath R. Choudhari	SSP	28,617	41.35%	11,972
55	Palghar	60.36%	Vinayak Sitaram Patil	INC	32,441	63.71%	Moreshwar Bhimaji Mestri	SSP	17,285	33.95%	15,156
56	Dahanu	56.99%	Mahadeo Gopal Kadu	INC	26,378	52.69%	Kom Lahanu Shidwa	CPI(M)	23,685	47.31%	2,693
57	Kasa	48.76%	Sumada Rajaram Vithal	INC	19,453	44.28%	Sutar Dhakat Posha	CPI(M)	12,496	28.44%	6,957
58	Jawhar	44.03%	Ramchandra Gopal Bhoye	INC	17,508	50.89%	Somnath Ramawani	ABJS	11,419	33.19%	6,089
59	Shahapur	45.05%	Shrirang Rama Shinge	INC	25,983	66.50%	Yashwant Gunaji Amekar	Independent	11,028	28.22%	14,955
60	Igatpuri	44.49%	Ghare Vitthalrao Ganpat	INC	23,060	55.32%	Wagh Bhau Sakru	BKD	10,859	26.05%	12,201
61	Deolali	61.52%	Nivruttirao B. Gaidhani	Independent	18,224	42.35%	Shankarrao N. Deshmukh	INC	15,723	36.54%	2,501
62	Nashik	54.39%	Lonari Vilas Murlidhar	INC	35,894	63.03%	Kathe Ganpatrao Pundalik	ABJS	18,121	31.82%	17,773
63	Sinnar	67.75%	Ramkrishna Narayan Naik	INC	31,628	53.08%	Waje Shankarrao Balaji	Independent	25,967	43.58%	5,661
64	Niphad	65.69%	Dulaji Sitaram Patil	Independent	28,322	50.16%	Vinayakrao P. Patil	INC	27,755	49.16%	567
65	Yevla	65.68%	Nivritti Ramji Bhorkade	Independent	30,923	58.91%	Madhavrao T. Patil	INC	15,509	29.55%	15,414
66	Nandgaon	64.37%	Hirubhau Manku Gavali	INC	25,352	43.18%	Gangadhar Shivaram Aher	Independent	11,952	20.36%	13,400
67	Malegaon	69.20%	Asisha Chiragh Hakim	INC	36,848	48.40%	Nihal Ahmed Maulavi Mohammed Usman	SSP	30,729	40.37%	6,119
68	Dabhadi	57.89%	Hiray Baliram Waman	INC	28,805	54.41%	Shivaji Namdeo Patil	SSP	17,868	33.75%	10,937
69	Chandor	60.49%	Janardan Kedu Aher	Independent	25,665	47.34%	Madhukarrao S. Sonawane	INC	25,530	47.09%	135
70	Dindori	43.08%	Kacharu Bhau Raut	INC	24,340	60.20%	Ramchandra Makunda Bhoye	Independent	8,272	20.46%	16,068
71	Surgana	41.25%	Arjun Tulashiram Pawar	BKD	20,649	60.05%	Sitaram Savaji Bhoye	INC	8,201	23.85%	12,448
72	Baglan	65.48%	Mothabhau Gorakh Bhamre	INC	37,682	62.07%	Udaram Tulshiram Deore	CPI	10,127	16.68%	27,555
73	Sakri	59.86%	Gojarbai Ramrao Bhamre	INC	33,173	60.29%	Jagannath T. Desale	CPI	20,201	36.71%	12,972
74	Navapur	46.59%	Surupsingh Hirya Naik	INC	32,700	80.34%	Shrawan Rama Gaikw Ad	Independent	4,405	10.82%	28,295
75	Nandurbar	46.91%	Ramesh Panya Valvi	INC	33,705	79.78%	Madhav Bandu More	ABJS	7,145	16.91%	26,560
76	Talode	39.45%	Dilwarsing D. Padvi	ABJS	15,793	49.44%	Goraji Suraji Padvi	INC	13,956	43.69%	1,837
77	Shahada	32.41%	Chanurasing D. Bhandari	INC	15,171	63.05%	Guman Hari Patale	ABJS	8,001	33.25%	7,170
78	Shirpur	69.43%	Shivajirao Girdhar Patil	INC	37,616	65.77%	Prahladrao Madhavrao Patil	ABJS	17,251	30.16%	20,365
79	Sindkheda	57.37%	Lilabai Uttamrao Patil	INC	28,788	58.15%	Raghunath Chindha Patil	SSP	14,693	29.68%	14,095
80	Dhulia North	53.44%	Sadashiv Shankar Mali	INC	33,898	67.84%	Zulal Bhilajirao Patil	PWPI	15,623	31.26%	18,275
81	Dhulia South	60.01%	Kamalabai Chhaganlal	INC	25,919	46.83%	Chaudhari	Independent	18,959	34.25%	6,960
82	Chalisgaon	43.61%	Dinakar Diwan Chavan	INC	31,340	79.02%	Zalte Dhanaji Raghu	RPI	5,607	14.14%	25,733
83	Parola	46.24%	Patil Bhaskarrao Rajaram	INC	38,127	88.79%	Suryawanshi C. Chindha	ABJS	4,812	11.21%	33,315
84	Amalner	58.07%	Jagatrao Vyankatrao Pawar	INC	40,223	86.00%	Namdeo Maharu Patil	ABJS	5,034	10.76%	35,189
85	Chopda	61.13%	Sharadchandrika Suresh Patil	INC	42,125	79.40%	Bhimrao Sahebrao Patil	ABJS	6,382	12.03%	35,743
86	Erandol	57.44%	Digambar Shankar Patil	INC	29,248	57.63%	M. Dattatraya Dandawate	SSP	12,288	24.21%	16,960
87	Jalgaon	55.73%	Madhukar Atmaram Patil	INC	23,392	45.36%	Bhalerao Sadashiv Narayan	CPI	20,199	39.17%	3,193
88	Pachora	58.50%	Krishnarao Maharu Patil	INC	36,360	69.49%	Sharad Tryambak Patil	SSP	13,315	25.45%	23,045
89	Jamner	59.24%	Narayan Kisan Patil	Independent	26,340	51.32%	Kak Tarali K. Tafazulali	INC	24,990	48.68%	1,350
90	Bhusawal	51.06%	Prabhakar Senu Mahajan	INC	37,059	73.78%	Kanji Premji Joshi	ABJS	9,075	18.07%	27,984
91	Yawal	55.73%	Jivaram Tukaram Mahajan	INC	29,567	66.31%	Kashinatn Motiram Patil	SSP	15,022	33.69%	14,545
92	Raver	63.22%	Mahukar Dhanaji Chaudhari	INC	49,967	93.02%	Bhika Nathu Patil	ABJS	3,748	6.98%	46,219
93	Edlabad	57.91%	Pratibha Patil	INC	42,975	90.37%	Yashvant Dhana Medhe	RPI	4,582	9.63%	38,393
94	Malkapur	67.97%	Arjun Awadhut Wankhade	ABJS	29,812	48.75%	J. Rao M. Rao Jadhav	INC	28,635	46.83%	1,177
95	Buldhana	63.90%	Ramsingh Deosingh Bhonde	INC	30,540	52.55%	Murlidhar Chango Patil	Independent	20,878	35.92%	9,662
96	Chikhali	67.16%	Bharat Rajabhau Bondre	INC	32,110	50.44%	Keshaorao Jaiwantrao Bahekar	ABJS	17,492	27.47%	14,618
97	Lonar	55.29%	Jagarao Raoji Chavan	INC	25,452	46.03%	Sahebrao Bhaurao Mapari	Independent	20,406	36.90%	5,046
98	Mehkar	69.26%	Sitaram Chinkaji Lodhe	INC	30,022	49.24%	Tale Yadaorao Vithoba	Independent	26,548	43.54%	3,474
99	Khamgaon	66.07%	Gawande Manikrao Pralhadrao	INC	44,478	76.50%	Naraan Nathu Bhise	ABJS	10,296	17.71%	34,182
100	Shegaon	73.39%	Kashiram Raybhan Patil	PWPI	35,257	51.96%	Alsi Yaminibai Digamber	INC	26,602	39.20%	8,655
101	Akot	75.50%	Manohar Bhikaji Tayade	INC	34,114	52.60%	Bhimrao Bhaurao Wankhade	Independent	25,866	39.88%	8,248
102	Borgaon Manju	60.31%	Nilkanth Shridhar Sapkal	INC	42,972	77.14%	Kashinath Shamrao Tidke	RPI	6,780	12.17%	36,192
103	Akole	60.81%	Jamanlal Shriramji Geonka	INC	34,006	61.29%	Meshram Tokaram Maroti	RPI	9,013	16.24%	24,993
104	Balapur	63.79%	Govindrao S. Sarnayak	INC	36,832	69.75%	Anandrao S. Bhuskute	Independent	9,859	18.67%	26,973
105	Medshi	56.84%	Ramrao Gopalrao Zanak	INC	44,040	83.26%	Shamrao Uttamrao Vaidya	ABJS	4,346	8.22%	39,694
106	Washim	51.07%	Bhimrao Mahadeo Katke	INC	37,802	79.05%	Baliram G. Risodkar	ABJS	7,665	16.03%	30,137
107	Mangrulpir	73.45%	Gajadhar Ramsing Rathod	INC	37,135	56.03%	Bhimrao Laxmanrao Gadhave	Independent	23,453	35.39%	13,682
108	Murtizapur	62.97%	Pratibhadevi Tidke	INC	28,373	53.52%	Bapurao Babanji Tayade	RPI	9,553	18.02%	18,820
109	Daryapur	75.11%	Kokila Jagannath Patil	INC	50,010	72.21%	Gajanan Dewaji Nannaware	RPI	18,246	26.35%	31,764
110	Melghat	61.82%	Ramu Mhatang Patel	INC	34,542	66.05%	Narayan Nanu	Independent	17,756	33.95%	16,786
111	Achalpur	65.63%	Narsingrao Sheshrao Deshmukh	INC	48,971	76.06%	Kisan Bajirao Wankhade	RPI	12,266	19.05%	36,705
112	Morshi	64.27%	Mahulkar Malhar Ganpat	INC	45,850	73.86%	Atamaram R. Yawalkar	Independent	7,852	12.65%	37,998
113	Walgaon	66.84%	U. Rao B. Rao Mahalle	INC	39,457	64.35%	Gopal Gulab Waghmare	RPI	13,160	21.46%	26,297
114	Amravati	52.20%	Dattatraya Nagorao Metkar	INC	41,157	85.11%	Kolhe Satappa Shioappa	ABJS	4,505	9.32%	36,652
115	Badnera	70.58%	Purushottam K. Deshmukh	INC	41,649	62.10%	Krishn Rao B. Shrunngare	RPI	12,019	17.92%	29,630
116	Chandur	67.60%	Sharad Motirao Tasare	INC	48,403	71.54%	Ganpat Balaji Pole	ABJS	5,993	8.86%	42,410
117	Arvi	73.00%	Dhairyashilrao Vinayakrao	Independent	37,485	49.32%	B. M. Deshmukh	INC	27,772	36.54%	9,713
118	Pulgaon	66.96%	Prabha Rau	INC	40,499	65.04%	Motilal Shamlal Kapoor	AIFB	12,248	19.67%	28,251
119	Wardha	66.29%	Vasantrao J. Karlekar	INC	28,419	47.57%	R. C. Marotra Ghangare	Independent	27,531	46.09%	888
120	Hinganghat	70.81%	Keshaorao Motiram Zade	INC	33,382	45.29%	Deoraoji Zholbaji Kolhe	RPI(K)	19,092	25.90%	14,290
121	Umred	57.16%	A. L. Waghmare	INC	28,533	51.62%	Shrwan Doma Darne	Independent	18,368	33.23%	10,165
122	Kamthi	50.68%	S. Khan A. Kgan Pathan	INC	25,075	51.14%	Ramdas Vithoba Meshram	RPI(K)	9,481	19.33%	15,594
123	Nagpur North	59.58%	Daulatrao Husanji Ganvir	AIFB	22,993	33.09%	Ganpat Hiralal Bhagat	INC	21,135	30.41%	1,858
124	Nagpur East	62.35%	Narendra Deoghare	INC	26,944	40.04%	Ram Hedaoo	AIFB	22,452	33.36%	4,492
125	Nagpur Central	62.02%	Navalchandra G. Toksiya	INC	29,926	46.63%	Bhagawantrao Gaikawad	AIFB	11,238	17.51%	18,688
126	Nagpur West	64.45%	Sushila Balraj	INC	25,410	39.71%	Sumati B. Suklikar	ABJS	20,896	32.65%	4,514
127	Kalmeshwar	68.71%	Wankhede Sheshrao Krishnarao	INC	32,538	52.20%	Jambuwant Bapurao Dhote	AIFB	27,460	44.05%	5,078
128	Katol	77.69%	Shankarrao Daulatrao Gedam	INC	35,663	53.81%	Motilram Gulabraoji Pawade	Independent	27,338	41.25%	8,325
129	Savner	65.46%	Narendra Mahipati Tidke	INC	29,784	50.83%	Jambuwantrao Dhote	AIFB	25,018	42.70%	4,766
130	Ramtek	55.39%	Gunderao Fakiraji Mahajan	INC	17,424	37.26%	Pandurang Jairamji Hajare	AIFB	13,470	28.80%	3,954
131	Tumsar	67.26%	Keshaorao Pardhi	INC	27,334	43.59%	Shamrao R. Thakre	RPI	25,931	41.35%	1,403
132	Bhandara	77.81%	Govind Ramji Shende	Independent	41,511	59.31%	Tirpude N. Khantadu	INC	24,224	34.61%	17,287
133	Tirora	68.64%	Shaligram Ramratan Dixit	INC	26,851	41.32%	Chaitlal Ramji Bhagat	Independent	24,903	38.32%	1,948
134	Gondiya	56.41%	Gopalnarayan Shivavinayak Bajpayee	INC	29,290	53.18%	Bhojraj Sakharam Ramteke	CPI	12,398	22.51%	16,892
135	Goregaon	58.58%	R. Tulsiramji Harinkhede	INC	26,201	47.97%	Rajaram Ghusaji Dhamgaye	RPI	16,612	30.41%	9,589
136	Amgaon	62.98%	Swarupchand Ajmera	INC	31,000	54.83%	Laxman Rao Bisanji Mankar	ABJS	20,418	36.11%	10,582
137	Sakoli	77.71%	Martand Ramaji Kapgate	INC	34,326	50.13%	Shyamrao Pagaji Kapgate	ABJS	21,245	31.03%	13,081
138	Arjuni-Morgaon	69.09%	Paulzagade Adku Sonu	INC	30,414	46.31%	Namdeo Harbaji Diwathe	ABJS	17,018	25.92%	13,396
139	Adyar	73.41%	M. Mahadeorao Dhote	INC	21,389	32.97%	R. Zibalaji Katekhaye	AIFB	21,299	32.83%	90
140	Armori	47.70%	Baburao Narayan Madavi	INC	31,439	71.19%	Sukhdeobabu Wuyeeke	SSP	8,692	19.68%	22,747
141	Gadchiroli	60.21%	Raje Vishveshvar Rao	Independent	24,832	57.46%	Mada I. Devaji Tanu	INC	17,702	40.96%	7,130
142	Sironcha	56.05%	Alone Mukundrao Vithoba	INC	22,733	45.68%	Jamnadas Khobaragade	RPI(K)	17,664	35.50%	5,069
143	Rajura	59.68%	Vithalrao Laxmanrao Dhote	INC	27,079	51.07%	Musale Deorao Janardhan	Independent	19,735	37.22%	7,344
144	Chanda	60.32%	Eknath Salwe	INC	41,514	62.12%	M Krushnaji Kotpalliwar	Independent	15,779	23.61%	25,735
145	Saoli	74.01%	Y. Bhagirath Bajaj	INC	37,482	55.03%	Balayipant Deshkar	ABJS	16,809	24.68%	20,673
146	Bramhapuri	70.26%	Gurpude Baliram Marotrao	INC	30,963	44.39%	Morande Nilkanth Gopalrao	Independent	14,312	20.52%	16,651
147	Chimur	73.99%	Biraje G Motirambapu	INC	20,934	33.59%	Sonawane Adaku Shiwaji	Independent	20,689	33.20%	245
148	Bhadrawati	64.58%	Dadasaheb Deotale	INC	39,801	66.56%	Shrihari Baliram Jiotode	Independent	17,388	29.08%	22,413
149	Wani	67.36%	Dada Sitaram Nandekar	Independent	24,863	44.32%	Vimaltai Deorao Gohokar	INC	24,769	44.15%	94
150	Ralegaon	57.24%	Anandrao K Rao Deshmukh	INC	26,742	53.58%	Dhurve Prabhakar Bakaram	AIFB	20,131	40.34%	6,611
151	Kelapur	77.32%	Abasaheb P Deshmukh	INC	42,105	62.96%	Kongharekar B G Sing	AIFB	22,612	33.81%	19,493
152	Yavatmal	69.98%	Gharfalkar K N Ramchandra	AIFB	35,567	55.32%	G V Rao Balkrishna	INC	26,564	41.32%	9,003
153	Darwha	75.68%	Ali Hasan Jiwabhai Mamdani	INC	21,261	33.61%	Harish Rameshwar Mandhana	AIFB	17,512	27.68%	3,749
154	Digras	72.83%	Uttamrao Deorao Patil	INC	33,753	46.35%	Nanabhau Narayanrao Yembadwar	AIFB	30,269	41.56%	3,484
155	Pusad	82.67%	Vasantrao Naik	INC	50,772	68.04%	Dhote J Bapurao	AIFB	22,140	29.67%	28,632
156	Umarkhed	71.70%	Shankarrao Mane Ajaji	INC	31,589	52.49%	Raghunath Anant Deshmukh	Independent	22,175	36.85%	9,414
157	Kinwat	70.39%	Pachpute Kishanrao Champatrao	INC	31,563	46.40%	Mudholkar R Mukukda	Independent	18,580	27.31%	12,983
158	Hadgaon	50.10%	Palkar Ganpatrao Rangrao	INC	29,519	58.03%	Shinde Virendra Govindaro	CPI	16,481	32.40%	13,038
159	Nanded	50.07%	Farook Pasha Makhdum Pasha	INC	25,040	44.69%	More Eknath Kisanrao	Independent	10,642	18.99%	14,398
160	Bhokar	69.00%	Shankarrao Chavan	INC	45,803	72.41%	Atnod T. D.	RPI	13,171	20.82%	32,632
161	Biloli	51.63%	Ambekar Jairam Gangaram	INC	26,080	44.46%	P Gangadharrao Mahalappa	SSP	20,245	34.51%	5,835
162	Deglur	43.17%	Sabne Peeraji Satwaji	INC	23,318	55.51%	K R Sayajirao	SSP	7,642	18.19%	15,676
163	Kandhar	51.61%	Keshavrao Shankarrao Dhondge	PWPI	34,421	56.26%	Madhavrao V Jadhav	INC	21,866	35.74%	12,555
164	Gangakhed	28.06%	Sawant Iraimbakrao Maretirao	INC	16,750	55.84%	More Daulat Nimbaji	RPI	10,384	34.62%	6,366
165	Parbhani	54.37%	Jamkar Raosaheb Bapusaheb	INC	26,293	51.29%	Gauhane Annasaheb Ramchandrarao	PWPI	19,328	37.70%	6,965
166	Basmath	37.49%	S. Iqbal Hussain	INC	18,308	49.72%	V. Katneshwarkar	PWPI	14,211	38.60%	4,097
167	Kalamnuri	41.38%	Maske Vithlrao Champatrao Naik	CPI(M)	18,217	46.50%	Kalmkar B Rao G Rao	INC	16,176	41.29%	2,041
168	Hingoli	42.98%	Tale Ashatai Marotiappa	INC	19,706	45.29%	Ramkri Shna Patil	SSP	15,975	36.72%	3,731
169	Jintur	46.97%	Sheshrao Deshmukh	PWPI	26,306	62.09%	Anandrao Deshmukh	INC	10,559	24.92%	15,747
170	Pathri	47.55%	Sakhram Gopalrao Nakhate	INC	22,584	48.72%	Naik Babarao Sopanrao	PWPI	19,503	42.07%	3,081
171	Partur	50.34%	Barkule Haribhau Ramrao	PWPI	27,431	64.60%	Yadao Ramrao Narayanrao	INC	15,031	35.40%	12,400
172	Ambad	53.04%	Ankushrao Raosaheb Tope	INC	24,786	45.45%	Annasaheb U A Rao	Independent	23,967	43.95%	819
173	Jalna South	47.57%	R. S. Rao Raghunath	INC	22,062	45.75%	Gopichand Dukhi	Independent	9,719	20.15%	12,343
174	Jalna North	40.13%	Chavan Bajirao Sheshrao	Independent	15,081	40.29%	Gambhirrao Gadhe	INC	14,262	38.10%	819
175	Bhokardan	47.82%	B Rao Narsingrao Gawande	INC	30,817	67.54%	Pundlik Hari	ABJS	14,809	32.46%	16,008
176	Sillod	41.54%	Shivram Gangaram Mankar	INC	25,868	68.88%	Manohar Hari	SSP	4,824	12.84%	21,044
177	Kannad	50.25%	Narayan Girmaji Patil	INC	25,765	55.65%	Tila Sajan	SSP	20,536	44.35%	5,229
178	Vaijapur	45.88%	Shakuntalabai Patil	INC	33,404	86.08%	K S Misal	Independent	5,404	13.92%	28,000
179	Gangapur	49.07%	Balasaheb Ramrao Pawar	INC	28,812	68.39%	Vishwanath Bandu Bhosale	CPI	8,525	20.23%	20,287
180	Aurangabad West	58.56%	Zakaria Rafiq Balimy	INC	32,761	55.79%	Pradhan S T	RPI	12,641	21.53%	20,120
181	Aurangabad East	49.26%	V Rao Sukyabhan Jadhav	INC	20,429	44.61%	Rambhav Eknathrao Gavande	ABJS	18,685	40.80%	1,744
182	Paithan	56.23%	Kalyanrao Pandhorinath	INC	40,953	78.55%	Uttam Sonaji	RPI	5,238	10.05%	35,715
183	Georai	-	Sundarrao Solanke	INC	Elected Unopposed						
184	Majalgaon	35.82%	Sankeran Nathu Tribhuwan	INC	17,759	53.36%	Chakre Babu Sadashiv	CPI(M)	6,502	19.54%	11,257
185	Bhir	39.89%	Deshmukh S. Syed Ali	INC	19,029	42.70%	Dhepe M. Rudrappa	Independent	10,977	24.63%	8,052
186	Ashti	52.61%	Sripatrao Kadam	INC	29,044	56.52%	Ajbe Vishwanath Dagduji	Independent	16,096	31.32%	12,948
187	Chausala	46.23%	Kashirsagar Sonaji	INC	29,877	53.27%	Darade Vishwanathrao Anna	CPI	10,795	19.25%	19,082
188	Kaij	63.36%	Babu Rao Adaskar	INC	38,416	67.59%	Bapu Kaldate	SSP	18,417	32.41%	19,999
189	Renapur	56.14%	Raghunathrao Munde	INC	29,727	55.75%	Chewle Santram Sambhaji	PWPI	16,752	31.42%	12,975
190	Ahmedpur	57.45%	Deshmukh Kishanrao Nanasaheb	PWPI	28,742	50.40%	Raddy Sushilabhai Madhav	INC	27,192	47.68%	1,550
191	Udgir	45.27%	Vithalrao Khadiwale	RPI	22,058	47.49%	Ghoge Bhimrao Manikrao	INC	21,815	46.97%	243
192	Latur	63.59%	Shivraj Patil	INC	38,400	64.16%	Vasant Shankar Patil	SSP	17,874	29.87%	20,526
193	Kallam	57.70%	S. Sangram Ganpatrao	INC	30,177	53.98%	Namdeorao Patil	PWPI	22,519	40.28%	7,658
194	Paranda	61.97%	Vasudeo Anandrao Deshmukh	RPI	22,341	36.35%	Arunojirao Deshmukh	INC	19,771	32.17%	2,570
195	Osmanabad	59.50%	Survase Gautmarao Ramji	INC	34,220	63.17%	Ghogre Balwant Yadavrao	PWPI	18,436	34.03%	15,784
196	Ausa	64.59%	Keshavrao Sonawane	INC	44,153	72.80%	Dinkarrao Fatepurkar	CPI	14,216	23.44%	29,937
197	Nilanga	68.83%	Shivajirao Patil Nilangekar	INC	34,144	50.08%	Madhukarrao Ganpatrao Somwanshi	PWPI	30,058	44.08%	4,086
198	Omerga	60.93%	Bhaskarrao Chalukya	INC	34,867	64.64%	Vinaykraao Mane	PWPI	15,562	28.85%	19,305
199	Tuljapur	50.68%	Shivajirao Patil	INC	33,077	69.86%	M. A. K. Mohammed Isakhan	PWPI	12,499	26.40%	20,578
200	Akkalkot	66.72%	Mane Baburao Tulshiram	INC	41,268	69.61%	Mulla Rajebhai Dadesaheb	RPI	17,342	29.25%	23,926
201	Solapur South	67.48%	Virupakshappa Guruppa Shivdare	INC	48,294	91.22%	Fadatare Deoram Vithal	RPI	3,815	7.21%	44,479
202	Solapur City South	66.86%	Thokal Nirmala Shankar Rao	INC	26,529	56.94%	Rone Bhimrao Laxmanrao	Independent	9,245	19.84%	17,284
203	Solapur City North	70.15%	Ramkrishna Pant Bet	INC	25,364	47.58%	Madur Venkappa Ramayya	CPI	21,301	39.96%	4,063
204	North Sholapur	68.18%	Killedar Abasaheb Baburao	INC	29,978	54.90%	Mane Brahmadeo Krishnat	Independent	21,509	39.39%	8,469
205	Mangalwedha	66.98%	Marda Kisanlal Ramchandra	INC	29,372	50.99%	Shaha Ratanchand Shivlal	Independent	24,101	41.84%	5,271
206	Mohol	73.24%	Shahaji Rao Patil	INC	34,688	54.36%	Chandrakant Nimbalkar	PWPI	29,121	45.64%	5,567
207	Barshi	69.82%	Shailaja Shitole	INC	30,743	51.74%	Patil Dnyaneshwar Tatyaba	PWPI	26,926	45.32%	3,817
208	Madha	67.52%	Vithalrao Shinde	INC	29,233	47.94%	Sampatrao Maruti Patil	PWPI	16,434	26.95%	12,799
209	Pandharpur	58.57%	Audumber Kondiba Patil	INC	34,412	63.98%	Dombe Balu Shivling	Independent	14,915	27.73%	19,497
210	Sangola	73.16%	S. Bapusaheb Patil	INC	33,448	50.94%	Ganpatrao Deshmukh	PWPI	31,793	48.42%	1,655
211	Malshiras	-	Deshmukh C. Abasaheb	INC	Elected Unopposed						
212	Karmala	43.50%	T. H. Sonawane	INC	22,454	71.24%	Kamble Ramchandra Maruti	RPI(K)	7,767	24.64%	14,687
213	Karjat	51.99%	Nimbalkar Rao Saheb	INC	35,146	80.52%	Zarakar Rajaram Murlidhar	ABJS	8,502	19.48%	26,644
214	Shrigonda	47.54%	Baburao Mahadeo Bharaskar	Independent	19,853	53.86%	Shinde Prabhakar Bhaurao	INC	15,192	41.22%	4,661
215	Ahmednagar South	61.97%	Barshikar Navnitbhai Narayandas	Independent	28,406	56.57%	Ranade Kalabai Shriram	INC	13,286	26.46%	15,120
216	Ahmednagar North	52.88%	Mhaske Kisanrao Balaji	INC	31,779	65.99%	Mhaske Banshi Revji	CPI	16,380	34.01%	15,399
217	Pathardi	55.11%	Mhaske Ganapat Rajaram	Independent	31,937	55.45%	Manikbai Garje	INC	23,126	40.15%	8,811
218	Shevgaon	67.03%	Langhe Vakilrao Baburao	CPI	31,329	52.72%	Gadakh Yashwantrao Kankar	INC	28,097	47.28%	3,232
219	Shrirampur	68.99%	Govindrao Adik	INC	30,276	53.33%	Bhaskarrao Galande	Independent	22,350	39.37%	7,926
220	Shirdi	76.12%	Shankarrao Genuji Kolhe	Independent	38,745	52.51%	Rohamare Karbhari Bhimaji	INC	33,052	44.80%	5,693
221	Rahuri	58.86%	Kadu Punjaji Bapuji	CPI	28,939	53.31%	Wagh Ramanath Laxman	INC	25,064	46.17%	3,875
222	Parner	63.37%	Shankarrao Kale	INC	25,900	51.33%	Bhagat Dattatrya Kondiram	Independent	24,560	48.67%	1,340
223	Sangamner	60.58%	B. J. Khatal-Patil	INC	47,634	77.17%	Gade Mohanrao Abasaheb	Independent	10,660	17.27%	36,974
224	Nagar–Akola	54.24%	Yeshwant Rao Bhangare	INC	30,445	63.92%	Bapurao Deshmukh	CPI	11,482	24.11%	18,963
225	Junnar	59.99%	Tambeshrikishna Ramji	INC	25,542	55.76%	Phule Jagdish Sitaram	SSP	19,440	42.44%	6,102
226	Ambegaon	62.61%	Kisanrao Bankhele	Independent	38,908	75.82%	Dattatraya V. Patil	INC	12,065	23.51%	26,843
227	Khed Alandi	65.20%	Sahebrao B. Patil	INC	31,874	53.35%	Shivale Manikrao Udhavrao	Independent	27,866	46.65%	4,008
228	Maval	69.76%	Bhegade Krishnarao Dhondiaba	ABJS	27,730	49.41%	Satkar Raghunath Shankar	INC	24,094	42.93%	3,636
229	Mulshi	53.31%	Mate Namdev Ramkrishanrao	INC	38,234	79.19%	Ghule Bajirao Laxman	Independent	5,204	10.78%	33,030
230	Haveli	59.05%	Martand Dhondiba Magar	INC	63,136	83.72%	Marutrao Kale	SSP	12,280	16.28%	50,856
231	Kasba Peth	70.94%	Lilaba Merchant	INC	23,586	50.03%	Rambhau Wadke	SSP	8,987	19.06%	14,599
232	Bhavani Peth	58.07%	Tikamdas Daduram Memjade	INC	34,677	56.62%	Keshavkantji Janjot	SSP	14,125	23.06%	20,552
233	Shukrawar Peth	74.03%	Rambhau Mhalgi	ABJS	41,792	50.15%	Vasant Thorat	INC	40,195	48.23%	1,597
234	Shivajinagar	62.64%	Ravindra More	INC	34,862	56.63%	Killedar B. D.	PWPI	15,226	24.73%	19,636
235	Pune Cantonment	60.42%	Shivajirao Dhere	INC	30,661	59.02%	Ram D. Tupe	SSP	13,773	26.51%	16,888
236	Shirur	54.32%	Kokare Popatrao Haribhau	INC	21,924	54.00%	Gujar Raikumar Bhogilal	RPI	12,325	30.36%	9,599
237	Dhond	50.28%	Jagdale Ushadevi Krishrao	INC	21,465	49.83%	Takawane Rajaram Bajirao	Independent	10,028	23.28%	11,437
238	Indapur	70.88%	Shankarrao Bajirao Patil	INC	42,294	65.05%	Avate Ganapt Abaji	SSP	21,842	33.60%	20,452
239	Baramati	71.34%	Sharad Pawar	INC	49,874	75.50%	More Vijayrao Hanmantrao	SSP	12,401	18.77%	37,473
240	Purandar	64.25%	Jadhavrao Jyotiyajirao	SSP	29,586	57.00%	Dayaneshwar Raghunath Khalre	INC	21,367	41.17%	8,219
241	Bhor	61.17%	Anantrao Thopate	Independent	27,401	61.14%	Chaudhari Usha Shamkant	INC	15,425	34.42%	11,976
242	Phaltan	58.73%	Krishnachandra Bhoite	INC	36,827	72.90%	Jagtap Bajirao Appaji	CPI	7,144	14.14%	29,683
243	Man	40.06%	Prabhawati G Shinde	INC	30,271	71.86%	Bhosale Bapurao Shiwaram	Independent	5,528	13.12%	24,743
244	Khatav	76.85%	Keshavarao S. Patil	Independent	38,342	56.94%	Chandrahar Patil	INC	28,543	42.39%	9,799
245	Koregaon	71.23%	Dattajirao B. Barge	Independent	39,225	67.00%	Phalke Vasantrao Jyotirao	INC	19,322	33.00%	19,903
246	Satara	68.79%	Jagtap Dhondiram Shidoji	INC	41,307	69.17%	Pawar Narayanrao Rajaram	INC(O)	13,068	21.88%	28,239
247	Wai	65.64%	Prataprao Baburao Bhosale	INC	42,125	86.73%	Pore Arvind Balkrishna	ABJS	2,840	5.85%	39,285
248	Jaoli	64.01%	Lalsingrao Bapuso Shinde	INC	31,504	62.55%	Bhilare Maruti Rayaji	Independent	17,111	33.97%	14,393
249	Patan	77.38%	Balasaheb Desai	INC	66,857	98.42%	Raosaheb S. Patankar	PWPI	1,071	1.58%	65,786
250	Karad North	72.02%	Kotwal Baburao Ramchandra	INC	53,094	77.50%	D. M. Patil	CPI	7,899	11.53%	45,195
251	Karad South	70.50%	Yashwantrao Mohite	INC	34,397	53.43%	Shankarrao P. Mohite	PWPI	29,980	46.57%	4,417
252	Shirala	67.88%	Bhagawanrao Patil	INC	44,567	68.42%	Patil Yeshwant Chandroji	PWPI	17,228	26.45%	27,339
253	Walva	79.80%	Rajarambapu Patil	INC	65,607	88.20%	Shinde Vasant Shankar	PWPI	5,963	8.02%	59,644
254	Khanapur	69.83%	Sampatrao Sitaram Mane	INC	38,361	59.45%	Pawar Sampatrao Govindrao	PWPI	26,170	40.55%	12,191
255	Tasgaon	72.47%	Babasaheb Gopalrao Patil	INC	52,725	70.87%	Jaysingrao Madhavrao Mane Deshmukh	PWPI	17,524	23.56%	35,201
256	Sangli	66.69%	Pandurang Bapu Patil	INC	55,176	82.36%	Pawar Pandit Shivaji	ABJS	6,272	9.36%	48,904
257	Miraj	75.10%	Narsinha R. Pathak	Independent	40,388	55.21%	Dadsaheb R. Jamadar	INC	32,451	44.36%	7,937
258	Kavathe Mahankal	54.98%	Annasaheb Udhav Engare	INC	51,891	87.75%	Haribhau Nana Khujat	SSP	5,704	9.65%	46,187
259	Jat	42.44%	Shivrudra T. Bamane	INC	39,096	88.52%	Kamble Anna Krashna	RPI	3,240	7.34%	35,856
260	Shirol	80.67%	Ratnappa Kumbhar	INC	61,330	75.10%	Jadhav S. Rao Ganpatrao	SSP	18,412	22.55%	42,918
261	Hatkanangale	73.91%	B. Bhausaheb Kahanjire	INC	46,967	62.25%	Patil Shivgonda Pirgonda	CPI(M)	18,227	24.16%	28,740
262	Vadgaon	50.20%	Vhatkar Namdeo Laxman	INC	38,694	80.70%	Kurne Dattajirao Bhaurao	Independent	2,498	5.21%	36,196
263	Shahuwadi	74.90%	Udaysingrao Gaikwad	INC	49,368	82.08%	Kumbhar Shankar Babu	PWPI	10,776	17.92%	38,592
264	Panhala	66.70%	D. Yashwantrao Patil	INC	36,951	66.21%	Patil Sadashiv Daulatrao	PWPI	12,242	21.93%	24,709
265	Radhanagari	75.05%	Krishnaji Gangaram More	Independent	25,195	35.98%	Baku Abai D. Khandekar	INC	16,891	24.12%	8,304
266	Kolhapur	73.12%	Karkhanis T. Rao Sitaram	PWPI	38,943	54.33%	Popatrao B. Jaganale	INC	30,018	41.88%	8,925
267	Karvir	75.49%	Shripatrao S. Bondre	INC	54,424	74.43%	Hindurao K. Salokhe	PWPI	18,698	25.57%	35,726
268	Kagal	74.59%	Sadashivrao Dadoba Mandlik	Independent	34,608	49.10%	Nikam Daulatrao Appaji	INC	32,984	46.80%	1,624
269	Gadhinglaj	78.23%	Patil Baburao Satgauda	INC	30,994	46.28%	Batkadli Nagapa Gurlingapa	Independent	24,121	36.02%	6,873
270	Chandgad	77.25%	Desai Vasantrao Abasaheb	INC	24,730	39.30%	Chavan Patil V. K.	Independent	18,966	30.14%	5,764

=== Results by region ===
Region	Total seats	Indian National Congress	Peasants and Workers Party of India	Bharatiya Jana Sangh
Western Maharashtra	70	70	-	-
Vidarbha	62	60	1	1
Marathwada	46	31	3	3
Thane+Konkan	39	37	1	-
Mumbai	36	14	-	-
North Maharashtra	35	14	2	1
Total	288	222	7	5
