= Jalna North Assembly constituency =

Constituency of the Maharashtra legislative assembly in India

Jalna North
- Former constituency for the Maharashtra Legislative Assembly

Constituency details
- Country: India
- Region: Western India
- State: Maharashtra
- Established: 1967
- Abolished: 1978
- Total electors: 88,026

Jalna North Assembly constituency was an assembly constituency in the India state of Maharashtra.

== Members of the Legislative Assembly ==
Election	Member	Party
1967	Gambhirrao Gadhe	Indian National Congress
1972	Chavan Bajirao Sheshrao	Independent politician

== Election results ==
=== Assembly Election 1972 ===
1972 Maharashtra Legislative Assembly election : Jalna North
Party	Candidate	Votes	%	±%
Independent	Chavan Bajirao Sheshrao	15,081	40.29%	New
INC	Gambhirrao Gadhe	14,262	38.10%	▼9.87
RPI	Pandit Babulal Rajaram	4,509	12.05%	New
Independent	Dhengale Sampatrao Paraji	859	2.29%	New
PWPI	Raut Rambhau Deorao	611	1.63%	New
Margin of victory		819	2.19%	▼19.87
Turnout		37,432	40.13%	▼1.32
Registered electors		88,026		▲12.70
Independent gain from INC		Swing	▼7.68	

=== Assembly Election 1967 ===
1967 Maharashtra Legislative Assembly election : Jalna North
Party	Candidate	Votes	%	±%
INC	Gambhirrao Gadhe	16,425	47.97%	New
CPI	G. D. Chitnis	8,871	25.91%	New
Independent	K. S. Mohite	5,519	16.12%	New
Independent	S. P. Dhengle	445	1.30%	New
Margin of victory		7,554	22.06%	
Turnout		34,241	40.02%	
Registered electors		78,106		
INC win (new seat)				
