= Dhond Assembly constituency =

Constituency of the Maharashtra legislative assembly in India

Dhond
- Former constituency for the Maharashtra Legislative Assembly

Constituency details
- Country: India
- Region: Western India
- State: Maharashtra
- Established: 1962
- Abolished: 1978
- Total electors: 83,036

Dhond Assembly constituency was an assembly constituency in the India state of Maharashtra.

== Members of the Legislative Assembly ==
Election	Member	Party
1962	Vithal Ramchandra Pawar	Indian National Congress
1967	P. J. Tatyaba	Indian National Congress
1972	Jagdale Ushadevi Krishrao	Indian National Congress

== Election results ==
=== Assembly Election 1972 ===
1972 Maharashtra Legislative Assembly election : Dhond
Party	Candidate	Votes	%	±%
INC	Jagdale Ushadevi Krishrao	21,465	49.83%	▲7.85
Independent	Takawane Rajaram Bajirao	10,028	23.28%	New
Independent	Divekar Eknath Sitaram	5,709	13.25%	New
RPI	Bhalerao Anant Krishnaji	1,999	4.64%	▼2.59
RPI(K)	Ramchandra G. Khandale	1,232	2.86%	New
PWPI	Kale Nivrutti Dagadoba	966	2.24%	New
Independent	Pansare Laxman Gopal	353	0.82%	New
Margin of victory		11,437	26.55%	▼6.23
Turnout		43,076	50.28%	▲4.77
Registered electors		83,036		▲16.47
INC hold		Swing	▲7.85	

=== Assembly Election 1967 ===
1967 Maharashtra Legislative Assembly election : Dhond
Party	Candidate	Votes	%	±%
INC	P. J. Tatyaba	14,099	41.98%	▼14.83
Independent	R. B. Takawane	3,090	9.20%	New
Independent	S. P. Shankar	2,882	8.58%	New
Independent	P. N. Tatiyaba	2,681	7.98%	New
RPI	K. R. Genuji	2,427	7.23%	▼7.89
Independent	J. A. Jotiyajirao	2,378	7.08%	New
SSP	R. G. Khandale	2,213	6.59%	New
Margin of victory		11,009	32.78%	▼8.92
Turnout		33,582	42.85%	▲12.71
Registered electors		71,293		▲8.13
INC hold		Swing	▼14.83	

=== Assembly Election 1962 ===
1962 Maharashtra Legislative Assembly election : Dhond
Party	Candidate	Votes	%	±%
INC	Vithal Ramchandra Pawar	12,884	56.82%	New
RPI	Maruti Bandu Sawant	3,428	15.12%	New
Independent	Santram Krishna Bhalerao	2,059	9.08%	New
Independent	Keshav Dadgu Shelar	932	4.11%	New
Independent	Sambhaji Bandu Londhe	773	3.41%	New
Independent	Dnyanadeo Tukaram Sonawane	515	2.27%	New
Independent	Krishna Dadu Kharat	258	1.14%	New
Margin of victory		9,456	41.70%	
Turnout		22,676	31.98%	
Registered electors		65,935		
INC win (new seat)				
