= Mangalwedha Assembly constituency =

Constituency of the Maharashtra legislative assembly in India

Mangalwedha
- Former constituency for the Maharashtra Legislative Assembly

Constituency details
- Country: India
- Region: Western India
- State: Maharashtra
- Established: 1962
- Abolished: 2008
- Total electors: 201,283

Mangalwedha Assembly constituency or Mangalvedhe was an assembly constituency in the Indian state of Maharashtra.

== Members of the Legislative Assembly ==
Election	Member	Party
1962	Ganpat Laxman Sonwane	Indian National Congress
1967	Kisanlal Ramchandra Marda	Indian National Congress
1972	Kisanlal Ramchandra Marda	Indian National Congress
1978	Nivrutti Satwaji Kamble	Republican Party of India
1980	Vimaltai Dnyandeo Borade	Indian National Congress (I)
1985	Laxman Kondiba Dhobale	Indian Congress (Socialist)
1990	Laxman Kondiba Dhobale	Indian National Congress
1995	Laxman Kondiba Dhobale	Indian National Congress
1999	Laxman Kondiba Dhobale	Nationalist Congress Party
2004	Ramchandra Dnyanoba Sale	Nationalist Congress Party

== Election results ==
=== Assembly Election 2004 ===
2004 Maharashtra Legislative Assembly election : Mangalwedha
Party	Candidate	Votes	%	±%
NCP	Sale Ramchandra Dnyanoba	47,251	40.04%	▼1.81
SS	Gopal Sambhu Shivsharan	32,303	27.37%	New
JSS	Avinash Anantrao Shinde	16,864	14.29%	New
Independent	Bendre Ambadas Dharma	12,894	10.92%	New
Independent	Vijay Janardan Shiktode	2,623	2.22%	New
BSP	Appa Aba Lokare	1,780	1.51%	New
Independent	Mane Ashok Narsu	1,170	0.99%	New
Margin of victory		14,948	12.67%	▲8.04
Turnout		118,023	58.63%	▼5.24
Registered electors		201,283		▲23.10
NCP hold		Swing	▼1.81	

=== Assembly Election 1999 ===
1999 Maharashtra Legislative Assembly election : Mangalwedha
Party	Candidate	Votes	%	±%
NCP	Dhobale Laxman Kondiba	43,704	41.84%	New
INC	Shinde Avinash Anant	38,875	37.22%	▼14.40
Independent	Shikatode Vijay Janardan	14,587	13.97%	New
Margin of victory		4,829	4.62%	▼14.98
Turnout		104,449	60.03%	▼11.23
Registered electors		163,513		▲3.77
NCP gain from INC		Swing	▼9.77	

=== Assembly Election 1995 ===
1995 Maharashtra Legislative Assembly election : Mangalwedha
Party	Candidate	Votes	%	±%
INC	Dhobale Laxman Kondiba	61,087	51.62%	▼1.83
Independent	Borade Vimaltai Dnyandeo	37,892	32.02%	New
SS	Bansode Shamrao Rakhamaji	12,573	10.62%	▼29.58
JD	Hiremath (Swami) Chanbasayya Mupayya	1,343	1.13%	▲0.46
Independent	Kshirsagar Nagnath Dattatraya (Kalal)	834	0.70%	New
RPI	Shivsharan Namdeo Sidram	716	0.61%	New
Margin of victory		23,195	19.60%	▲6.35
Turnout		118,346	73.36%	▲11.70
Registered electors		157,565		▲7.66
INC hold		Swing	▼1.83	

=== Assembly Election 1990 ===
1990 Maharashtra Legislative Assembly election : Mangalwedha
Party	Candidate	Votes	%	±%
INC	Dhobale Laxman Kondiba	49,605	53.45%	▲15.30
SS	Ramesh Dhondapa Shinde	37,307	40.20%	New
BRP	Kamaraj Tukaram Bhandare	1,895	2.04%	New
JD	Kadam Vishnu Sadashiv	627	0.68%	New
Margin of victory		12,298	13.25%	▼7.65
Turnout		92,805	62.22%	▼0.01
Registered electors		146,354		▲24.71
INC gain from IC(S)		Swing	▼5.59	

=== Assembly Election 1985 ===
1985 Maharashtra Legislative Assembly election : Mangalwedha
Party	Candidate	Votes	%	±%
IC(S)	Dhobale Laxman Kondiba	43,944	59.04%	New
INC	Aute Sushila Laxman	28,390	38.15%	New
Independent	Ughade Bhagwan Ginyane	624	0.84%	New
Margin of victory		15,554	20.90%	▼0.49
Turnout		74,425	62.41%	▲14.22
Registered electors		117,358		▲11.38
IC(S) gain from INC(I)		Swing	▲6.13	

=== Assembly Election 1980 ===
1980 Maharashtra Legislative Assembly election : Mangalwedha
Party	Candidate	Votes	%	±%
INC(I)	Borade Vimaltai Dnyandeo	27,427	52.91%	▲34.94
RPI	Kambale Bajirao Dasharath	16,338	31.52%	▲2.69
BJP	Swami Mrugendra Chanaiyya	4,807	9.27%	New
Independent	Dange Rambhajirao Alias Annasaheb Amabaji	573	1.11%	New
Independent	Mane Dhondiram Totoba	528	1.02%	New
RPI(K)	Kshirasagar Pandurag Revapa	504	0.97%	▼18.38
Margin of victory		11,089	21.39%	▲13.00
Turnout		51,834	47.86%	▲3.91
Registered electors		105,366		▲11.12
INC(I) gain from RPI		Swing	▲24.08	

=== Assembly Election 1978 ===
1978 Maharashtra Legislative Assembly election : Mangalwedha
Party	Candidate	Votes	%	±%
RPI	Kamble Nivrutti Satwaji	12,379	28.83%	New
Independent	Dange Rambhajirao Alias Annasaheb Amabaji	8,774	20.43%	New
RPI(K)	Kshirasagar Pandurag Revapa	8,311	19.36%	New
INC(I)	Borade Vimaltai Dnyandeo	7,719	17.98%	New
Independent	Khadatare Bhanudas Narayan	1,885	4.39%	New
Independent	More Pandurang Tamanna	887	2.07%	New
Independent	Eknath Gulab Lokhande	522	1.22%	New
Margin of victory		3,605	8.40%	▼0.75
Turnout		42,937	44.12%	▼23.86
Registered electors		94,825		▲13.81
RPI gain from INC		Swing	▼22.15	

=== Assembly Election 1972 ===
1972 Maharashtra Legislative Assembly election : Mangalwedha
Party	Candidate	Votes	%	±%
INC	Marda Kisanlal Ramchandra	29,372	50.99%	▼0.10
Independent	Shaha Ratanchand Shivlal	24,101	41.84%	New
Independent	Abute Laxman Narsu	2,330	4.04%	New
Margin of victory		5,271	9.15%	▲2.74
Turnout		57,609	66.98%	▲0.54
Registered electors		83,318		▲11.42
INC hold		Swing		

=== Assembly Election 1967 ===
1967 Maharashtra Legislative Assembly election : Mangalwedha
Party	Candidate	Votes	%	±%
INC	K. R. Marda	26,208	51.09%	▼15.00
Independent	R. S. Shah	22,921	44.68%	New
Margin of victory		3,287	6.41%	▼46.88
Turnout		51,302	65.70%	▲36.15
Registered electors		74,780		▲14.39
INC hold		Swing		

=== Assembly Election 1962 ===
1962 Maharashtra Legislative Assembly election : Mangalwedha
Party	Candidate	Votes	%	±%
INC	Ganpat Laxman Sonwane	14,023	66.09%	New
RPI	Govind Pandurang Magade	2,716	12.80%	New
Independent	Babu Dhula Sale	2,459	11.59%	New
Independent	Vishwanath Mahadev Kashirasagar	741	3.49%	New
Margin of victory		11,307	53.29%	
Turnout		21,219	30.50%	
Registered electors		65,374		
INC win (new seat)				
