= Walgaon Assembly constituency =

Constituency of the Maharashtra legislative assembly in India

Walgaon
- Former constituency for the Maharashtra Legislative Assembly

Constituency details
- Country: India
- Region: Western India
- State: Maharashtra
- Established: 1952
- Abolished: 2008
- Total electors: 162,376

Walgaon Assembly constituency was an assembly constituency in the India state of Maharashtra.

== Members of the Legislative Assembly ==
| Election | Member | Party |
|---|---|---|
| 1952 | Purshottam Kashirao Deshmukh | Indian National Congress |
| 1967 | Uttamrao Babarao Mahalle | Indian National Congress |
| 1972 | Uttamrao Babarao Mahalle | Indian National Congress |
| 1978 | Ambadas Bapurao Sable | Indian National Congress (I) |
| 1980 | Ambadas Bapurao Sable | Indian National Congress (I) |
| 1985 | Anil Gopalrao Warhade | Indian National Congress |
| 1990 | Anil Gopalrao Warhade | Indian National Congress |
| 1995 | Sanjay Raosaheb Band | Shiv Sena |
| 1999 | Sanjay Raosaheb Band | Shiv Sena |
| 2004 | Sanjay Raosaheb Band | Shiv Sena |

== Election results ==
=== Assembly Election 2004 ===
2004 Maharashtra Legislative Assembly election : Walgaon
| Party | Candidate | Votes | % | ±% |
|---|---|---|---|---|
| SS | Band Sanjay Raosaheb | 41,109 | 37.53% | ▼9.51 |
| INC | Warhade Sunil Gopalrao | 28,346 | 25.88% | New |
| BSP | Kuralkar Chandrashekhar Ramdaspant | 21,545 | 19.67% | ▲18.78 |
| Independent | Rajendra Pralhadrao Alies Baba Juwar | 3,532 | 3.22% | New |
| Bahujan Mahasangha Paksha | Dr. Bhande Dashratha Motiran | 3,095 | 2.83% | New |
| Independent | Milind Shriranji Tayde | 2,635 | 2.41% | New |
| BBM | Abhyankar Madhukar Sukhadeo | 2,076 | 1.90% | New |
| Independent | Shivaji Bapurao Dongare | 1,711 | 1.56% | New |
| Margin of victory | | 12,763 | 11.65% | ▼10.54 |
| Turnout | | 109,542 | 67.46% | ▲7.67 |
| Total valid votes | | 109,536 | | |
| Registered electors | | 162,376 | | ▲4.50 |
| SS hold | | Swing | ▼9.51 | |

=== Assembly Election 1999 ===
1999 Maharashtra Legislative Assembly election : Walgaon
| Party | Candidate | Votes | % | ±% |
|---|---|---|---|---|
| SS | Band Sanjay Raosaheb | 40,690 | 47.04% | ▲23.91 |
| RPI | D. Z. Wakpanjar | 21,491 | 24.84% | ▲17.18 |
| Independent | Dr. Anil Gopalrao Warhade | 12,713 | 14.70% | New |
| SP | Amirkhan Hamidkhan Pathan | 7,775 | 8.99% | New |
| Independent | Anil Balkrishna Gondane | 1,294 | 1.50% | New |
| BSP | Manikkaka Raibole | 767 | 0.89% | New |
| Independent | Vijay Gulabrao Gohatre | 722 | 0.83% | New |
| Margin of victory | | 19,199 | 22.19% | ▲18.81 |
| Turnout | | 92,904 | 59.79% | ▼16.60 |
| Total valid votes | | 86,504 | | |
| Registered electors | | 155,379 | | ▲4.30 |
| SS hold | | Swing | ▲23.91 | |

=== Assembly Election 1995 ===
1995 Maharashtra Legislative Assembly election : Walgaon
| Party | Candidate | Votes | % | ±% |
|---|---|---|---|---|
| SS | Sanjay Raosaheb Band | 25,864 | 23.13% | ▼0.40 |
| INC | Dr. Anil Warhade | 22,089 | 19.76% | ▼5.72 |
| Independent | Amirkhan Hamidkhan | 14,243 | 12.74% | New |
| Independent | Shrikant Vishwas Taral | 12,986 | 11.62% | New |
| BBM | Edatkar Dilip Laxmanrao | 8,572 | 7.67% | New |
| RPI | Wakpanjar. D. Z | 8,568 | 7.66% | ▼14.81 |
| Independent | Mahalle Nilima Shrikant | 3,714 | 3.32% | New |
| Samajwadi Janata Party (Maharashtra) | Belsare Baburao Deorao | 3,326 | 2.97% | New |
| Margin of victory | | 3,775 | 3.38% | ▲1.42 |
| Turnout | | 113,802 | 76.39% | ▲14.06 |
| Total valid votes | | 111,800 | | |
| Registered electors | | 148,978 | | ▲11.04 |
| SS gain from INC | | Swing | ▼2.35 | |

=== Assembly Election 1990 ===
1990 Maharashtra Legislative Assembly election : Walgaon
| Party | Candidate | Votes | % | ±% |
|---|---|---|---|---|
| INC | Anil Warhade | 20,983 | 25.48% | ▼21.62 |
| SS | Subhash Alias Nanubhau Mahalle | 19,373 | 23.53% | New |
| RPI | D. Z. Wakpanjar | 18,504 | 22.47% | ▲20.68 |
| JD | Shrikant Vishwas Taral | 9,815 | 11.92% | New |
| Independent | Babarao Bagorao Patil | 3,916 | 4.76% | New |
| Independent | Kashirao Bapu Zagade | 1,802 | 2.19% | New |
| INS(SCS) | Ingole Gangadharrao Barikrao | 1,592 | 1.93% | New |
| Lokdal (B) | Shekh Mahammad Shekh Bashir Chabiwala | 1,020 | 1.24% | New |
| Margin of victory | | 1,610 | 1.96% | ▼17.50 |
| Turnout | | 83,623 | 62.33% | ▲5.68 |
| Total valid votes | | 82,349 | | |
| Registered electors | | 134,172 | | ▲25.55 |
| INC hold | | Swing | ▼21.62 | |

=== Assembly Election 1985 ===
1985 Maharashtra Legislative Assembly election : Walgaon
| Party | Candidate | Votes | % | ±% |
|---|---|---|---|---|
| INC | Varhade Anil Gopalrao | 28,080 | 47.10% | New |
| IC(S) | Deshmukh Nilkanth Madahavrao | 16,479 | 27.64% | New |
| Independent | Pralhad Bajirao Gaikwad | 11,941 | 20.03% | New |
| Independent | A. Jamil Sk. Mohammed | 1,703 | 2.86% | New |
| RPI | Gawai Uttam Jangluji | 1,068 | 1.79% | New |
| Margin of victory | | 11,601 | 19.46% | ▲7.97 |
| Turnout | | 60,537 | 56.65% | ▲3.54 |
| Total valid votes | | 59,613 | | |
| Registered electors | | 106,866 | | ▲4.39 |
| INC gain from INC(I) | | Swing | ▲1.48 | |

=== Assembly Election 1980 ===
1980 Maharashtra Legislative Assembly election : Walgaon
| Party | Candidate | Votes | % | ±% |
|---|---|---|---|---|
| INC(I) | Ambadas Bapurao Bhau Sable | 24,363 | 45.62% | ▼20.49 |
| INC(U) | Deshmukh Nilkanth Madhao | 18,225 | 34.13% | New |
| RPI(K) | Gaikwad Prahlad Bajirao | 9,664 | 18.10% | New |
| Independent | Dr. Chavan Anirudha Udhaorao | 1,147 | 2.15% | New |
| Margin of victory | | 6,138 | 11.49% | ▼39.81 |
| Turnout | | 54,370 | 53.11% | ▼20.32 |
| Total valid votes | | 53,399 | | |
| Registered electors | | 102,372 | | ▲5.90 |
| INC(I) hold | | Swing | ▼20.49 | |

=== Assembly Election 1978 ===
1978 Maharashtra Legislative Assembly election : Walgaon
| Party | Candidate | Votes | % | ±% |
|---|---|---|---|---|
| INC(I) | Sable Bhau Bapurao | 45,789 | 66.11% | New |
| INC | Ingole Bhagwant Maroti | 10,259 | 14.81% | ▼49.54 |
| Independent | Wankhede Vishwas Ruprao | 6,704 | 9.68% | New |
| Independent | Patil Ganeshrao Uttamrao | 2,127 | 3.07% | New |
| Independent | Khandare Sudam Tulshiram | 1,980 | 2.86% | New |
| Independent | Jamnekar Pandurang Bajirao | 1,006 | 1.45% | New |
| Independent | Zagde Kashinath Shrawanji | 735 | 1.06% | New |
| Independent | Deshmukh Dharmavair Vishwasrao | 565 | 0.82% | New |
| Margin of victory | | 35,530 | 51.30% | ▲8.41 |
| Turnout | | 70,978 | 73.43% | ▲6.59 |
| Total valid votes | | 69,259 | | |
| Registered electors | | 96,664 | | ▲2.81 |
| INC(I) gain from INC | | Swing | ▲1.76 | |

=== Assembly Election 1972 ===
1972 Maharashtra Legislative Assembly election : Walgaon
| Party | Candidate | Votes | % | ±% |
|---|---|---|---|---|
| INC | U. Rao B. Rao Mahalle | 39,457 | 64.35% | ▲16.19 |
| RPI | Gopal Gulab Waghmare | 13,160 | 21.46% | New |
| AIFB | Ambadas B. Sable | 5,257 | 8.57% | New |
| PWPI | Namdeo Dattatraya Mohod | 2,702 | 4.41% | ▼40.91 |
| Independent | Pundlik Chihuji Ogale | 373 | 0.61% | New |
| Margin of victory | | 26,297 | 42.89% | ▲40.05 |
| Turnout | | 62,846 | 66.84% | ▼5.89 |
| Total valid votes | | 61,312 | | |
| Registered electors | | 94,023 | | ▲11.04 |
| INC hold | | Swing | ▲16.19 | |

=== Assembly Election 1967 ===
1967 Maharashtra Legislative Assembly election : Walgaon
| Party | Candidate | Votes | % | ±% |
|---|---|---|---|---|
| INC | U. Rao B. Rao Mahalle | 26,761 | 48.16% | ▲1.17 |
| PWPI | B. V. Bonde | 25,185 | 45.32% | New |
| Independent | S. S. Khande | 2,733 | 4.92% | New |
| ABJS | S. R. Umekar | 888 | 1.60% | New |
| Margin of victory | | 1,576 | 2.84% | ▼14.05 |
| Turnout | | 61,589 | 72.73% | ▲10.00 |
| Total valid votes | | 55,567 | | |
| Registered electors | | 84,676 | | ▲101.90 |
| INC hold | | Swing | ▲1.17 | |

=== Assembly Election 1952 ===
1952 Hyderabad State Legislative Assembly election : Walgaon
| Party | Candidate | Votes | % | ±% |
|---|---|---|---|---|
| INC | Purshottam Kashirao Deshmukh | 12,362 | 46.99% | New |
| KMPP | Gulabrao Champatrao Bobde | 7,918 | 30.10% | New |
| SCF | Champatrao Hanumant Ramteke | 4,897 | 18.61% | New |
| Socialist | Madhaorao Wamanrao Deshmukh | 1,130 | 4.30% | New |
| Margin of victory | | 4,444 | 16.89% | |
| Turnout | | 26,307 | 62.73% | |
| Total valid votes | | 26,307 | | |
| Registered electors | | 41,940 | | |
| INC win (new seat) | | | | |
