= Bhadrawati Assembly constituency =

Constituency of the Maharashtra legislative assembly in India

Bhadrawati
- Former constituency for the Maharashtra Legislative Assembly

Constituency details
- Country: India
- Region: Western India
- State: Maharashtra
- Established: 1957
- Abolished: 2008
- Total electors: 216,650

Bhadrawati Assembly constituency

Bhadrawati Assembly constituency was an assembly constituency in the India state of Maharashtra.

== Members of the Legislative Assembly ==
Election	Member	Party
1957	Mathankar Narayan Harbaji	Indian National Congress
1962	Dadasaheb alias Ramchandra Janardhan Deotale	Indian National Congress
1967	Dadasaheb alias Ramchandra Janardhan Deotale	Indian National Congress
1972	Dadasaheb alias Ramchandra Janardhan Deotale	Indian National Congress
1978	Nilkanthrao Yeshwantrao Shinde	Indian National Congress (I)
1980	Dadasaheb alias Ramchandra Janardhan Deotale	Indian National Congress (I)
1985	Moreshwar Vithalrao Temurde	Independent politician
1990	Moreshwar Vithalrao Temurde	Janata Dal
1995	Sanjay Wamanrao Deotale	Indian National Congress
1999	Sanjay Wamanrao Deotale	Indian National Congress
2004	Sanjay Wamanrao Deotale	Indian National Congress

== Election results ==
=== Assembly Election 2004 ===
2004 Maharashtra Legislative Assembly election : Bhadrawati
Party	Candidate	Votes	%	±%
INC	Sanjay Wamanrao Deotale	48,422	34.10%	▼4.44
Independent	Dr. Anil Laxmanrao Bujone	29,979	21.11%	New
SS	Kishor Rambhau Dange	13,697	9.65%	▼23.19
Independent	Moreshwar Vithalrao Temurde	12,483	8.79%	New
BSP	Sharad Shamrao Jiwatode	10,950	7.71%	New
Independent	Sanjay Shrihari Jiwatode	9,424	6.64%	New
Independent	Janardhan @ Balasaheb Shrirang Salunkhe (Guruji)	4,126	2.91%	New
Margin of victory		18,443	12.99%	▲7.29
Turnout		142,008	65.54%	▼2.00
Registered electors		216,650		▲14.65
INC hold		Swing	▼4.44	

=== Assembly Election 1999 ===
1999 Maharashtra Legislative Assembly election : Bhadrawati
Party	Candidate	Votes	%	±%
INC	Sanjay Wamanrao Deotale	49,191	38.54%	▲14.27
SS	Dr. Anil Laxmanrao Bujone	41,918	32.84%	▲21.67
NCP	Babasaheb Sonbaji Wasade	26,056	20.41%	New
GGP	Sharad Dasharath Madavi	2,980	2.33%	New
Margin of victory		7,273	5.70%	▼1.72
Turnout		127,652	64.78%	▼15.19
Registered electors		188,972		▲0.66
INC hold		Swing	▲14.27	

=== Assembly Election 1995 ===
1995 Maharashtra Legislative Assembly election : Bhadrawati
Party	Candidate	Votes	%	±%
INC	Sanjay Wamanrao Deotale	37,689	24.26%	▼3.04
Independent	Babasaheb Sonbaji Wasade	26,164	16.84%	New
Independent	Moreshwar Vithalrao Temurde	25,808	16.61%	New
SS	Janardhan @ Balasaheb Shrirang Salunkhe	17,344	11.16%	New
Independent	Rajio Nathuji Dodake	14,588	9.39%	New
BSP	Chandrashekhar Deotale	13,399	8.63%	New
Independent	Kirtikumar Madanlal Sancheti	3,252	2.09%	New
Margin of victory		11,525	7.42%	▲3.68
Turnout		155,345	81.02%	▲14.22
Registered electors		187,741		▲15.18
INC gain from JD		Swing	▼6.78	

=== Assembly Election 1990 ===
1990 Maharashtra Legislative Assembly election : Bhadrawati
Party	Candidate	Votes	%	±%
JD	Temurde Moreshwar Vithalrao	34,666	31.04%	New
INC	Wasade Babasaheb Sonbaji	30,495	27.30%	▼4.23
Independent	Nannaware Adaku Kawadu	11,218	10.04%	New
RPI(K)	Ramateke Maroti Bhiwa	10,841	9.71%	New
Independent	Ekare Bhaurao Nagorao	9,518	8.52%	New
Independent	Shinde Nilakantharao Yashwantrao	6,860	6.14%	New
Independent	Deotale Chandrashekhar Digambarrao	2,408	2.16%	New
Margin of victory		4,171	3.73%	▼8.17
Turnout		111,688	67.28%	▲5.68
Registered electors		163,000		▲23.31
JD gain from Independent		Swing	▼12.40	

=== Assembly Election 1985 ===
1985 Maharashtra Legislative Assembly election : Bhadrawati
Party	Candidate	Votes	%	±%
Independent	Moreshwar Vithalrao Temurde	36,088	43.44%	New
INC	Ramchandra Janardhan Deotale alias Dadasaheb Deotale	26,197	31.54%	New
Independent	Mohammad Shabbir Mohammad Yakub Sheikh	8,335	10.03%	New
BJP	Narayan Alias Bhayyaji Shrihari Deshpande	2,476	2.98%	New
IC(S)	Nilkanthrao Yashwantrao Shinde	2,416	2.91%	New
Independent	Vithal Tulshiram Burchande	2,203	2.65%	New
Independent	Fulchand Dharmaji Gulagunde	1,883	2.27%	New
Margin of victory		9,891	11.91%	▲8.02
Turnout		83,072	61.73%	▲3.36
Registered electors		132,190		▲6.26
Independent gain from INC(I)		Swing	▲0.19	

=== Assembly Election 1980 ===
1980 Maharashtra Legislative Assembly election : Bhadrawati
Party	Candidate	Votes	%	±%
INC(I)	Ramchandra Janardhan Deotale alias Dadasaheb Deotale	32,004	43.25%	▼10.04
Independent	Adkoo Patil Nannaware	29,129	39.37%	New
INC(U)	Shinde Nilkanthrao Yeshwantrao	3,988	5.39%	New
Independent	Vesambare Baburao Govindrao	2,742	3.71%	New
RPI	Dange Ramchandra Samba	1,811	2.45%	New
JP	Aswale Gopalkrushna Domaji	1,614	2.18%	▼24.79
Independent	M. A. Rauf	502	0.68%	New
Margin of victory		2,875	3.89%	▼22.43
Turnout		73,995	58.02%	▼14.89
Registered electors		124,405		▲8.42
INC(I) hold		Swing	▼10.04	

=== Assembly Election 1978 ===
1978 Maharashtra Legislative Assembly election : Bhadrawati
Party	Candidate	Votes	%	±%
INC(I)	Nilkanthrao Yeshwantrao Shinde	45,475	53.29%	New
JP	Moreshwar Vithalrao Termurde	23,016	26.97%	New
INC	Ramchandra Janardhan Deotale alias Dadasaheb Deotale	9,628	11.28%	▼55.28
Independent	Dhoot Shrivas Bansilal	1,852	2.17%	New
Independent	Burchande Vithalrao Tulshiram	1,464	1.72%	New
Independent	Deotale Vithalrao Laxmanrao	1,130	1.32%	New
Margin of victory		22,459	26.32%	▼11.16
Turnout		85,333	72.28%	▲7.80
Registered electors		114,739		▲27.73
INC(I) gain from INC		Swing	▼13.27	

=== Assembly Election 1972 ===
1972 Maharashtra Legislative Assembly election : Bhadrawati
Party	Candidate	Votes	%	±%
INC	Ramchandra Janardhan Deotale alias Dadasaheb Deotale	39,801	66.56%	▲22.10
Independent	Shrihari Baliram Jiotode	17,388	29.08%	New
Independent	Nilkanthrao Shinde	817	1.37%	New
Margin of victory		22,413	37.48%	▲34.55
Turnout		59,795	64.58%	▼4.51
Registered electors		89,827		▲12.49
INC hold		Swing		

=== Assembly Election 1967 ===
1967 Maharashtra Legislative Assembly election : Bhadrawati
Party	Candidate	Votes	%	±%
INC	Ramchandra Janardhan Deotale alias Dadasaheb Deotale	25,232	44.46%	▼0.78
SSP	Vithal Rao Laxman Rao Deotale	23,570	41.53%	New
Independent	S. N. Ramteke	1,218	2.15%	New
Independent	N. V. Nagdeote	1,081	1.90%	New
ABJS	M. V. Hazare	998	1.76%	▼1.35
Independent	B. S. Kamade	479	0.84%	New
Margin of victory		1,662	2.93%	▼0.43
Turnout		56,752	65.85%	▼1.02
Registered electors		79,851		▲6.69
INC hold		Swing	▼0.78	

=== Assembly Election 1962 ===
1962 Maharashtra Legislative Assembly election : Bhadrawati
Party	Candidate	Votes	%	±%
INC	Ramchandra Janardhan Deotale alias Dadasaheb Deotale	24,414	45.24%	New
PSP	Vithal Rao Laxman Rao Deotale	22,604	41.89%	New
ABJS	Manohar Deorao Patil	1,678	3.11%	New
Independent	Bhagwan Udhao Patil	1,294	2.40%	New
Independent	Vithal Krishnaji Salwatkar	914	1.69%	New
Margin of victory		1,810	3.35%	
Turnout		53,960	68.01%	
Registered electors		74,845		
INC win (new seat)				
