= Vadgaon Assembly constituency =

Constituency of the Maharashtra legislative assembly in India

Vadgaon
- Former constituency for the Maharashtra Legislative Assembly

Constituency details
- Country: India
- Region: Western India
- State: Maharashtra
- Established: 1967
- Abolished: 2008
- Total electors: 218,553

Vadgaon Assembly constituency was an assembly constituency in the India state of Maharashtra.

== Members of the Legislative Assembly ==
Election	Member	Party
1967	K. N. Ghatage	Indian National Congress
1972	Vhatkar Namdeo Laxman	Indian National Congress
1978	Mane Nanasaheb Shantaram	Janata Party
1980	Avale Jayawant Gangaram	Indian National Congress
1985	Avale Jayawant Gangaram	Indian National Congress
1990	Avale Jayawant Gangaram	Indian National Congress
1995	Avale Jayawant Gangaram	Indian National Congress
1999	Avale Jayawant Gangaram	Indian National Congress
2004	Awale Raju Kisan	Jan Surajya Shakti

== Election results ==
=== Assembly Election 2004 ===
2004 Maharashtra Legislative Assembly election : Vadgaon
Party	Candidate	Votes	%	±%
JSS	Awale Raju Kisan	67,489	42.99%	New
INC	Avale Jayawant Gangaram	56,356	35.90%	▲0.52
SS	Bhaskar Mahadeo Shete	14,966	9.53%	▼14.43
Independent	Dr. Puntambekar Shirish Ramkrishna	2,052	1.31%	New
BSP	Jaywant Ramji Sawardekar	1,235	0.79%	New
Independent	Gaikwad Shamrao Dattu	1,151	0.73%	New
Margin of victory		11,133	7.09%	▼0.27
Turnout		156,994	71.43%	▲1.58
Registered electors		218,553		▲15.72
JSS gain from INC		Swing	▲7.61	

=== Assembly Election 1999 ===
1999 Maharashtra Legislative Assembly election : Vadgaon
Party	Candidate	Votes	%	±%
INC	Avale Jayawant Gangaram	46,938	35.38%	▲4.09
NCP	Shete Bhaskar Mahadeo	37,166	28.01%	New
SS	Akaram Shivaram Dabade (Bapu)	31,789	23.96%	▼5.13
Independent	Madhukar Kamble (Ghunakikar)	8,959	6.75%	New
Margin of victory		9,772	7.36%	▲5.17
Turnout		132,686	66.53%	▼4.90
Registered electors		188,870		▲1.03
INC hold		Swing	▲4.09	

=== Assembly Election 1995 ===
1995 Maharashtra Legislative Assembly election : Vadgaon
Party	Candidate	Votes	%	±%
INC	Avale Jayawant Gangaram	43,951	31.28%	▼25.64
SS	Dabade Akaram Shivram	40,866	29.09%	▲6.37
Independent	Awale Kisan Sakharam	32,005	22.78%	New
JD	Mane Nanasaheb Shantaram	5,776	4.11%	▼2.51
BSP	Deshmukh Babasaheb Thalajirao	2,665	1.90%	New
Independent	Khabade Dasharath Aba	2,664	1.90%	New
Independent	Kamble Sukumar Dattu	1,455	1.04%	New
Margin of victory		3,085	2.20%	▼32.01
Turnout		140,495	73.38%	▲20.00
Registered electors		186,941		▲16.34
INC hold		Swing	▼25.64	

=== Assembly Election 1990 ===
1990 Maharashtra Legislative Assembly election : Vadgaon
Party	Candidate	Votes	%	±%
INC	Avale Jayawant Gangaram	50,445	56.92%	▼2.02
SS	Akaram Shivaram Dabade (Mistri)	20,131	22.72%	New
INS(SCS)	Nanasaheb Shantaram Mane	6,558	7.40%	New
JD	Sukumar Dattu Kamble	5,869	6.62%	New
BRP	Jalandar Dinkar Jamadar	3,185	3.59%	New
Independent	Machhindranath Hari Kamble (M. H. )	766	0.86%	New
Margin of victory		30,314	34.21%	▲2.07
Turnout		88,621	54.24%	▲2.82
Registered electors		160,687		▲24.87
INC hold		Swing	▼2.02	

=== Assembly Election 1985 ===
1985 Maharashtra Legislative Assembly election : Vadgaon
Party	Candidate	Votes	%	±%
INC	Avale Jayawant Gangaram	39,697	58.95%	New
IC(S)	Mane Nanasaheb Shantaram	18,054	26.81%	New
Independent	Solankar Mangla Prabhakar	5,226	7.76%	New
Independent	Kamble Atmaram Ananda	1,469	2.18%	New
RPI	Thikpurle Bandopant Dhondiram	723	1.07%	▼4.21
Margin of victory		21,643	32.14%	▼19.46
Turnout		67,345	51.37%	▲11.73
Registered electors		128,687		▲11.53
INC gain from INC(I)		Swing	▼4.60	

=== Assembly Election 1980 ===
1980 Maharashtra Legislative Assembly election : Vadgaon
Party	Candidate	Votes	%	±%
INC(I)	Avale Jayawant Gangaram	29,771	63.55%	New
Independent	Mane Nanasaheb Shantaram	5,596	11.94%	New
BJP	Shringare Ramchandra Nana	3,075	6.56%	New
Independent	Samudre Jagannath Sitaram	2,664	5.69%	New
RPI	Kamble Ratan Balu	2,477	5.29%	New
JP	Kamble Mahadeo Bhau	1,470	3.14%	▼34.90
Independent	Devekar Ravaji Trimbyak	482	1.03%	New
Margin of victory		24,175	51.60%	▲49.14
Turnout		46,850	39.47%	▼23.01
Registered electors		115,380		▲8.06
INC(I) gain from JP		Swing	▲25.51	

=== Assembly Election 1978 ===
1978 Maharashtra Legislative Assembly election : Vadgaon
Party	Candidate	Votes	%	±%
JP	Mane Nanasaheb Shantaram	25,835	38.04%	New
Independent	Samudre Jagannath Sitaram	24,167	35.58%	New
Independent	Powar Ganpatrao Ramchandra	9,140	13.46%	New
PWPI	Sonavane Ramkrishna Santu	3,990	5.87%	New
Independent	Chinchawadkar Mahadeo Dhondiram	1,937	2.85%	New
Independent	Raje Shankar Tukaram	926	1.36%	New
Independent	Kamble Appan Krishna	529	0.78%	New
Margin of victory		1,668	2.46%	▼73.03
Turnout		67,918	62.31%	▲11.62
Registered electors		106,771		▲15.77
JP gain from INC		Swing	▼42.66	

=== Assembly Election 1972 ===
1972 Maharashtra Legislative Assembly election : Vadgaon
Party	Candidate	Votes	%	±%
INC	Vhatkar Namdeo Laxman	38,694	80.70%	▲41.41
Independent	Kurne Dattajirao Bhaurao	2,498	5.21%	New
RPI	Bhujingrao L. Kamble	2,246	4.68%	▼28.16
RPI(K)	Thikpurle Bandopant Dhondiram	1,883	3.93%	New
Independent	Name Hindurao Chandrappa	978	2.04%	New
Margin of victory		36,196	75.49%	▲69.04
Turnout		47,948	50.20%	▼16.58
Registered electors		92,223		▲19.20
INC hold		Swing	▲41.41	

=== Assembly Election 1967 ===
1967 Maharashtra Legislative Assembly election : Vadgaon
Party	Candidate	Votes	%	±%
INC	K. N. Ghatage	20,845	39.29%	New
RPI	D. M. Shirke	17,424	32.84%	New
Independent	R. B. Kamable	4,834	9.11%	New
Independent	R. D. Kamble	3,272	6.82%	New
Independent	L. G. Patole	734	1.53%	New
Independent	H. C. Mane	591	1.23%	New
Margin of victory		3,421	6.45%	
Turnout		53,053	61.65%	
Registered electors		77,370		
INC win (new seat)				
