= Adyar Assembly constituency =

Constituency of the Maharashtra legislative assembly in India

Adyar
- Former constituency for the Maharashtra Legislative Assembly

Constituency details
- Country: India
- Region: Western India
- State: Maharashtra
- Established: 1962
- Abolished: 2008
- Total electors: 174,045

Adyar Assembly constituency was an assembly constituency in the India state of Maharashtra.

== Members of the Legislative Assembly ==
Election	Member	Party
1962	Aba Dhondu Gosawi	Republican Party of India
1967	M. N. Waldewar	Republican Party of India
1972	M. Mahadeorao Dhote	Indian National Congress
1978	Vitthalrao Sakharamji Tighare	Indian National Congress
1980	Ramkrishana Zibalji Katekhaye	Indian National Congress
1985	Vilas Vishwanath Shrungarpawar	Indian National Congress
1990	Vilas Vishwanath Shrungarpawar	Independent politician
1995	Bandubhau alias Bhuishchandra Harishchandra Patil Sawarbandhe	Independent politician
1999	Bandubhau alias Bhuishchandra Harishchandra Patil Sawarbandhe	Indian National Congress
2004	Bandubhau alias Bhuishchandra Harishchandra Patil Sawarbandhe	Indian National Congress

== Election results ==
=== Assembly Election 2004 ===
2004 Maharashtra Legislative Assembly election : Adyar
Party	Candidate	Votes	%	±%
INC	Sawarbandhe Bhuishchandra Alies Bandubhau Harishchandra	43,627	33.11%	▼16.53
SS	Dahare Naresh Keshaorao	37,860	28.73%	▲13.19
BSP	Dongare Rajesh Kisan	20,595	15.63%	▲12.96
Independent	Vilas Ramkrishna Katekhaye	13,196	10.01%	New
Peoples Republican Party	Devendra Wasudeo Hajare	7,551	5.73%	New
Independent	Satyabhama Wasudeo Wasnik	3,067	2.33%	New
Independent	Rewatkar Rajendrabhau Ramchandra	1,686	1.28%	New
Margin of victory		5,767	4.38%	▼29.72
Turnout		1,31,802	75.73%	▲4.81
Total valid votes		1,31,769		
Registered electors		1,74,045		▲11.65
INC hold		Swing	▼16.53	

=== Assembly Election 1999 ===
1999 Maharashtra Legislative Assembly election : Adyar
Party	Candidate	Votes	%	±%
INC	Sawarbandhe Bhuishchandra Alies Bandubhau Harishchandra	54,870	49.64%	New
SS	Sheshrao Pisaram Girhepunje	17,182	15.55%	▼5.88
NCP	Panchebudhe Nana Jayaram	15,957	14.44%	New
Independent	Katekhaye Vilas Ramkrushna	9,707	8.78%	New
Independent	Pachare Prakash Hiraman	6,861	6.21%	New
BSP	Gajbhiye Rajvilas Ratiram	2,956	2.67%	▼11.96
Independent	Ajabale Satyavan Namdeo	745	0.67%	New
Margin of victory		37,688	34.10%	▲23.29
Turnout		1,17,710	75.51%	▼12.70
Total valid votes		1,10,528		
Registered electors		1,55,890		▲0.88
INC gain from Independent		Swing	▲17.41	

=== Assembly Election 1995 ===
1995 Maharashtra Legislative Assembly election : Adyar
Party	Candidate	Votes	%	±%
Independent	Sawarbandhe Bhuishchandra Alies Bandubhau Harishchandra	41,644	32.23%	New
SS	Revatkar Rajendra Ramchandra	27,675	21.42%	▲2.36
BSP	Rajvilas Rtiram Gajbheye	18,900	14.63%	New
JD	Ekanath Ramchandra Bawankar	12,456	9.64%	▼3.14
RPI(K)	Ramtake Parmanand Sitaram	6,756	5.23%	New
Independent	Shivarkar Laxman Sakharam	4,081	3.16%	New
Independent	Bansod Dharamdas Mokas	3,283	2.54%	New
Margin of victory		13,969	10.81%	▲3.39
Turnout		1,32,216	85.56%	▲13.04
Total valid votes		1,29,189		
Registered electors		1,54,529		▲6.87
Independent hold		Swing	▲4.70	

=== Assembly Election 1990 ===
1990 Maharashtra Legislative Assembly election : Adyar
Party	Candidate	Votes	%	±%
Independent	Shrungapawar Vilas Vishwanath	28,091	27.53%	New
RPI	Ramteke Charandas Marotrao	20,521	20.11%	▼5.02
SS	Katekhaye Vilas Ramkrushna	19,453	19.07%	New
JD	Ekanath Ramchandra Bawankar	13,043	12.78%	New
Independent	Kewat Mahadeo Maniram	4,257	4.17%	New
Independent	Warkade Narhari Govinda	2,592	2.54%	New
Independent	Tirpude Laxmanrao Shrawan	2,236	2.19%	New
Margin of victory		7,570	7.42%	▼9.00
Turnout		1,03,136	71.33%	▼0.21
Total valid votes		1,02,035		
Registered electors		1,44,594		▲23.42
Independent gain from INC		Swing	▼14.02	

=== Assembly Election 1985 ===
1985 Maharashtra Legislative Assembly election : Adyar
Party	Candidate	Votes	%	±%
INC	Shrungapawar Vilas Vishwanath	34,455	41.55%	New
RPI	Ramteke Harishchandra Sadashiorao	20,836	25.13%	New
IC(S)	Bandebuche Pandurang Atmaram	12,338	14.88%	New
Independent	Tighare Vitthalrao Sakharamji	8,692	10.48%	New
Independent	Kewat Mahadeo Maniram	2,173	2.62%	New
Independent	Wanjari Anandrao Chaitu	1,216	1.47%	New
Independent	Karwade Dhanraj Dudha	705	0.85%	New
Margin of victory		13,619	16.42%	▼2.42
Turnout		84,293	71.95%	▲6.91
Total valid votes		82,922		
Registered electors		1,17,155		▲5.10
INC gain from INC(U)		Swing	▼2.66	

=== Assembly Election 1980 ===
1980 Maharashtra Legislative Assembly election : Adyar
Party	Candidate	Votes	%	±%
INC(U)	Katekhaye Ramkrishana Zibalji	31,481	44.21%	New
INC(I)	Wanjari Anandrao Tukaram	18,065	25.37%	▼13.82
RPI(K)	Ramteke Charandas Marotrao	18,061	25.37%	▲0.38
Independent	Pipare Raghunath Chintaman	1,746	2.45%	New
BJP	Girshettiwar Rajeshwar Haribhau	1,337	1.88%	New
Margin of victory		13,416	18.84%	▲4.71
Turnout		72,561	65.09%	▼9.03
Total valid votes		71,200		
Registered electors		1,11,473		▲6.20
INC(U) gain from INC(I)		Swing	▲5.02	

=== Assembly Election 1978 ===
1978 Maharashtra Legislative Assembly election : Adyar
Party	Candidate	Votes	%	±%
INC(I)	Tighare Vitthalrao Sakharamji	29,993	39.20%	New
Independent	Katekhaye Ramkrishana Zibalji	19,177	25.06%	New
RPI(K)	Damle Rajaram Bhivaji	19,121	24.99%	New
Independent	Motghare Tukaram Urkuda	5,276	6.89%	New
Independent	Tirpude Ramesh Danuji	1,200	1.57%	New
Independent	Meshram Ramchandra Gujaram	1,028	1.34%	New
RPI	Ramteke Sadanand Mangalrao	726	0.95%	▼2.90
Margin of victory		10,816	14.13%	▲14.00
Turnout		79,472	75.71%	▲1.61
Total valid votes		76,521		
Registered electors		1,04,968		▲15.34
INC(I) gain from INC		Swing	▲6.23	

=== Assembly Election 1972 ===
1972 Maharashtra Legislative Assembly election : Adyar
Party	Candidate	Votes	%	±%
INC	M. Mahadeorao Dhote	21,389	32.97%	▲9.20
AIFB	R. Zibalaji Katekhaye	21,299	32.83%	New
Independent	Moreshwar Waladekar	11,249	17.34%	New
Independent	Raghunath Hari Bramhankar	5,550	8.55%	New
RPI	Gasavi Abaji Dhondu	2,494	3.84%	▼22.46
Independent	Madhukar Gajabhiye	869	1.34%	New
Independent	Nilakanth Handkuji Manape	784	1.21%	New
Margin of victory		90	0.14%	▼0.14
Turnout		66,811	73.41%	▲5.93
Total valid votes		64,880		
Registered electors		91,006		▲9.84
INC gain from RPI		Swing	▲6.66	

=== Assembly Election 1967 ===
1967 Maharashtra Legislative Assembly election : Adyar
Party	Candidate	Votes	%	±%
RPI	M. N. Waldewar	14,247	26.31%	▼14.24
Independent	R. Zibalaji Katekhaye	14,098	26.03%	New
INC	G. S. Rambol	12,870	23.76%	▼16.25
Independent	R. H. Brambaukar	7,684	14.19%	New
ABJS	N. S. Sawarbande	2,451	4.53%	New
Independent	D. M. Rahate	1,693	3.13%	New
Independent	M. D. Kulwante	1,114	2.06%	New
Margin of victory		149	0.28%	▼0.26
Turnout		60,105	72.54%	▲9.04
Total valid votes		54,157		
Registered electors		82,855		▲19.82
RPI hold		Swing	▼14.24	

=== Assembly Election 1962 ===
1962 Maharashtra Legislative Assembly election : Adyar
Party	Candidate	Votes	%	±%
RPI	Aba Dhondu Gosawi	15,791	40.54%	New
INC	Prabhavatibai Kashinath Gajabhiye	15,583	40.01%	New
Independent	Dinkar Modku Rahate	5,285	13.57%	New
Independent	Ratiram Antoo Maldhari	1,640	4.21%	New
Independent	Motiram Ganu Ramteke	648	1.66%	New
Margin of victory		208	0.53%	
Turnout		42,746	61.82%	
Total valid votes		38,947		
Registered electors		69,149		
RPI win (new seat)				
