= Borgaon Manju Assembly constituency =

Constituency of the Maharashtra legislative assembly in India

Borgaon Manju
- Former constituency for the Maharashtra Legislative Assembly

Constituency details
- Country: India
- Region: Western India
- State: Maharashtra
- Established: 1962
- Abolished: 2008
- Total electors: 275,854

Borgaon Manju Assembly constituency was an assembly constituency in the Indian state of Maharashtra.

== Members of the Legislative Assembly ==
Election	Member	Party
1962	Dagad Zangoji Palaspagar	Indian National Congress
1967	Nilkanth Shridhar Sapkal	Indian National Congress
1972	Nilkanth Shridhar Sapkal	Indian National Congress
1978	Manikrao Ramchandra Apotikar	Indian National Congress (I)
1980	Arun Vishnu Divekar	Indian National Congress (I)
1985	Vasantrao Ramrao Dhotre	Indian National Congress
1990	Gajanan Deorao Dalu (Guruji)	Shiv Sena
1995	Gulabrao Ramrao Gawande	Shiv Sena
1999	Dr. Dashrath Motiram Bhande	Bharipa Bahujan Mahasangh
2004	Haridas Pandhari Bhade	Bharipa Bahujan Mahasangh

== Election results ==
=== Assembly Election 2004 ===
2004 Maharashtra Legislative Assembly election : Borgaon Manju
Party	Candidate	Votes	%	±%
BBM	Bhade Haridas Pandhari	44,140	26.93%	▼13.40
Independent	Malokar Vijay Onkarrao	39,341	24.00%	New
SS	Shrirang Bhagawanrao Pinjarkar	30,845	18.82%	▼12.56
INC	Deshmukh Udayrao Tryambakrao	23,921	14.59%	New
Bahujan Mahasangha Paksha	Dr. Bhande Dashrath Motiram	13,221	8.06%	New
BSP	Ingale Shankar Kisanrao	3,237	1.97%	New
Independent	Ganesh Shravanji Pote	2,017	1.23%	New
Margin of victory		4,799	2.93%	▼6.02
Turnout		1,63,937	59.43%	▲1.35
Total valid votes		1,63,933		
Registered electors		2,75,854		▲20.26
BBM hold		Swing	▼13.40	

=== Assembly Election 1999 ===
1999 Maharashtra Legislative Assembly election : Borgaon Manju
Party	Candidate	Votes	%	±%
BBM	Dr. Bhande Dashrath Motiram	51,329	40.32%	▲12.07
SS	Malokar Vijay Onkarrao	39,939	31.37%	▼2.74
NCP	Dalu Gajanan Deorao	32,582	25.60%	New
Independent	Bhirad Balmukund Pandurangji	3,447	2.71%	New
Margin of victory		11,390	8.95%	▲3.09
Turnout		1,33,208	58.07%	▼15.79
Total valid votes		1,27,297		
Registered electors		2,29,374		▲9.63
BBM gain from SS		Swing	▲6.21	

=== Assembly Election 1995 ===
1995 Maharashtra Legislative Assembly election : Borgaon Manju
Party	Candidate	Votes	%	±%
SS	Gulabrao Ramrao Gawande	52,716	34.11%	▼3.76
BBM	Bhande Dashrath Motiram	43,661	28.25%	New
INC	Gajanan Deorao Dalu (Guruji)	39,630	25.64%	▲6.80
Independent	Shardul Sampatrao Nimgare	3,361	2.17%	New
Independent	Manoj Devidas Taide	2,670	1.73%	New
PWPI	Deshmukh Pradip Manikrao	1,860	1.20%	New
Independent	Apotikar Manikrao Ramchandra	1,317	0.85%	New
Margin of victory		9,055	5.86%	▼8.77
Turnout		1,57,277	75.17%	▲6.49
Total valid votes		1,54,545		
Registered electors		2,09,227		▲20.92
SS hold		Swing	▼3.76	

=== Assembly Election 1990 ===
1990 Maharashtra Legislative Assembly election : Borgaon Manju
Party	Candidate	Votes	%	±%
SS	Dalu Gajanan Deorao	44,153	37.87%	New
BRP	Gawai Ramesh Ramrao	27,098	23.24%	New
INC	Patil Anantkumar Kisanrao	21,962	18.84%	▼31.44
Independent	Dhotre Vasantrao Ramrao	17,287	14.83%	New
Independent	Ghawat Dashrath Motiram	3,751	3.22%	New
Margin of victory		17,055	14.63%	▼11.18
Turnout		1,17,938	68.16%	▲4.85
Total valid votes		1,16,580		
Registered electors		1,73,034		▲29.22
SS gain from INC		Swing	▼12.41	

=== Assembly Election 1985 ===
1985 Maharashtra Legislative Assembly election : Borgaon Manju
Party	Candidate	Votes	%	±%
INC	Dhotre Vasantrao Ramrao	42,094	50.28%	New
Independent	Ingale Shrawan Shekoji	20,486	24.47%	New
Independent	Adhe Dhanraj Yeshwant	13,817	16.50%	New
PWPI	Hiware Haribhau Ramchandra	4,922	5.88%	New
Independent	Vinayakrao Parashram Telgote	668	0.80%	New
Independent	Holkar Mahadeo Mukaji	613	0.73%	New
Independent	Mumtajahemadkhan Pirmohmadkhan	604	0.72%	New
Margin of victory		21,608	25.81%	▲16.23
Turnout		84,805	63.33%	▲0.36
Total valid votes		83,719		
Registered electors		1,33,902		▲15.52
INC gain from INC(I)		Swing	▲6.61	

=== Assembly Election 1980 ===
1980 Maharashtra Legislative Assembly election : Borgaon Manju
Party	Candidate	Votes	%	±%
INC(I)	Divekar Arun Vishnu	31,461	43.67%	▼17.45
Independent	Bhuibhar Mahadeorao Gulabrao	24,558	34.09%	New
RPI	Deshmukh Vasantrao Wamanrao	12,742	17.69%	New
BJP	Tayade Anil Keshaorao	1,507	2.09%	New
Independent	Shrawan Shekoji Ingle	722	1.00%	New
Independent	Shegokar Ramchandra Arjun	474	0.66%	New
Margin of victory		6,903	9.58%	▼24.45
Turnout		73,850	63.71%	▼7.21
Total valid votes		72,048		
Registered electors		1,15,909		▲9.23
INC(I) hold		Swing	▼17.45	

=== Assembly Election 1978 ===
1978 Maharashtra Legislative Assembly election : Borgaon Manju
Party	Candidate	Votes	%	±%
INC(I)	Apotikar Manikrao Ramchandra	44,990	61.12%	New
PWPI	Patil Trimbak Pandhari	19,938	27.08%	▲20.19
INC	Sarnayak Govindrao Sheshrao	4,271	5.80%	▼71.34
Independent	Tayade Shaligram Deoman	1,694	2.30%	New
Independent	Ratanlal Panduranglal Sahgal	841	1.14%	New
Independent	Patil Ganeshrao Uttamrao	728	0.99%	New
Independent	Rahate Dyandeo Zangoji	613	0.83%	New
Margin of victory		25,052	34.03%	▼30.94
Turnout		75,852	71.48%	▲15.04
Total valid votes		73,615		
Registered electors		1,06,117		▲3.49
INC(I) gain from INC		Swing	▼16.02	

=== Assembly Election 1972 ===
1972 Maharashtra Legislative Assembly election : Borgaon Manju
Party	Candidate	Votes	%	±%
INC	Nilkanth Shridhar Sapkal	42,972	77.14%	▲13.37
RPI	Kashinath Shamrao Tidke	6,780	12.17%	New
PWPI	Ramchandra Bahakar	3,838	6.89%	▼21.00
AIFB	Anandrao Deshmukh	1,652	2.97%	New
Independent	S. Guruji Laxman Abhiman	466	0.84%	New
Margin of victory		36,192	64.97%	▲29.08
Turnout		61,841	60.31%	▼9.85
Total valid votes		55,708		
Registered electors		1,02,536		▲13.77
INC hold		Swing	▲13.37	

=== Assembly Election 1967 ===
1967 Maharashtra Legislative Assembly election : Borgaon Manju
Party	Candidate	Votes	%	±%
INC	Nilkanth Shridhar Sapkal	36,885	63.77%	▲5.51
PWPI	T. P. Patil	16,129	27.89%	New
Independent	N. R. Dhage	2,030	3.51%	New
Independent	B. N. Sirsath	1,426	2.47%	New
Independent	D. Januji	853	1.47%	New
Independent	L. A. Sardar	518	0.90%	New
Margin of victory		20,756	35.88%	▲5.59
Turnout		64,026	71.04%	▲10.09
Total valid votes		57,841		
Registered electors		90,122		▲6.03
INC hold		Swing	▲5.51	

=== Assembly Election 1962 ===
1962 Maharashtra Legislative Assembly election : Borgaon Manju
Party	Candidate	Votes	%	±%
INC	Dagad Zangoji Palaspagar	26,786	58.26%	New
RPI	Shriram Daulat Gawai	12,857	27.97%	New
Independent	Baliram Shekoji Dhawale	4,578	9.96%	New
Independent	Khushal Bhikaji Mankikar	1,754	3.82%	New
Margin of victory		13,929	30.30%	
Turnout		50,974	59.97%	
Total valid votes		45,975		
Registered electors		84,995		
INC win (new seat)				
