= Gadhinglaj Assembly constituency =

Constituency of the Maharashtra legislative assembly in India

Gadhinglaj
- Former constituency for the Maharashtra Legislative Assembly

Constituency details
- Country: India
- Region: Western India
- State: Maharashtra
- Established: 1952
- Abolished: 2008
- Total electors: 177,008

Gadhinglaj Assembly constituency was an assembly constituency in the India state of Maharashtra.

== Members of the Legislative Assembly ==
Election	Member	Party
1952	Mahadeo Dundappa Shreshti	Indian National Congress
1957	Dnyandeo Santram Narwekar	Peasants and Workers Party of India
1962	Pandurang Alias Appasaheb Ramrao Nalawade	Indian National Congress
1967	T. K. Kolekar	Peasants and Workers Party of India
1972	Baburao Satgauda Patil	Indian National Congress
1978	Shivaling Shivayogi Ghali	Indian National Congress (I)
1980	Shivaling Shivayogi Ghali	Indian National Congress (I)
1985	Shripatrao Dinkarrao Shinde	Janata Party
1990	Shripatrao Dinkarrao Shinde	Janata Dal
1995	Krishnarao Rakhamajirao Desai alias Babasaheb Kupekar	Indian National Congress
1999	Krishnarao Rakhamajirao Desai alias Babasaheb Kupekar	Nationalist Congress Party
2004	Krishnarao Rakhamajirao Desai alias Babasaheb Kupekar	Nationalist Congress Party

== Election results ==
=== Assembly Election 2004 ===
2004 Maharashtra Legislative Assembly election : Gadhinglaj
Party	Candidate	Votes	%	±%
NCP	Desai Krishnarao Rakhamajirao	74,503	55.39%	▲7.17
JSS	Chavan Prakash Bhimrao	27,216	20.23%	New
SS	Shivaji Shrishailappa Hidadugi	3,526	2.62%	▼18.08
BSP	Prop. Ramchandra Baburao Kambale	2,390	1.78%	New
Margin of victory		47,287	35.15%	▲17.40
Turnout		134,514	75.99%	▲0.17
Total valid votes		134,511		
Registered electors		177,008		▲14.24
NCP hold		Swing	▲7.17	

=== Assembly Election 1999 ===
1999 Maharashtra Legislative Assembly election : Gadhinglaj
Party	Candidate	Votes	%	±%
NCP	Desai Krishnarao Rakhamajirao	54,645	48.22%	New
INC	Hattarki Rajkumar Shankarrao	34,532	30.47%	▼12.09
SS	Shahapurkar Prakash Shripad	23,457	20.70%	▲19.40
CPI(M)	Patil Shivgonda Malgonda	702	0.62%	New
Margin of victory		20,113	17.75%	▲8.91
Turnout		117,480	75.82%	▼8.37
Total valid votes		113,336		
Registered electors		154,940		▼0.57
NCP gain from INC		Swing	▲5.66	

=== Assembly Election 1995 ===
1995 Maharashtra Legislative Assembly election : Gadhinglaj
Party	Candidate	Votes	%	±%
INC	Desai Krishnarao Rakhamajirao	54,761	42.56%	▼1.24
JD	Shinde Shripatrao Dinkarrao	43,384	33.72%	▼10.73
Independent	Hattarki Rajkumar Shankarrao	27,576	21.43%	New
SS	Hidadugi Shivaji Shrishailappa	1,673	1.30%	▼7.30
Independent	Desai Sujata Shamrao	952	0.74%	New
Margin of victory		11,377	8.84%	▲8.19
Turnout		131,205	84.19%	▲9.82
Total valid votes		128,653		
Registered electors		155,836		▲10.27
INC gain from JD		Swing	▼1.89	

=== Assembly Election 1990 ===
1990 Maharashtra Legislative Assembly election : Gadhinglaj
Party	Candidate	Votes	%	±%
JD	Shinde Shripatrao Dinkarrao	45,901	44.45%	New
INC	Krishnarao Rakhamajirao Desai Alias Babasaheb Kupekar	45,227	43.80%	▲4.31
SS	Desai Bhagyeshrao Rakhamajirao Alias Bhayyasaheb Kupekar	8,883	8.60%	New
Independent	Banne Virthal Siddappa	2,085	2.02%	New
Independent	Shirur Bhimappa Gursidda	736	0.71%	New
Margin of victory		674	0.65%	▼18.39
Turnout		105,099	74.37%	▼4.20
Total valid votes		103,267		
Registered electors		141,326		▲21.77
JD gain from JP		Swing	▼14.08	

=== Assembly Election 1985 ===
1985 Maharashtra Legislative Assembly election : Gadhinglaj
Party	Candidate	Votes	%	±%
JP	Shinde Shripatrao Dinkarrao	52,285	58.53%	New
INC	Ghali Shivaling Shivayogi	35,277	39.49%	New
Independent	Mali Ishwarrao Parshuram	1,306	1.46%	New
Margin of victory		17,008	19.04%	▲10.54
Turnout		91,186	78.57%	▲6.72
Total valid votes		89,323		
Registered electors		116,057		▲10.26
JP gain from INC(I)		Swing	▲16.02	

=== Assembly Election 1980 ===
1980 Maharashtra Legislative Assembly election : Gadhinglaj
Party	Candidate	Votes	%	±%
INC(I)	Ghali Shivaling Shivayogi	31,395	42.51%	▲10.44
JP	Shinde Shripatrao Dinkarrao	25,114	34.00%	New
INC(U)	Desai Krishnarao Rakhamajirao	17,345	23.49%	New
Margin of victory		6,281	8.50%	▲7.18
Turnout		75,622	71.85%	▼8.84
Total valid votes		73,854		
Registered electors		105,253		▲4.69
INC(I) hold		Swing	▲10.44	

=== Assembly Election 1978 ===
1978 Maharashtra Legislative Assembly election : Gadhinglaj
Party	Candidate	Votes	%	±%
INC(I)	Ghali Shivaling Shivayogi	25,432	32.07%	New
INC	Batkadli Nagapa Gurlingapa	24,389	30.76%	▼15.52
JP	Shinde Shripatrao Dinkarrao	23,302	29.39%	New
PWPI	Patade Dhondiram Bahurao	6,173	7.78%	▼9.92
Margin of victory		1,043	1.32%	▼8.94
Turnout		81,121	80.69%	▲2.46
Total valid votes		79,296		
Registered electors		100,538		▲14.33
INC(I) gain from INC		Swing	▼14.21	

=== Assembly Election 1972 ===
1972 Maharashtra Legislative Assembly election : Gadhinglaj
Party	Candidate	Votes	%	±%
INC	Patil Baburao Satgauda	30,994	46.28%	▲6.49
Independent	Batkadli Nagapa Gurlingapa	24,121	36.02%	New
PWPI	Kolekar Tukaram Krishna	11,850	17.70%	▼29.71
Margin of victory		6,873	10.26%	▲2.64
Turnout		68,792	78.23%	▲7.43
Total valid votes		66,965		
Registered electors		87,935		▲16.82
INC gain from PWPI		Swing	▼1.13	

=== Assembly Election 1967 ===
1967 Maharashtra Legislative Assembly election : Gadhinglaj
Party	Candidate	Votes	%	±%
PWPI	T. K. Kolekar	23,687	47.41%	▲21.86
INC	P. R. Nalawaderao	19,881	39.79%	▼16.27
Independent	D. K. Daddikar	4,760	9.53%	New
Independent	B. M. Chaugale	1,636	3.27%	New
Margin of victory		3,806	7.62%	▼22.89
Turnout		53,294	70.80%	▲6.54
Total valid votes		49,964		
Registered electors		75,272		▲15.50
PWPI gain from INC		Swing	▼8.65	

=== Assembly Election 1962 ===
1962 Maharashtra Legislative Assembly election : Gadhinglaj
Party	Candidate	Votes	%	±%
INC	Nalawade Pandurang Alias Appasaheb Ramrao	22,074	56.06%	▲16.11
PWPI	Daynandeo Santram Narvekar	10,059	25.55%	▼21.51
PSP	Shrishailappa Mallappa Khanna	7,242	18.39%	New
Margin of victory		12,015	30.51%	▲23.40
Turnout		41,883	64.26%	▲4.51
Total valid votes		39,375		
Registered electors		65,173		▲7.46
INC gain from PWPI		Swing	▲9.00	

=== Assembly Election 1957 ===
1957 Bombay State Legislative Assembly election : Gadhinglaj
Party	Candidate	Votes	%	±%
PWPI	Narwekr Dnyandeo Santram	17,056	47.06%	New
INC	Patil Baburao Satgonda	14,478	39.95%	▼6.14
Independent	Shinde Dinkarrao Annasaheb	4,706	12.99%	New
Margin of victory		2,578	7.11%	▼12.12
Turnout		36,240	59.75%	▼9.49
Total valid votes		36,240		
Registered electors		60,651		▲5.09
PWPI gain from INC		Swing	▲0.97	

=== Assembly Election 1952 ===
1952 Bombay State Legislative Assembly election : Gadhinglaj
Party	Candidate	Votes	%	±%
INC	Shreshti Mahadeo Dundappa	18,419	46.09%	New
Independent	Desai Rakhamajirao Bapujirao	10,733	26.86%	New
Independent	Narvekar Diayandeo Shantaram	5,514	13.80%	New
Socialist	Mane Baburao Appaya	4,871	12.19%	New
Independent	Charati Shankar Gurlingappa	425	1.06%	New
Margin of victory		7,686	19.23%	
Turnout		39,962	69.24%	
Total valid votes		39,962		
Registered electors		57,712		
INC win (new seat)				
