= Dahanu Umbergaon Assembly constituency =

Constituency of the Maharashtra legislative assembly in India

Dahanu Umbergaon
- Former constituency for the Maharashtra Legislative Assembly

Constituency details
- Country: India
- Region: Western India
- State: Maharashtra
- Established: 1951
- Abolished: 1955
- Total electors: 1,10,734
- Reservation: ST

Dahanu–Umbergaon Assembly constituency was an assembly constituency in the Republic of India state of Maharashtra. After the 1955 Delimitation Act, its area was extended to Dahanu Assembly constituency and included some areas of the Palghar Jawhar Assembly constituency.

== Members of the Legislative Assembly ==
Election	Member	Party
1952	Shamrao Ramchandra Patil	Indian National Congress
1952	Bhimara Radka Rupji	Indian National Congress

== Election results ==
=== Assembly Election 1952 ===
1952 Bombay State Legislative Assembly election : Dahanu Umbergaon
Party	Candidate	Votes	%	±%
INC	Shamrao Ramchandra Patil	20,842	20.56%	New
INC	Bhimara Radka Rupji	19,742	19.48%	New
Socialist	Dhinda Lohanu Ladku	13,976	13.79%	New
Independent	Parulekar Godavari Shamrao	13,135	12.96%	New
Independent	Sapatya Shidva Deoji	10,951	10.80%	New
Socialist	Sheth Sampatkumar Gheverchand	9,602	9.47%	New
KLP	Patel Rama Bhula	7,064	6.97%	New
KLP	Pethe Mahadev Gopal	6,048	5.97%	New
Margin of victory		6,866	6.77%	
Turnout		101,360	45.77%	
Total valid votes		101,360		
Registered electors		110,734		
INC win (new seat)				
