= Mokhada Wada Shahapur Assembly constituency =

Constituency of the Maharashtra legislative assembly in India

Mokhada Wada Shahapur
- Former constituency for the Maharashtra Legislative Assembly

Constituency details
- Country: India
- Region: Western India
- State: Maharashtra
- District: Thane-Palghar District
- Lok Sabha constituency: ST
- Established: 1951
- Abolished: 1955
- Total electors: 68,202
- Reservation: None

Mokhada Wada Shahapur was an assembly constituency in the Indian state of Maharashtra.

== Members of the Legislative Assembly ==
Election	Member	Party
1952	Bhoir Ladku Nau	Independent politician
1952	Pawar Amrita Ragho	Indian National Congress

== Election results ==
=== Assembly Election 1952 ===
1952 Bombay State Legislative Assembly election : Mokhada Wada Shahapur
Party	Candidate	Votes	%	±%
Independent	Bhoir Ladku Nau	15,848	19.06%	New
INC	Baswant Sonu Dagdu	13,512	16.25%	New
INC	Pawar Amrita Ragho	12,958	15.58%	New
Independent	Bhere Krishna Ganu	12,563	15.11%	New
PWPI	Ambekar Yeshwant Gunaji	10,789	12.97%	New
Independent	Barora Soma Alo	9,553	11.49%	New
Socialist	Ughade Rama Krishna	7,937	9.54%	New
Margin of victory		2,336	2.81%	
Turnout		83,160	60.97%	
Total valid votes		83,160		
Registered electors		68,202		
Independent win (new seat)				
