= South Malegaon - Nandgao North Assembly constituency =

Constituency of the Maharashtra legislative assembly in India

South Malegaon - Nandgao North
- Former constituency for the Maharashtra Legislative Assembly

Constituency details
- Country: India
- Region: Western India
- State: Maharashtra
- Established: 1951
- Abolished: 1955
- Total electors: 59,790
- Reservation: None

South Malegaon - Nandgao North Assembly constituency was an assembly constituency in the India state of Maharashtra.

== Members of the Legislative Assembly ==
Election	Member	Party
1952	Hiray Bhausaheb Sakharam	Indian National Congress

== Election results ==
=== Assembly Election 1952 ===
1952 Bombay State Legislative Assembly election : South Malegaon - Nandgao North
Party	Candidate	Votes	%	±%
INC	Hiray Bhausaheb Sakharam	24,077	65.66%	New
Socialist	Pawar Kautik Anand	8,449	23.04%	New
Independent	Pardeshi Dodhusinha Nathu	4,141	11.29%	New
Margin of victory		15,628	42.62%	
Turnout		36,667	61.33%	
Total valid votes		36,667		
Registered electors		59,790		
INC win (new seat)				
