= East Satara Assembly constituency =

Constituency of the Maharashtra legislative assembly in India

East Satara
- Former constituency for the Maharashtra Legislative Assembly

Constituency details
- Country: India
- Region: Western India
- State: Maharashtra
- Established: 1951
- Abolished: 1955
- Total electors: 47,088
- Reservation: None

East Satara Assembly constituency was an assembly constituency in the India state of Maharashtra. After the 1955 Delimitation act, it was merged into Miraj and Satara constituencies.

== Members of the Legislative Assembly ==
Election	Member	Party
1952	Patil Vithal Nanasaheb	Kamgar Kisan Paksha

== Election results ==
=== Assembly Election 1952 ===
1952 Bombay State Legislative Assembly election : East Satara
Party	Candidate	Votes	%	±%
Kamgar Kisan Paksha	Patil Vithal Nanasaheb	9,128	33.87%	New
Independent	Hakim Ismail Noormahmad	5,022	18.63%	New
INC	Bhagwan Ibrahim Rassol	4,748	17.62%	New
Independent	Pawar Ghanashayam Ramkrishnasa	3,196	11.86%	New
Socialist	Bakshi Vinayak Krishna	1,462	5.42%	New
PWPI	Sawant Madhavrao Nanasaheb	1,015	3.77%	New
Independent	Ingawale Balkrishna Raghoji	831	3.08%	New
Independent	Sabale Shankerrao Sawalaram	791	2.93%	New
Independent	Majgaonkar Baburao Madhavrao	760	2.82%	New
Margin of victory		4,106	15.23%	
Turnout		26,953	57.24%	
Total valid votes		26,953		
Registered electors		47,088		
Kamgar Kisan Paksha win (new seat)				
