= Jalgaon Mhasawad Assembly constituency =

Constituency of the Maharashtra legislative assembly in India

Jalgaon Mhasawad
- Former constituency for the Maharashtra Legislative Assembly

Constituency details
- Country: India
- Region: Western India
- State: Maharashtra
- Established: 1951
- Abolished: 1955
- Total electors: 1,04,465
- Reservation: SC

Jalgaon Mhasawad Assembly constituency was an assembly constituency in the India state of Maharashtra.

== Members of the Legislative Assembly ==
Election	Member	Party
1952	Kandare Bhagwan Budhaji	Indian National Congress
1952	Bagwan Shaikh Gulam Rasul Haji Hasan	Indian National Congress

== Election results ==
=== Assembly Election 1952 ===
1952 Bombay State Legislative Assembly election : Jalgaon Mhasawad
Party	Candidate	Votes	%	±%
INC	Kandare Bhagwan Budhaji	29,464	27.37%	New
INC	Bagwan Shaikh Gulam Rasul Haji Hasan	23,537	21.86%	New
Socialist	Narkhede Krishna Mohan	11,268	10.47%	New
PWPI	Salunke Trimbak Tukaram	10,427	9.69%	New
SCF	Birhade Dhanji Ramchandra	8,029	7.46%	New
Independent	Jain Bhikamchand Mulchand	7,830	7.27%	New
CPI	Bhalerao Sadashiv Narayan	7,326	6.81%	New
Independent	Kalyani Hiralal Indal	5,874	5.46%	New
CPI	Medhe Senu Narayan	2,338	2.17%	New
Independent	Risbud Dattatraya Laxman	1,555	1.44%	New
Margin of victory		18,196	16.90%	
Turnout		107,648	103.05%	
Total valid votes		107,648		
Registered electors		104,465		
INC win (new seat)				
