= Mahim Dharavi Assembly constituency =

Constituency of the Maharashtra legislative assembly in India

Mahim Dharavi
- Former constituency for the Maharashtra Legislative Assembly

Constituency details
- Country: India
- Region: Western India
- State: Maharashtra
- Established: 1951
- Abolished: 1955
- Total electors: 56,553
- Reservation: None

Mahim Dharavi Assembly constituency was an assembly constituency in the India state of Maharashtra. After the 1955 Delimitation act, it was split into Worli, Mahim and Dadar constituencies.

== Members of the Legislative Assembly ==
Election	Member	Party
1952	Mohammad, Abdul Latif	Indian National Congress

== Election results ==
=== Assembly Election 1952 ===
1952 Bombay State Legislative Assembly election : Mahim Dharavi
Party	Candidate	Votes	%	±%
INC	Mohammad, Abdul Latif	13,326	43.21%	New
Socialist	Pinto, Frederick Michael (Peter)	11,737	38.06%	New
Independent	Kataria, Takandas Hemraj	3,655	11.85%	New
PWPI	Gavle, Ramchandra Sambahji	1,693	5.49%	New
Independent	Haridas Vishin Singh	429	1.39%	New
Margin of victory		1,589	5.15%	
Turnout		30,840	54.53%	
Total valid votes		30,840		
Registered electors		56,553		
INC win (new seat)				
