= Lalbaug Parel Assembly constituency =

Constituency of the Maharashtra legislative assembly in India

Lalbaug Parel
- Former constituency for the Maharashtra Legislative Assembly

Constituency details
- Country: India
- Region: Western India
- State: Maharashtra
- Established: 1951
- Abolished: 1955
- Total electors: 49,571
- Reservation: None

Lalbaug Parel Assembly constituency was an assembly constituency in the India state of Maharashtra.

== Members of the Legislative Assembly ==
Election	Member	Party
1952	Desai, Madhav Dattatraya	Indian National Congress

== Election results ==
=== Assembly Election 1952 ===
1952 Bombay State Legislative Assembly election : Lalbaug Parel
Party	Candidate	Votes	%	±%
INC	Desai, Madhav Dattatraya	11,756	38.83%	New
Socialist	Donde, Moreshwar Vasudeo	8,203	27.09%	New
CPI	Patkar, Sawlaram Gopal	7,742	25.57%	New
Independent	Pala, Mahadev Khema	1,817	6.00%	New
RRP	Sharma, Sarladevi Virendra	465	1.54%	New
Independent	Kumari Shah, Tara Virji	292	0.96%	New
Margin of victory		3,553	11.74%	
Turnout		30,275	61.07%	
Total valid votes		30,275		
Registered electors		49,571		
INC win (new seat)				
