= Barsi North Assembly constituency =

Constituency of the Maharashtra legislative assembly in India

Barsi North
- Former constituency for the Maharashtra Legislative Assembly

Constituency details
- Country: India
- Region: Western India
- State: Maharashtra
- Established: 1951
- Abolished: 1955
- Total electors: 55,197
- Reservation: None

Barsi North Assembly constituency was an assembly constituency in the India state of Maharashtra.

== Members of the Legislative Assembly ==
Election	Member	Party
1952	Deshmukh Narsing Tatya	Peasants and Workers Party of India

== Election results ==
=== Assembly Election 1952 ===
1952 Bombay State Legislative Assembly election : Barsi North
Party	Candidate	Votes	%	±%
PWPI	Deshmukh Narsing Tatya	15,462	43.84%	New
INC	Supekar Mahadeo Shankar	9,849	27.93%	New
Independent	Zadbuke Ganpat Ramling	8,020	22.74%	New
Independent	Dambre Krishna Bandu	1,937	5.49%	New
Margin of victory		5,613	15.92%	
Turnout		35,268	63.89%	
Total valid votes		35,268		
Registered electors		55,197		
PWPI win (new seat)				
