= Girgaum Khetwadi Assembly constituency =

Constituency of the Maharashtra legislative assembly in India

Girgaum Khetwadi
- Former constituency for the Maharashtra Legislative Assembly

Constituency details
- Country: India
- Region: Western India
- State: Maharashtra
- Established: 1951
- Abolished: 1955
- Total electors: 51,725
- Reservation: None

Girgaum Khetwadi Assembly constituency was an assembly constituency in the India state of Maharashtra. After the 1955 Delimitation act, it was merged into Girgaum constituency.

== Members of the Legislative Assembly ==
Election	Member	Party
1952	Banker Lilavati Dhirajlal	Indian National Congress

== Election results ==
=== Assembly Election 1952 ===
1952 Bombay State Legislative Assembly election : Girgaum Khetwadi
Party	Candidate	Votes	%	±%
INC	Banker Lilavati Dhirajlal	14,410	48.39%	New
Socialist	Kavlekar Sushil Shreeniwas	8,191	27.51%	New
Independent	Bakhale Raghunath Ramchandra	4,852	16.29%	New
ABHM	Wagh Bhaskar Dattarav	1,517	5.09%	New
KMPP	Varad Chhanappa Veersangappa	809	2.72%	New
Margin of victory		6,219	20.88%	
Turnout		29,779	57.57%	
Total valid votes		29,779		
Registered electors		51,725		
INC win (new seat)				
