= Konnur Assembly constituency =

Constituency of the Karnataka legislative assembly in India

Konnur
- Former constituency for the Karnataka Legislative Assembly

Constituency details
- Country: India
- Region: South India
- State: Karnataka
- Established: 1951
- Abolished: 1955
- Total electors: 55,761

Konnur Assembly constituency was an assembly constituency in the India state of Karnataka.

== Members of the Legislative Assembly ==
Election	Member	Party
1952	Shaikh Khadirsab Abdulsab	Indian National Congress

== Election results ==
=== Assembly Election 1952 ===
1952 Bombay State Legislative Assembly election : Konnur
Party	Candidate	Votes	%	±%
INC	Shaikh Khadirsab Abdulsab	22,200	67.95%	New
KMPP	Angadi Padmavati Shanmukhappa	5,926	18.14%	New
SP	Karguppi Venkatash Annaji	4,546	13.91%	New
Margin of victory		16,274	49.81%	
Turnout		32,672	58.59%	
Total valid votes		32,672		
Registered electors		55,761		
INC win (new seat)				
