= Walkeshwar Mahalaxmi Assembly constituency =

Constituency of the Maharashtra legislative assembly in India

Walkeshwar Mahalaxmi
- Former constituency for the Maharashtra Legislative Assembly

Constituency details
- Country: India
- Region: Western India
- State: Maharashtra
- Established: 1952
- Abolished: 1955
- Total electors: 50,934

Walkeshwar Mahalaxmi Assembly constituency was an assembly constituency in the India state of Maharashtra. After 1955 Delimitation act, it was split into Walkeshwar and Mahalaxmi.

== Members of the Legislative Assembly ==
Election	Member	Party
1952	Taleyarkhan, Homi Jehangirji	Indian National Congress

== Election results ==
=== Assembly Election 1952 ===
1952 Bombay State Legislative Assembly election : Walkeshwar Mahalaxmi
Party	Candidate	Votes	%	±%
INC	Taleyarkhan, Homi Jehangirji	9,664	36.41%	New
Socialist	Dave, Rohit Manushankar	6,306	23.76%	New
Independent	Mehta, Rusi Homi	5,494	20.70%	New
Independent	Kulkarni, Sitaram Subrao	3,774	14.22%	New
RRP	Kamdar, Jyesthamal Morarji	1,306	4.92%	New
Margin of victory		3,358	12.65%	
Turnout		26,544	52.11%	
Total valid votes		26,544		
Registered electors		50,934		
INC win (new seat)				
