= Chinchpokli Lower Parel Love Grove Assembly constituency =

Constituency of the Maharashtra legislative assembly in India

Chinchpokli Lower Parel Love Grove
- Former constituency for the Maharashtra Legislative Assembly

Constituency details
- Country: India
- Region: Western India
- State: Maharashtra
- Established: 1951
- Abolished: 1955
- Total electors: 100,351
- Reservation: SC

Chinchpokli Lower Parel Love Grove Assembly constituency was an assembly constituency in the India state of Maharashtra.

== Members of the Legislative Assembly ==
Election	Member	Party
1952	Jha, Bhagirath Sadanand	Socialist Party
1952	Kamble, Bapu Chandrasen	Scheduled Castes Federation

== Election results ==
=== Assembly Election 1952 ===
1952 Bombay State Legislative Assembly election : Chinchpokli Lower Parel Love Grove
Party	Candidate	Votes	%	±%
Socialist	Jha, Bhagirath Sadanand	23,503	24.71%	New
SCF	Kamble, Bapu Chandrasen	20,550	21.61%	New
INC	Mahajn, Narsinh Hari	17,910	18.83%	New
Independent	Ganaeharya, Gulabrao Bhaurao	15,339	16.13%	New
INC	Vatharkar Dattatray Gunoji	13,701	14.41%	New
RRP	Mishra, Sachhidanand Khandarpnarayan	2,426	2.55%	New
Independent	Sarude, Ramchandra Bapu	1,672	1.76%	New
Margin of victory		5,593	5.88%	
Turnout		95,101	47.38%	
Total valid votes		95,101		
Registered electors		100,351		
Socialist win (new seat)				
