= Sewri Kalachowki-Naigam Vadala Assembly constituency =

Constituency of the Maharashtra legislative assembly in India

Sewri Kalachowki-Naigam Vadala
- Former constituency for the Maharashtra Legislative Assembly

Constituency details
- Country: India
- Region: Western India
- State: Maharashtra
- Established: 1951
- Abolished: 1955
- Total electors: 1,06,791
- Reservation: None

Sewri–Kalachowki–Naigaon–Wadala Assembly constituency was a former assembly constituency in the Republic of India state of Maharashtra. Following the 1955 Delimitation Act, the constituency was merged into the Sewree Assembly constituency.

== Members of the Legislative Assembly ==
Election	Member	Party
1952	Mane, Madhav Ganpatrao	Socialist Party
1952	Shivtarkar, Sitaram Namdeo	Indian National Congress

== Election results ==
=== Assembly Election 1952 ===
1952 Bombay State Legislative Assembly election : Sewri Kalachowki-Naigam Vadala
Party	Candidate	Votes	%	±%
Socialist	Mane, Madhav Ganpatrao	23,596	23.03%	New
INC	Damle, Dattatraya Ganesh	21,272	20.76%	New
INC	Shivtarkar, Sitaram Namdeo	19,890	19.41%	New
SCF	Bhandare, Ramchandra Dhondiba	19,337	18.87%	New
CPI	Rangachari Avioor, Shrinivas	16,160	15.77%	New
RRP	Singh, Ramsingh Raghoprasad	2,216	2.16%	New
Margin of victory		2,324	2.27%	
Turnout		102,471	47.98%	
Total valid votes		102,471		
Registered electors		106,791		
Socialist win (new seat)				
