= Dangs Surgan Peiant Dindori Assembly constituency =

Constituency of the Maharashtra legislative assembly in India

Dangs Surgan Peiant Dindori
- Former constituency for the Maharashtra Legislative Assembly

Constituency details
- Country: India
- Region: Western India
- State: Maharashtra
- Established: 1951
- Abolished: 1955
- Total electors: 1,04,770
- Reservation: ST

Dangs Surgan Peiant Dindori Assembly constituency was an assembly constituency in the India state of Maharashtra.

== Members of the Legislative Assembly ==
Election	Member	Party
1952	Jadhav Anant Lahanu	Indian National Congress
1952	Thorat Raosaheb Bhausaheb	Indian National Congress

== Election results ==
=== Assembly Election 1952 ===
1952 Bombay State Legislative Assembly election : Dangs Surgan Peiant Dindori
Party	Candidate	Votes	%	±%
INC	Jadhav Anant Lahanu	13,053	16.79%	New
INC	Thorat Raosaheb Bhausaheb	10,479	13.48%	New
PWPI	Potinde Shankarrao Bhikaji	8,391	10.79%	New
Independent	Dhodia Narayanbhai Lachabha	7,872	10.12%	New
PWPI	Shinde Namdeo Runjaji	6,225	8.01%	New
Independent	Patel Ambalal Khushalbhai	6,010	7.73%	New
Kamgar Kisan Paksha	Ghute Khanderao Sajan	5,269	6.78%	New
Independent	Bhatewara Maneklal Amolakchand	5,178	6.66%	New
Kamgar Kisan Paksha	Thete Balwant Trimbak	5,071	6.52%	New
Independent	Khambait Abaji Ragho	4,509	5.80%	New
Margin of victory		4,662	6.00%	
Turnout		77,754	37.11%	
Total valid votes		77,754		
Registered electors		104,770		
INC win (new seat)				
