= Poona City South East Assembly constituency =

Constituency of the Maharashtra legislative assembly in India

Poona City South East
- Former constituency for the Maharashtra Legislative Assembly

Constituency details
- Country: India
- Region: Western India
- State: Maharashtra
- Established: 1951
- Abolished: 1955
- Total electors: 60,298
- Reservation: None

Poona City South East Assembly constituency was an assembly constituency in the India state of Maharashtra.

== Members of the Legislative Assembly ==
Election	Member	Party
1952	Shah Popatlal Ramchand	Indian National Congress

== Election results ==
=== Assembly Election 1952 ===
1952 Bombay State Legislative Assembly election : Poona City South East
Party	Candidate	Votes	%	±%
INC	Shah Popatlal Ramchand	18,201	61.17%	New
Socialist	Kirad Jagannath Raghunath	6,828	22.95%	New
PWPI	Dhere Amrutrao Keshavrao	2,164	7.27%	New
Independent	Lulla Nandlal Shivaldas	1,344	4.52%	New
Kamgar Kisan Paksha	Nathoji Balakram Prasanna	1,217	4.09%	New
Margin of victory		11,373	38.22%	
Turnout		29,754	49.34%	
Total valid votes		29,754		
Registered electors		60,298		
INC win (new seat)				
