= Bhuleshwar Market Assembly constituency =

Constituency of the Maharashtra legislative assembly in India

Bhuleshwar Market
- Former constituency for the Maharashtra Legislative Assembly

Constituency details
- Country: India
- Region: Western India
- State: Maharashtra
- Established: 1951
- Abolished: 1955
- Total electors: 55,023
- Reservation: None

Bhuleshwar Market Assembly constituency was an assembly constituency in the India state of Maharashtra.

== Members of the Legislative Assembly ==
Election	Member	Party
1952	Shah Kodardas Kalidas	Indian National Congress

== Election results ==
=== Assembly Election 1952 ===
1952 Bombay State Legislative Assembly election : Bhuleshwar Market
Party	Candidate	Votes	%	±%
INC	Shah Kodardas Kalidas	21,046	68.56%	New
Socialist	Mehta Vimla Gordhandas	4,060	13.23%	New
RRP	Pandya Manubhai Chandra Vidyanand	1,730	5.64%	New
Independent	Goragandhi Mansen Puspsen	1,679	5.47%	New
Independent	Desai Manibhai Gopalji	1,597	5.20%	New
Independent	Sheth Tulsidas Pranjivan	584	1.90%	New
Margin of victory		16,986	55.34%	
Turnout		30,696	55.79%	
Total valid votes		30,696		
Registered electors		55,023		
INC win (new seat)				
