= Dapoli Khed Assembly constituency =

Constituency of the Maharashtra legislative assembly in India

Dapoli Khed
- Former constituency for the Maharashtra Legislative Assembly

Constituency details
- Country: India
- Region: Western India
- State: Maharashtra
- Established: 1951
- Abolished: 1955
- Total electors: 52,891
- Reservation: None

Dapoli Khed Assembly constituency was an assembly constituency in the India state of Maharashtra. After the 1955 Delimitation act, it was merged into Dapoli constituency.

== Members of the Legislative Assembly ==
Election	Member	Party
1952	Parkar Wajuddin Ahmed	Indian National Congress

== Election results ==
=== Assembly Election 1952 ===
1952 Bombay State Legislative Assembly election : Dapoli Khed
Party	Candidate	Votes	%	±%
INC	Parkar Wajuddin Ahmed	8,004	33.34%	New
SCF	Patne Jagannath Shivram	4,867	20.27%	New
Independent	Karandikar Shivram Laxman	3,441	14.33%	New
Independent	Tambe Mohamed Amin Wajeer Mohammed	2,199	9.16%	New
Independent	More Vasant Atmaram	1,899	7.91%	New
Independent	Rakhange Sk. Uaman Sk. Abdulla	1,309	5.45%	New
Independent	Sakpal Ganpat Kashiram	1,226	5.11%	New
Independent	Phatak Bhargao Mahadeo	1,064	4.43%	New
Margin of victory		3,137	13.07%	
Turnout		24,009	45.39%	
Total valid votes		24,009		
Registered electors		52,891		
INC win (new seat)				
