= Panvel Karjat Matheran Khalapur Assembly constituency =

Constituency of the Maharashtra legislative assembly in India

Panvel Karjat Matheran Khalapur
- Former constituency for the Maharashtra Legislative Assembly

Constituency details
- Country: India
- Region: Western India
- State: Maharashtra
- Established: 1951
- Abolished: 1955
- Total electors: 1,02,000
- Reservation: None

Panvel Karjat Matheran Khalapur Assembly constituency was an assembly constituency in the India state of Maharashtra. After the 1955 Delimitation act, it was split into Panvel and Karjat constituencies.

== Members of the Legislative Assembly ==
Election	Member	Party
1952	Padir Manohar Kushaha	Indian National Congress
1952	Thosar Narhar Parsharam	Indian National Congress

== Election results ==
=== Assembly Election 1952 ===
1952 Bombay State Legislative Assembly election : Panvel Karjat Matheran Khalapur
Party	Candidate	Votes	%	±%
INC	Padir Manohar Kushaha	17,284	19.62%	New
INC	Thosar Narhar Parsharam	16,201	18.39%	New
PWPI	Bangar Mavji Laxman	13,185	14.97%	New
PWPI	Raut Vasant Rajaram	12,894	14.64%	New
Socialist	Darvada Ambo Kamloo	7,416	8.42%	New
Socialist	Hirve Tulsiram Balkrishna	7,050	8.00%	New
Independent	Patil Gangaram Nagu	5,986	6.80%	New
ABHM	Katkari Pandu Ganu	3,241	3.68%	New
ABHM	Vaidya Bachaji Shivram	2,600	2.95%	New
Independent	Wajekar Tukaram Hari	2,226	2.53%	New
Margin of victory		4,099	4.65%	
Turnout		88,083	43.18%	
Total valid votes		88,083		
Registered electors		102,000		
INC win (new seat)				
