= Chembur-Ghatkopar and Villages and Sion North Assembly constituency =

Constituency of the Maharashtra legislative assembly in India

Chembur-Ghatkopar And Villages And Sion North
- Former constituency for the Maharashtra Legislative Assembly

Constituency details
- Country: India
- Region: Western India
- State: Maharashtra
- Established: 1951
- Abolished: 1955
- Total electors: 53,755
- Reservation: None

Chembur-Ghatkopar and Villages and Sion North Assembly constituency was an assembly constituency in the India state of Maharashtra.

== Members of the Legislative Assembly ==
Election	Member	Party
1952	Mehta, Ratilal Bechardas	Indian National Congress

== Election results ==
=== Assembly Election 1952 ===
1952 Bombay State Legislative Assembly election : Chembur-Ghatkopar and Villages and Sion North
Party	Candidate	Votes	%	±%
INC	Mehta, Ratilal Bechardas	14,804	50.75%	New
Socialist	Bulchandani Ramchand Kishinchand	7,698	26.39%	New
RRP	Kabali, Purshottamdas Meghji	3,797	13.02%	New
Independent	Mehra, Parmanand Sugnomal	1,993	6.83%	New
Independent	Karnik, Bhalchandra Balkrishna	877	3.01%	New
Margin of victory		7,106	24.36%	
Turnout		29,169	54.26%	
Total valid votes		29,169		
Registered electors		53,755		
INC win (new seat)				
