= Nashik Igatpuri Assembly constituency =

Constituency of the Maharashtra legislative assembly in India

Nashik Igatpuri
- Former constituency for the Maharashtra Legislative Assembly

Constituency details
- Country: India
- Region: Western India
- State: Maharashtra
- Established: 1951
- Abolished: 1955
- Total electors: 1,62,645
- Reservation: 3-member constituency (1 unreserved seat and 1 each reserved for SC and ST)

Nashik Igatpuri was an assembly constituency in the Indian state of Maharashtra. After the 1955 Delimitation act, it was split into Nashik and Igatpuri constituencies.

== Members of the Legislative Assembly ==
Election	Member	Party
1952	Dattatraya Tulshiram Kale	Indian National Congress
1952	Murkute, Pandurang Mahadeo	Indian National Congress
1952	Pawar, Bhikha Trimbak	Indian National Congress

== Election results ==
=== Assembly Election 1952 ===
1952 Bombay State Legislative Assembly election : Nashik Igatpuri
Party	Candidate	Votes	%	±%
INC	Dattatraya Tulshiram Kale	29,782	14.54%	New
INC	Murkute, Pandurang Mahadeo	26,563	12.97%	New
INC	Pawar, Bhikha Trimbak	23,306	11.38%	New
SCF	Gaikwad, Bhaurao Krishnarao	18,005	8.79%	New
Socialist	Bendkule, Ganpat Dhondiba	15,996	7.81%	New
Socialist	Limaye, Madhav Purushottam	14,798	7.22%	New
PWPI	Handge, Vithal Ganpat	12,534	6.12%	New
PWPI	Khetade Laxman Thakuji	10,406	5.08%	New
CPI	Govardhane Punjaji Laxman	9,423	4.60%	New
Kamgar Kisan Paksha	Bhangare, Ramchandra Namdeo	9,374	4.58%	New
Margin of victory		11,777	5.75%	
Turnout		204,878	41.99%	
Total valid votes		204,878		
Registered electors		162,645		
INC win (new seat)				
