= Savantwadi Assembly constituency =

Constituency of the Maharashtra legislative assembly in India

Savantwadi
- Former constituency for the Maharashtra Legislative Assembly

Constituency details
- Country: India
- Region: Western India
- State: Maharashtra
- Established: 1951
- Abolished: 1955
- Total electors: 54,113
- Reservation: None

Savantwadi Assembly constituency was an assembly constituency in the India state of Maharashtra.

== Members of the Legislative Assembly ==
Election	Member	Party
1952	Bhonsle Prataprao Deorao	Indian National Congress

== Election results ==
=== Assembly Election 1952 ===
1952 Bombay State Legislative Assembly election : Savantwadi
Party	Candidate	Votes	%	±%
INC	Bhonsle Prataprao Deorao	12,058	51.80%	New
Socialist	Chavan Anand Krishnaji	3,177	13.65%	New
PWPI	Naik Namdeo Wasudeo	2,999	12.88%	New
Independent	Lele Ganesh Sadashiv	2,100	9.02%	New
Independent	Rangnekar Ramrao Shankar	1,681	7.22%	New
Independent	Fernandez Luise Mingel	1,264	5.43%	New
Margin of victory		8,881	38.15%	
Turnout		23,279	43.02%	
Total valid votes		23,279		
Registered electors		54,113		
INC win (new seat)				
