= Shrirampur Newasa Assembly constituency =

Constituency of the Maharashtra legislative assembly in India

Shrirampur Newasa
- Former constituency for the Maharashtra Legislative Assembly

Constituency details
- Country: India
- Region: Western India
- State: Maharashtra
- Established: 1951
- Abolished: 1955
- Total electors: 55,394
- Reservation: None

Shrirampur Newasa Assembly constituency was an assembly constituency in the India state of Maharashtra.

== Members of the Legislative Assembly ==
Election	Member	Party
1952	Chaugule Bhaurao Govindrao	Indian National Congress

== Election results ==
=== Assembly Election 1952 ===
1952 Bombay State Legislative Assembly election : Shrirampur Newasa
Party	Candidate	Votes	%	±%
INC	Chaugule Bhaurao Govindrao	13,534	53.21%	New
Kamgar Kisan Paksha	Patil Sakharam Shripatrao	7,555	29.71%	New
Socialist	Pawar Sharangdhar Radhaji	4,344	17.08%	New
Margin of victory		5,979	23.51%	
Turnout		25,433	45.91%	
Total valid votes		25,433		
Registered electors		55,394		
INC win (new seat)				
