= Barsi Madha Assembly constituency =

Constituency of the Maharashtra legislative assembly in India

Barsi Madha
- Former constituency for the Maharashtra Legislative Assembly

Constituency details
- Country: India
- Region: Western India
- State: Maharashtra
- Established: 1951
- Abolished: 1955
- Total electors: 66,236
- Reservation: None

Barsi Madha Assembly constituency was an assembly constituency in the India state of Maharashtra.

== Members of the Legislative Assembly ==
Election	Member	Party
1952	Jadhav Tulshidas Saubhanrao	Peasants and Workers Party of India

== Election results ==
=== Assembly Election 1952 ===
1952 Bombay State Legislative Assembly election : Barsi Madha
Party	Candidate	Votes	%	±%
PWPI	Jadhav Tulshidas Saubhanrao	26,174	63.46%	New
INC	Sathe Ganpat Dhondiba	15,071	36.54%	New
Margin of victory		11,103	26.92%	
Turnout		41,245	62.27%	
Total valid votes		41,245		
Registered electors		66,236		
PWPI win (new seat)				
