= Wai Khandala Assembly constituency =

Constituency of the Maharashtra legislative assembly in India

Wai Khandala
- Former constituency for the Maharashtra Legislative Assembly

Constituency details
- Country: India
- Region: Western India
- State: Maharashtra
- Established: 1951
- Abolished: 1955
- Total electors: 64,747

Wai Khandala Assembly constituency was an assembly constituency in the India state of Maharashtra. After 1955 Delimitation act, it was split into Wai and Phaltan.

== Members of the Legislative Assembly ==
Election	Member	Party
1952	Dadasaheb Khasherao Jagtap	Peasants and Workers Party of India

== Election results ==
=== Assembly Election 1952 ===
1952 Bombay State Legislative Assembly election : Wai Khandala
Party	Candidate	Votes	%	±%
PWPI	Dadasaheb Khasherao Jagtap	19,395	50.20%	New
INC	Veer Kisan Mahadeo	17,131	44.34%	New
Independent	Dhamal Mahadeo Sidaram	1,177	3.05%	New
Independent	Homane Dinkar Ganpati	931	2.41%	New
Margin of victory		2,264	5.86%	
Turnout		38,634	59.67%	
Total valid votes		38,634		
Registered electors		64,747		
PWPI win (new seat)				
