= Panhala Bawda Assembly constituency =

Constituency of the Maharashtra legislative assembly in India

Panhala Bawda
- Former constituency for the Maharashtra Legislative Assembly

Constituency details
- Country: India
- Region: Western India
- State: Maharashtra
- Established: 1951
- Abolished: 1955
- Total electors: 56,427

Panhala Bawda Assembly constituency was an assembly constituency in the India state of Maharashtra. After the 1955 Delimitation act, it was added to Panhala Assembly constituency.

== Members of the Legislative Assembly ==
Election	Member	Party
1952	Sawant Atmaram Pandurang	Peasants and Workers Party of India

== Election results ==
=== Assembly Election 1952 ===
1952 Bombay State Legislative Assembly election : Panhala Bawda
Party	Candidate	Votes	%	±%
PWPI	Sawant Atmaram Pandurang	6,158	30.81%	New
INC	Sasane Dnyanu Joti	5,077	25.40%	New
Independent	Patil Sadashiv Doulatrao	4,903	24.53%	New
Independent	Raorane Appasaheb Atmaram	1,686	8.43%	New
Socialist	Rane Vasudeo Murari	1,575	7.88%	New
Independent	Jagtap Namdeo Dnyanoba	590	2.95%	New
Margin of victory		1,081	5.41%	
Turnout		19,989	35.42%	
Total valid votes		19,989		
Registered electors		56,427		
PWPI win (new seat)				
