= Bhivandi Murbad East Kalyan Assembly constituency =

Constituency of the Maharashtra legislative assembly in India

Bhiwandi Murbad East Kalyan
- Former constituency for the Maharashtra Legislative Assembly

Constituency details
- Country: India
- Region: Western India
- State: Maharashtra
- Established: 1952
- Abolished: 1955
- Total electors: 109,005
- Reservation: SC

Bhiwandi Murbad East Kalyan Assembly constituency was an assembly constituency in the India state of Maharashtra. In 1955 Delimitation act, it was split into Bhiwandi and Murbad.

== Members of the Legislative Assembly ==
Election	Member	Party
1952	Fakih Mustafa Gulamnabi	Indian National Congress
1952	Jadhav Pandurang Dharmaji	Indian National Congress

== Election results ==
=== Assembly Election 1952 ===
1952 Bombay State Legislative Assembly election : Bhiwandi Murbad East Kalyan
Party	Candidate	Votes	%	±%
INC	Fakih Mustafa Gulamnabi	21,268	19.90%	New
INC	Jadhav Pandurang Dharmaji	19,436	18.18%	New
Independent	Gholap Raghunath Ramchandra	11,776	11.02%	New
Socialist	Pradhan Trimbak Raoji	9,349	8.75%	New
SCF	Bhatankar Jaganath Ganpat	8,926	8.35%	New
PWPI	Patil Bhalchandra Shivaram	7,926	7.42%	New
Independent	Donde Bhaurao Vithu	7,837	7.33%	New
Independent	Acharya Sakharam Krishnarao	7,303	6.83%	New
CPI	Maddu Ibrahim Mohomad Hussain	7,073	6.62%	New
Independent	Patil Shivram Krishna	5,989	5.60%	New
Margin of victory		9,492	8.88%	
Turnout		106,883	49.03%	
Total valid votes		106,883		
Registered electors		109,005		
INC win (new seat)				
