= Matunga Sion Koliwada Assembly constituency =

Constituency of the Maharashtra legislative assembly in India

Matunga Sion Koliwada
- Former constituency for the Maharashtra Legislative Assembly

Constituency details
- Country: India
- Region: Western India
- State: Maharashtra
- Established: 1951
- Abolished: 1955
- Total electors: 54,412
- Reservation: None

Matunga Sion Koliwada Assembly constituency was an assembly constituency in the India state of Maharashtra. After the 1955 Delimitation act, it was merged into Matunga and Nanded constituencies.

== Members of the Legislative Assembly ==
Election	Member	Party
1952	Subramaniam Salivati	Indian National Congress

== Election results ==
=== Assembly Election 1952 ===
1952 Bombay State Legislative Assembly election : Matunga Sion Koliwada
Party	Candidate	Votes	%	±%
INC	Subramaniam Salivati	14,588	46.87%	New
Socialist	Bhat,. U. U	8,880	28.53%	New
Independent	Desai, Ratilal Ichharam	3,254	10.46%	New
CPI	Sundaram, Ganpat	2,597	8.34%	New
Independent	More, Baburao Shantaram	751	2.41%	New
RRP	Athavale, Ramchandra Mahadev	596	1.92%	New
Independent	Srikantia Nanjappa	456	1.47%	New
Margin of victory		5,708	18.34%	
Turnout		31,122	57.20%	
Total valid votes		31,122		
Registered electors		54,412		
INC win (new seat)				
