= West Satara Assembly constituency =

Constituency of the Maharashtra legislative assembly in India

West Satara
- Former constituency for the Maharashtra Legislative Assembly

Constituency details
- Country: India
- Region: Western India
- State: Maharashtra
- Established: 1951
- Abolished: 1955
- Total electors: 45,737
- Reservation: None

West Satara Assembly constituency was an assembly constituency in the India state of Maharashtra. After the 1955 Delimitation act, it was merged into Miraj and Satara constituencies.

== Members of the Legislative Assembly ==
Election	Member	Party
1952	Ghorpade Baburao Balasaheb	Indian National Congress

== Election results ==
=== Assembly Election 1952 ===
1952 Bombay State Legislative Assembly election : West Satara
Party	Candidate	Votes	%	±%
INC	Ghorpade Baburao Balasaheb	5,414	23.41%	New
Kamgar Kisan Paksha	Dhane Rajaram Doulu	4,123	17.83%	New
Independent	Patankar Gopalrao Laxmanrao	3,032	13.11%	New
Independent	Tarlekar Laxman Vithoba	2,855	12.35%	New
Independent	Vangade Rauba Bhau	2,302	9.96%	New
SCF	Sawant Khanderao Sakharam	2,223	9.61%	New
PWPI	Jadhav Baburao Dada	1,786	7.72%	New
Independent	Jadhav Krishnaji Maruti	838	3.62%	New
Independent	Kadam Tatyaba Bhagwantrao	550	2.38%	New
Margin of victory		1,291	5.58%	
Turnout		23,123	50.56%	
Total valid votes		23,123		
Registered electors		45,737		
INC win (new seat)				
