= Boribunder Marine Lines Assembly constituency =

Constituency of the Maharashtra legislative assembly in India

Boribunder Marine Lines
- Former constituency for the Maharashtra Legislative Assembly

Constituency details
- Country: India
- Region: Western India
- State: Maharashtra
- Established: 1951
- Abolished: 1955
- Total electors: 53,635
- Reservation: None

Boribunder Marine Lines Assembly constituency was an assembly constituency in the India state of Maharashtra.

== Members of the Legislative Assembly ==
Election	Member	Party
1952	Narola Kailas Narain Shivanarain Alias Dr. Kailas	Indian National Congress

== Election results ==
=== Assembly Election 1952 ===
1952 Bombay State Legislative Assembly election : Boribunder Marine Lines
Party	Candidate	Votes	%	±%
INC	Narola Kailas Narain Shivanarain Alias Dr. Kailas	13,670	50.98%	New
Socialist	Hutheesing Gunottam Purshottam	10,194	38.02%	New
Independent	Bedi Awtarshingh Harnamsingh	2,949	11.00%	New
Margin of victory		3,476	12.96%	
Turnout		26,813	49.99%	
Total valid votes		26,813		
Registered electors		53,635		
INC win (new seat)				
