= Kolhapur City Assembly constituency =

Constituency of the Maharashtra legislative assembly in India

Kolhapur City
- Former constituency for the Maharashtra Legislative Assembly

Constituency details
- Country: India
- Region: Western India
- State: Maharashtra
- Established: 1951
- Abolished: 1955
- Total electors: 61,100
- Reservation: None

Kolhapur City Assembly constituency was an assembly constituency in the India state of Maharashtra.

== Members of the Legislative Assembly ==
Election	Member	Party
1952	Baralay Balvant Dhondo	Peasants and Workers Party of India

== Election results ==
=== Assembly Election 1952 ===
1952 Bombay State Legislative Assembly election : Kolhapur City
Party	Candidate	Votes	%	±%
PWPI	Baralay Balvant Dhondo	10,909	34.91%	New
INC	Jadhav Ganpatrao Govindrao	8,923	28.55%	New
Socialist	Sabnis Urmila Laxman	5,035	16.11%	New
Independent	Kinkar Keshav Vyankatesh	2,123	6.79%	New
Independent	Hakim Mhamulal Sadulla Khan	1,259	4.03%	New
Independent	Sadolikar Vasant Waman	1,061	3.40%	New
Independent	Prabhavale Shankar Balwant	660	2.11%	New
Independent	Vadgaonkar Anant Rangappa	590	1.89%	New
Independent	More Maruti Tatoba	409	1.31%	New
Independent	Padalkar Annappa Babu	281	0.90%	New
Margin of victory		1,986	6.36%	
Turnout		31,250	51.15%	
Total valid votes		31,250		
Registered electors		61,100		
PWPI win (new seat)				
