= Murud Shrivardhan Assembly constituency =

Constituency of the Maharashtra legislative assembly in India

Murud Shrivardhan
- Former constituency for the Maharashtra Legislative Assembly

Constituency details
- Country: India
- Region: Western India
- State: Maharashtra
- Established: 1951
- Abolished: 1955
- Total electors: 50,585
- Reservation: None

Murud Shrivardhan Assembly constituency was an assembly constituency in the India state of Maharashtra.

== Members of the Legislative Assembly ==
Election	Member	Party
1952	Dighe Bhaskar Narayan	Indian National Congress

== Election results ==
=== Assembly Election 1952 ===
1952 Bombay State Legislative Assembly election : Murud Shrivardhan
Party	Candidate	Votes	%	±%
INC	Dighe Bhaskar Narayan	17,430	62.95%	New
PWPI	Virkud Moreshwar Govind	5,976	21.58%	New
Socialist	Dalvi Madhukar Yeshwant	4,282	15.47%	New
Margin of victory		11,454	41.37%	
Turnout		27,688	54.74%	
Total valid votes		27,688		
Registered electors		50,585		
INC win (new seat)				
