= Yeola Nandgaon Assembly constituency =

Constituency of the Maharashtra legislative assembly in India

Yeola Nandgaon
- Former constituency for the Maharashtra Legislative Assembly

Constituency details
- Country: India
- Region: Western India
- State: Maharashtra
- Established: 1952
- Abolished: 1955
- Total electors: 61,916
- Reservation: None

Yeola Nandgaon Assembly constituency was an assembly constituency in the India state of Maharashtra. After 1955 Delimitation act, Yeola split into Yeola and Nandgaon.

== Members of the Legislative Assembly ==
Election	Member	Party
1952	Shinde (Patil) Madhavrao Trimbak	Indian National Congress

== Election results ==
=== Assembly Election 1952 ===
1952 Bombay State Legislative Assembly election : Yeola Nandgaon
Party	Candidate	Votes	%	±%
INC	Shinde (Patil) Madhavrao Trimbak	20,496	62.65%	New
SCF	Maru Shivram Palaji	8,260	25.25%	New
Independent	Gujarathi Ghanshyamdas Vallabhdas	3,957	12.10%	New
Margin of victory		12,236	37.40%	
Turnout		32,713	52.83%	
Total valid votes		32,713		
Registered electors		61,916		
INC win (new seat)				
