= 1952 Bombay State Legislative Assembly election =

Election in Bombay, India

1952 Bombay Legislative Assembly election
- 26 March 1952

All 315 seats in the Bombay Legislative Assembly 158 seats needed for a majority
- Registered: 16,712,606
- Turnout: 50.78%
	Majority party	Minority party
	INC	PWPI
Party	INC	PWPI
Seats won	269	14
Popular vote	49.95%	6.45%
CM before election
B. G. Kher
INC
Elected CM
Morarji Desai
INC

Indian administrative divisions, as of 1951

Elections to the Legislative Assembly of the Indian state of Bombay were held on 26 March 1952. 1239 candidates contested for the 268 constituencies in the Assembly. There were 1 three-member, 47 two-member constituencies and 220 single-member constituencies.

== Results ==
List of political parties participating in the 1952 Bombay assembly elections

Party	Abbreviation
National parties
Akhil Bharatiya Hindu Mahasabha	HMS
Akhil Bharatiya Jana Sangh	BJS
Akhil Bharatiya Ram Rajya Parishad	RRP
Indian National Congress	INC
Socialist Party	SP
Krishikar Lok Party	KLP
Kisan Mazdoor Praja Party	KMPP
Communist Party of India	CPI
Forward Bloc	FB
All India Scheduled Castes Federation	SCF
State parties
Peasants and Workers Party	PWP
Kamgar Kisan Paksha	KKP

Summary of results of the 1952 Bombay Legislative Assembly election
Political party	Flag	Seats contested	Won	Votes	Vote %
Indian National Congress 270 / 315 (86%)		313	270	55,56,334	49.95%
Peasants and Workers Party of India 14 / 315 (4%)		87	14	7,17,963	6.45%
Socialist Party 9 / 315 (3%)		182	9	13,30,246	11.96%
Kamgar Kisan Paksha 2 / 315 (0.6%)		33	2	2,48,130	2.23%
Scheduled Castes Federation 1 / 315 (0.3%)		37	1	3,44,718	3.10%
Communist Party of India 1 / 315 (0.3%)		25	1	1,59,994	1.44%
Krishikar Lok Party 1 / 315 (0.3%)		16	1	1,07,408	0.97%
Kisan Mazdoor Praja Party		67	0	5,59,492	5.03%
Akhil Bharatiya Ram Rajya Parishad		37	0	1,24,466	1.12%
Akhil Bharatiya Hindu Mahasabha		9	0	35,194	0.32%
Forward Bloc (Marxist Group)		8	0	16,847	0.15%
Akhil Bharatiya Jana Sangh		2	0	4,876	0.04%
Independent 19 / 315 (6%)		427	19	19,17,574	17.24%
Total		1243	317	Turnout (voters) 1,11,23,242 (2,19,04,595)	50.78%

== Elected members ==
District	Constituency		Winner				Runner Up				Margin
District	#	Name	Candidate	Party	Votes	%	Candidate	Party	Votes	%	Margin
Banaskantha	1	Palanpur Abu Vadgam Danta	Galba Chodhary	INC	28,355	39.23	Kuberji Dabhi	SP	7,373	10.20	18,842
Banaskantha	2	Palanpur Abu Vadgam Danta	Gama Vasia	INC	26,215	36.27	Kuberji Dabhi	SP	7,373	10.20	18,842
Banaskantha	3	Palanpur Deesa	Yusuf Miyanji	INC	18,272	66.54	Popatlal Bhansali	RRP	4,562	16.61	13,710
Banaskantha	4	Deesa Dhanera	Popatlal Joshi	IND	9,565	50.50	Kaniayalal Bhansali	IND	8,144	43.00	1,421
Banaskantha	5	Deodar Kankrej Wav Tharad	Shantilal Shah	INC	20,549	35.87	Devraj Vania	IND	5,687	9.93	13,055
Banaskantha	6	Deodar Kankrej Wav Tharad	Joita Solanki	INC	18,742	32.71	Devraj Vania	IND	5,687	9.93	13,055
Amreli	7	Amreeli Damnagar	Jivraj Mehta	INC	10,394	42.52	Harilal Mehta	IND	7,991	32.69	2,403
Amreli	8	Ghogho Kodinar	Bhagvan Barod	INC	14,268	78.06	Visaman Mermka	SP	3,606	19.73	10,662
Amreli	9	Okhamandal Dhari Khambha	Mohanlal Senjalia	INC	9,819	55.36	Jayantilal Thakar	HMS	6,402	36.10	3,417
Mehsana	10	Kadi	Purshottamdas Patel	IND	18,050	50.63	Ambalal Patel	INC	17,601	49.37	449
Mehsana	11	Vijapur South	Mansingh Patel	INC	18,684	61.69	Shantilal Patel	IND	8,627	28.49	10,057
Mehsana	12	Vijapur North	Kacharabhai Patel	INC	13,658	48.33	Shankarbhai Patel	IND	4,617	16.34	9,041
Mehsana	13	Mehsana South	Keshavlal Patel	INC	17,139	57.53	Maganbhai Patel	IND	7,622	25.59	9,517
Mehsana	14	Kalol	Bhagwandas Sheth	INC	13,411	40.75	Shankarji Solanki	IND	12,150	36.91	1,261
Mehsana	15	Mahsana North Patan	Hargovan Patel	INC	14,691	52.97	Pashabhai Patel	IND	7,888	28.44	6,803
Banaskantha	16	Santalpur Radhanpur Sami	Maneklal Vakharia	INC	18,297	70.27	Hiralal Khejda	IND	7,741	29.73	10,556
Mehsana	17	East Sidhapur	Mafatlal Patel	INC	20,554	62.31	Durgaprasad Shukla	RRP	12,431	37.69	8,123
Mehsana	18	Kheralu	Shankarji Thakore	INC	12,515	39.02	Mohanbhai Desai	IND	7,799	24.32	4,716
Mehsana	19	West Sidhpur East Patan	Dayalji Patel	INC	17,058	49.29	Paratapbhai Brahamabhatt	IND	10,376	29.98	6,682
Mehsana	20	Chanasma Harij Patan	Ramdas Kilachand	IND	49,931	41.23	Raghavji Leuva	INC	21,656	17.88	10,663
Mehsana	21	Chanasma Harij Patan	Khemchandbhai Chavda	IND	32,319	26.69	Raghavji Leuva	INC	21,656	17.88	10,663
Mehsana	22	Visnagar	Shivabhai Patel	INC	17,962	62.23	Shivaram Patel	IND	10,904	37.77	7,058
Sabarkantha	23	Idar	Daljitsinhji Maharajkumar	IND	14,321	46.63	Laxmishankar Joshi	SP	1,770	5.76	11,426
Sabarkantha	24	Idar	Madhubhai Patel	INC	13,196	42.96	Laxmishankar Joshi	SP	1,770	5.76	11,426
Sabarkantha	25	Prantij Bayad Malpur	Gopaldas Patel	INC	31,041	56.51	Ratilal Shah	IND	23,888	43.49	7,153
Sabarkantha	26	Prantij Bayad Malpur	Parshottam Solanki	INC	Unopposed	–	Ratilal Shah	IND	23,888	43.49	7,153
Sabarkantha	27	Modasa Meghraj	Ramanlal Soni	INC	20,611	63.30	Bhogilal Shah	IND	10,212	31.36	10,399
Sabarkantha	28	Himatnagar	Khemji Garasia	INC	28,625	34.33	Mansinhghji Maharaj	IND	23,028	27.62	2,169
Sabarkantha	29	Himatnagar	Gangaram Shukla	INC	25,197	30.22	Mansinhghji Maharaj	IND	23,028	27.62	2,169
Ahmedabad	30	Dehgam	Jivanbhai Khodidas	INC	16,486	50.77	Manibhai Chaturbhai	IND	13,835	42.60	2,651
Ahmedabad	31	Ahmedabad City No I	Vrajlal Mehta	INC	15,844	46.97	Jayantilal Thakore	SP	11,745	34.82	4,099
Ahmedabad	32	Ahmedabad City No II	Jaykrishna Patel	INC	20,350	58.58	Ballubhai Krishnalal	SP	12,864	37.03	7,486
Ahmedabad	33	Ahmedabad City No III	Indumati Chimanlal	INC	18,368	68.06	Dinkar Mehta	CPI	4,793	17.76	13,575
Ahmedabad	34	Ahmedabad City No IV	Mohmad Chiapa	INC	16,739	57.86	Dhanjibhai Patel	IND	11,300	39.06	5,439
Ahmedabad	35	Ahmedabad City No V	Shamprasad Vasavda	INC	17,364	58.95	Natvarlal Shah	SP	5,469	18.57	11,895
Ahmedabad	36	Ahmedabad City Nos VI and VII	Somnath Dave	INC	29,062	33.31	V. Permar	SCF	13,217	15.15	12,919
Ahmedabad	37	Ahmedabad City Nos VI and VII	Keshavji Vaghela	INC	26,136	29.96	V. Permar	SCF	13,217	15.15	12,919
Ahmedabad	38	Ahmedabad City No VIII	Madanmohan Mangaldas	INC	18,092	66.72	Thakorlal Thakore	IND	7,412	27.33	10,680
Ahmedabad	39	Dhanduka	Gulamrasul Kureshi	INC	20,068	62.36	Duwarkadas Amratlal	IND	12,114	37.64	7,954
Ahmedabad	40	Sanand	Shantilal Trikamlal	INC	14,445	58.67	Ambalal Patel	KLP	10,174	41.33	4,271
Ahmedabad	41	Viramgam	Maganbhai Patel	INC	13,842	48.11	Parmanand Hiralal	RRP	7,629	26.52	6,213
Ahmedabad	42	Dholka	Maneklal Shah	INC	18,077	56.86	Natwarlal Shah	IND	13,713	43.14	4,364
Ahmedabad	43	Daskroi	Chhotalal Jivabhai	INC	12,946	53.46	Chhotalal Patel	KLP	11,272	46.54	1,674
Ahmedabad	44	Ahmedabad City Taluka	Bhavanishankar Mehta	INC	13,748	50.39	Sorabji Kharsedji	KLP	5,705	20.91	8,043
Kaira	45	Nadiad South	Babubhai Patel	INC	28,781	69.99	Vrajkishorbhai Desai	KMPP	10,743	26.12	18,038
Kaira	46	Nadiad North	Udesinh Vadodia	INC	13,236	47.12	Shivsang Thakor	IND	6,272	22.33	6,964
Kaira	47	Matar Cambay	Madhavlal Shah	INC	35,809	27.52	Jayantilal Vakharia	KMPP	27,075	20.81	3,223
Kaira	48	Matar Cambay	Alabhai Vankar	INC	30,298	23.29	Jayantilal Vakharia	KMPP	27,075	20.81	3,223
Kaira	49	Mehmedabad	Maneklal Modi	INC	17,889	52.04	Ramanlal Patel	KMPP	16,486	47.96	1,403
Kaira	50	Bala Sinor Kapadvanj	Chaturbhai Chauhan	INC	17,583	75.60	Natvarlal Modi	SP	5,674	24.40	11,909
Kaira	51	Kapadvanj	Sankarlal Shah	INC	17,055	49.00	Juvansinh Thakor	KMPP	14,440	41.49	2,615
Kaira	52	Anand North	Natvarsinhji Solanki	INC	23,436	59.11	Bhailalbhai Patel	KMPP	16,213	40.89	7,223
Kaira	53	Anand North	Shanubhai Patel	INC	20,813	60.62	Maganbhai Patel	KMPP	8,640	25.16	12,173
Kaira	54	Borsad No I	Shivabhai Patel	INC	15,001	46.67	Khodabhai Parmar	IND	10,528	32.75	4,473
Kaira	55	Borsad No II	Ishwarbhai Chavda	INC	14,617	44.57	Fulabhai Baria	IND	9,637	29.38	4,980
Kaira	56	Petlad North	Bhaskar Patel	INC	14,158	41.97	Hamirbhai Solanki	SP	10,039	29.76	4,119
Kaira	57	Petlad South	Manilal Parikh	INC	11,203	32.72	Amratlal Parikh	KMPP	10,621	31.02	582
Kaira	58	Thasra	Fazle Zamindar	INC	14,869	55.51	Dinanath Adhbaryu	RRP	7,982	29.80	6,887
Panch Mahals	59	Lunawada Santrampur	Tersinh Bhabhor	INC	26,093	34.28	Sardar Baria	SP	12,837	16.86	11,974
Panch Mahals	60	Lunawada Santrampur	Jayantilal Patel	INC	24,811	32.60	Sardar Baria	SP	12,837	16.86	11,974
Panch Mahals	61	Dohad (ST)	Jawsing Solanki	INC	15,130	75.10	Hirabhai Baria	SP	5,017	24.90	10,113
Panch Mahals	62	Jhalod (ST)	Lalchand Ninama	INC	12,402	59.64	Virji Munia	SP	8,393	40.36	4,009
Panch Mahals	63	Godhra	Dahyabhai Rajput	IND	11,948	40.49	Manilal Mehta	INC	10,020	33.96	1,928
Panch Mahals	64	Shera-limkheda East Baria	Pratapsing Patel	IND	30,626	66.22	Narasing Chauhan	INC	15,621	33.78	15,005
Panch Mahals	65	Shera-limkheda East Baria	Virsinghbhai Nisarta	INC	Unopposed	–	Narasing Chauhan	INC	15,621	33.78	15,005
Panch Mahals	66	Kalol	Mohanbhai Rathod	IND	17,496	51.03	Marutisinh Sisodia	INC	10,731	31.30	6,765
Panch Mahals	67	West Baria	Induben Desai	INC	13,275	60.43	Raijibhai Rathod	RRP	5,511	25.09	7,764
Baroda	68	Baroda City	Chhotabhai Sutaria	INC	12,850	54.07	Sakharam Sudhalkar	KLP	4,731	19.91	8,119
Baroda	69	Baroda Waghodia	Maganbhai Patel	INC	33,023	35.68	Muljibhai Patel	KLP	13,454	14.54	8,103
Baroda	70	Baroda Waghodia	Chhatrasinh Solanki	IND	21,557	23.29	Muljibhai Patel	KLP	13,454	14.54	8,103
Baroda	71	Padra	Jaswantlal Shah	INC	14,075	39.90	Somsinh Jadhav	IND	9,321	26.42	4,754
Baroda	72	Karjan Sinor	Chinubhai Patel	INC	22,500	69.87	Somabhai Patel	KLP	6,268	19.46	16,232
Baroda	73	Dabhoi	Ambalal Shah	INC	17,561	62.45	Bhailal Patel	KLP	8,490	30.19	9,071
Baroda	74	Savil	Manilal Pathak	INC	17,448	63.67	Rambhai Patel	KLP	6,045	22.06	11,403
Baroda	75	Naswadi (ST)	Bhulabhai Tadvi	INC	Unopposed		–				
Baroda	76	Sankheda (ST)	Bhanabhai Tadvi	INC	21,748	81.25	Mela Vasava	IND	5,019	18.75	16,729
Baroda	77	Chho Ta Udepur (ST)	Bhaijibhai Tadvi	INC	Unopposed		–				
Broach	78	Jambusar	Chhotubhai Patel	INC	12,271	39.23	Amarsinhji Thakoresaheb	IND	9,353	29.90	2,918
Broach	79	Broach	Dinkarrao Desai	INC	12,711	39.13	Haji Bharucha	IND	8,526	26.25	4,185
Broach	80	Vagar Amod	Ibrahim Patel	INC	9,530	32.87	Sanatkumar Mehta	SP	6,354	21.91	3,176
Broach	81	Ankleshwar Hansot Jaghadia Valia	Harisinhji Bhagubhai	INC	22,133	23.20	Thakorbhai Shah	IND	14,926	15.65	4,096
Broach	82	Ankleshwar Hansot Jaghadia Valia	Mohan Narsi	INC	19,022	19.94	Thakorbhai Shah	IND	14,926	15.65	4,096
Broach	83	Nandod Dadiapada Sagbara	Bucher Dalpat	INC	15,437	65.11	Dungarji Devna	IND	8,271	34.89	7,166
Surat	84	Surat City East	Gordhandas Chokhawala	INC	21,799	60.30	Kumudben Desai	SP	1,856	5.13	9,186
Surat	85	Surat City East	Ranchhodas Popawala	IND	11,042	30.55	Kumudben Desai	SP	1,856	5.13	9,186
Surat	86	Surat City West	Mohmad Golandaz	INC	14,496	60.77	Lalitmohan Gandhi	SP	6,100	25.57	8,396
Surat	87	Chorasi	Kalyanji Mehta	INC	17,249	52.78	Babubhai Patel	IND	7,013	21.46	10,236
Surat	88	Navsari	Lallubhai Patel	INC	44,275	37.48	Khandaubhai Desai	KMPP	12,041	10.19	29,163
Surat	89	Navsari	Naranbhai Rathod	INC	41,204	34.88	Khandaubhai Desai	KMPP	12,041	10.19	29,163
Surat	90	Gandevi	Kikubhai Naik	INC	16,532	49.65	Rambhai Patel	SP	11,770	35.35	4,762
Surat	91	Bulsar Chikhli	Amul Desai	SP	30,884	21.38	Bhulabhai Patel	INC	29,103	20.15	1,762
Surat	92	Bulsar Chikhli	Moraji Desai	INC	30,865	21.37	Bhulabhai Patel	INC	29,103	20.15	1,762
Surat	93	Pardi	Rewla Patel	SP	14,415	43.19	Sushilchandra Joshi	INC	9,712	29.10	4,703
Surat	94	Dharampur (ST)	Bhika Atara	INC	10,102	41.00	Balubhai Jadhav	SP	8,659	35.14	1,443
Surat	95	Bardoli Valod Palasana Mahuva	Khushalbhai Dhodia	INC	39,742	31.97	Khushalbhai Patel	KMPP	12,345	9.93	26,958
Surat	96	Bardoli Valod Palasana Mahuva	Makanji Patel	INC	39,303	31.62	Khushalbhai Patel	KMPP	12,345	9.93	26,958
Surat	97	Songadh North Vyara (ST)	Vanmali Chaudhuri	INC	14,561	57.83	Chhanbhai Gamit	SP	5,134	20.39	9,427
Surat	98	Bansda South Vyara (ST)	Madhubhai Patel	INC	18,858	54.59	Chimanbhai Patel	SP	11,091	32.10	7,767
Surat	99	Olpad Mangrol Mandvi Kamrej	Chhotubl Patel	INC	42,213	30.89	Dattatraya Pangarkar	IND	20,610	15.08	18,077
Surat	100	Olpad Mangrol Mandvi Kamrej	Prabhubhai Patel	INC	38,687	28.31	Dattatraya Pangarkar	IND	20,610	15.08	18,077
Thane	101	Dahanu Umbergaon	Shamrao Patil	INC	20,842	20.56	Lohanu Dhinda	SP	13,976	13.79	5,766
Thane	102	Dahanu Umbergaon	Bhimara Rupji	INC	19,742	19.48	Lohanu Dhinda	SP	13,976	13.79	5,766
Thane	103	Palghar Jawhar	Trimbak Mukne	INC	20,523	21.08	Jayantiben Shroff	INC	18,739	19.25	368
Thane	104	Palghar Jawhar	Maruti Meher	SP	19,107	19.63	Jayantiben Shroff	INC	18,739	19.25	368
Thane	105	Mokhada Wada Shahapur	Ladku Bhoir	IND	15,848	19.06	Sonu Baswant	INC	13,512	16.25	2,336
Thane	106	Mokhada Wada Shahapur	Amrita Pawar	INC	12,958	15.58	Sonu Baswant	INC	13,512	16.25	2,336
Thane	107	Bhiwandi Murbad East Kalyan	Mustafa Fakih	INC	21,268	19.90	Raghunath Gholap	IND	11,776	11.02	7,660
Thane	108	Bhiwandi Murbad East Kalyan	Pandurang Jadhav	INC	19,436	18.18	Raghunath Gholap	IND	11,776	11.02	7,660
Thane	109	Bassein	Sadanand Warty	SP	19,283	50.51	Ganesh Parulekar	INC	18,895	49.49	388
Thane	110	Kalyan West	Kanji Kerson	INC	8,287	39.57	Ganesh Phadke	HMS	4,791	22.87	3,496
Thane	111	Kalyan Central Kalyan Camp	Khanchand Mansukhani	IND	12,879	39.41	Parsaram Tehalramani	INC	8,109	24.81	4,770
Thane	112	Thane	Madhavrao Hegde	INC	14,067	45.48	Dattatraya Tamhane	SP	5,943	19.21	8,124
Bombay Suburban	113	Borivali	Madhav Deshpande	INC	9,253	40.85	Laxmikant Welingkar	SP	8,145	35.96	1,108
Kolaba	114	Panvel Karjat Matheran Khalapur	Manohar Padir	INC	17,284	19.62	Mavji Bangar	PWP	13,185	14.97	3,016
Kolaba	115	Panvel Karjat Matheran Khalapur	Narhar Thosar	INC	16,201	18.39	Mavji Bangar	PWP	13,185	14.97	3,016
Kolaba	116	Alibag	Dattatraya Kunte	INC	18,426	54.67	Narayan Patil	PWP	12,502	37.09	5,924
Kolaba	117	Pen Uran	Ambaji Patil	INC	18,562	57.62	Ganpat Patil	PWP	10,424	32.36	8,138
Kolaba	118	Roha Sudhagad	Maruti Savant	INC	14,440	48.77	Pandurang Sanap	PWP	10,250	34.62	4,190
Kolaba	119	Murud Shrivardhan	Bhaskar Dighe	INC	17,430	62.95	Moreshwar Virkud	PWP	5,976	21.58	11,454
Kolaba	120	Mangaon Mhasla Mahad	Prabhakar Deshmukh	INC	23,980	26.87	Yeshwant Ambedkar	SCF	16,568	18.56	6,243
Kolaba	121	Mangaon Mhasla Mahad	Dattatray Talegaonkar	INC	22,811	25.56	Yeshwant Ambedkar	SCF	16,568	18.56	6,243
Kolaba	122	Poladpur Mahad	Digambar Purohit	SP	13,597	68.63	Pandurang Deshmukh	INC	6,214	31.37	7,383
East Khandesh	123	Chopda	Madhavrao Patil	INC	20,105	54.55	Narhar Patil	IND	15,725	42.67	4,380
East Khandesh	124	Yawal	Vithalrao Patil	INC	23,118	64.71	Vyankatrao Patil	KKP	6,433	18.01	16,685
East Khandesh	125	Raver	Dhanji Bonde	INC	15,755	40.05	Tukaram Patil	KKP	7,066	17.96	8,689
East Khandesh	126	Edlabad	Eknathrao Patil	INC	13,084	49.13	Damodar Deshmukh	SP	4,087	15.35	8,997
East Khandesh	127	Bhusawal Jamner	Nilkanth Sane	INC	30,473	32.74	Motiram Gavande	PWP	9,396	10.09	15,484
East Khandesh	128	Bhusawal Jamner	Keshavrao Vankhade	INC	24,880	26.73	Motiram Gavande	PWP	9,396	10.09	15,484
East Khandesh	129	Pachora	Julalsing Patil	INC	18,541	62.10	Shankar Patil	SP	5,878	19.69	12,663
East Khandesh	130	Jalgaon Mhasawad	Bhagwan Kandare	INC	29,464	27.37	Krishna Narkhede	SP	11,268	10.47	12,269
East Khandesh	131	Jalgaon Mhasawad	Gulam Rasul Bagwan	INC	23,537	21.86	Krishna Narkhede	SP	11,268	10.47	12,269
East Khandesh	132	Erandol	Sitaram Birla	INC	16,377	51.07	Yogarajsing Parihar	IND	10,852	33.84	5,525
East Khandesh	133	Amalner	Namdeo Patil	INC	14,805	47.21	Vishram Chavan	CPI	7,468	23.81	7,337
East Khandesh	134	Parola	Bhagwantrao Deshmukh	INC	19,814	69.41	Balawantrao Pawar	SP	5,169	18.11	14,645
East Khandesh	135	Bhadgaon Chalisgaon	Motiram Suryavanshi	INC	33,116	31.61	Mansing Bhil	SP	14,369	13.72	12,916
East Khandesh	136	Bhadgaon Chalisgaon	Jalamkha Tadvi	INC	27,285	26.04	Mansing Bhil	SP	14,369	13.72	12,916
West Khandesh	137	Dhulia	Sukhdeo More	INC	28,467	23.37	Nathu Parolekar	CPI	18,248	14.98	3,292
West Khandesh	138	Dhulia	Sonuji Vankhedkar	INC	21,540	17.68	Nathu Parolekar	CPI	18,248	14.98	3,292
West Khandesh	139	Shirpur	Gajmal Mali	INC	16,517	59.23	Uttamrao Patil	PWP	6,202	22.24	10,315
West Khandesh	140	Mewasa Taloda Akrani West	Vishram Patil	INC	14,734	15.57	Jaideosing Ranasaheb	IND	14,159	14.97	575
West Khandesh	141	Mewasa Taloda Akrani West	Janardan Valvi	INC	13,585	14.36	Jaideosing Ranasaheb	IND	14,159	14.97	575
West Khandesh	142	East Shahada Sindkheda Nandurbar	Tukaram Gavit	INC	33,225	31.23	Punaji Lalingkar	SCF	14,950	14.05	14,715
West Khandesh	143	East Shahada Sindkheda Nandurbar	Jaising Raul	INC	29,665	27.88	Punaji Lalingkar	SCF	14,950	14.05	14,715
West Khandesh	144	Sindkheda	Narayanrao Patil	INC	16,560	61.16	Raghunath Khaire	SP	6,592	24.35	9,968
West Khandesh	145	Navapur Sakri	Shankarrao Badse	PWP	29,007	26.51	Yaswantrao Desale	INC	19,098	17.46	5,159
West Khandesh	146	Navapur Sakri	Surji Valvi	PWP	24,257	22.17	Yaswantrao Desale	INC	19,098	17.46	5,159
Nasik	147	Nashik Igatpuri	Dattatraya Kale	INC	29,782	14.54	Bhaurao Gaikwad	SCF	18,005	8.79	5,301
Nasik	148	Nashik Igatpuri	Pandurang Murkute	INC	26,563	12.97	Bhaurao Gaikwad	SCF	18,005	8.79	5,301
Nasik	149	Nashik Igatpuri	Bhikha Pawar	INC	23,306	11.38	Bhaurao Gaikwad	SCF	18,005	8.79	5,301
Nasik	150	Sinnar Niphad	Vasant Naik	INC	27,217	23.27	Deoram Wagh	KKP	15,947	13.63	8,901
Nasik	151	Sinnar Niphad	Amritrao Rankhambe	INC	24,848	21.24	Deoram Wagh	KKP	15,947	13.63	8,901
Nasik	152	North Malegaon	Mohd. Sabir	INC	12,925	38.18	Haroon Ansari	SP	10,694	31.59	2,231
Nasik	153	South Malegaon - Nandgao North	Bhausaheb Hiray	INC	24,077	65.66	Kautik Pawar	SP	8,449	23.04	15,628
Nasik	154	Chandor Kalwan Baglan	Madhavrao Jadhav	INC	25,959	20.27	Laxman Gaikwad	SP	13,788	10.76	11,589
Nasik	155	Chandor Kalwan Baglan	Dongar More	INC	25,377	19.81	Laxman Gaikwad	SP	13,788	10.76	11,589
Nasik	156	Dangs Surgan Peiant Dindori	Anant Jadhav	INC	13,053	16.79	Shankarrao Potinde	PWP	8,391	10.79	2,088
Nasik	157	Dangs Surgan Peiant Dindori	Raosaheb Thorat	INC	10,479	13.48	Shankarrao Potinde	PWP	8,391	10.79	2,088
Nasik	158	Yeola Nandgaon	Madhavrao Shinde	INC	20,496	62.65	Shivram Maru	SCF	8,260	25.25	12,236
Ahmednagar	159	Akola Sangamner	Gopal Bhangare	INC	17,924	20.87	Dharma Bhangare	KKP	16,763	19.52	559
Ahmednagar	160	Akola Sangamner	Datta Deshmukh	KKP	17,322	20.17	Dharma Bhangare	KKP	16,763	19.52	559
Ahmednagar	161	Rahuri	Laxamanrao Patil	INC	14,822	59.30	Punjaji Kadu	CPI	6,660	26.64	8,162
Ahmednagar	162	Shrirampur Newasa	Bhaurao Chaugule	INC	13,534	53.21	Sakharam Patil	KKP	7,555	29.71	5,979
Ahmednagar	163	Kopargaon	Jagannath Barhate	INC	16,636	54.85	Shankarrao Kale	KKP	7,236	23.86	9,400
Ahmednagar	164	Shevgaon	Trimbak Bharde	INC	12,787	55.38	Ekanath Bhagwat	CPI	10,303	44.62	2,484
Ahmednagar	165	Ahmednagar	Vital Kute	INC	16,778	56.51	Kashinath Karandikar	SP	5,589	18.83	11,189
Ahmednagar	166	Ahmednagar Taluka-Parner	Bhaskar Auti	CPI	12,570	56.67	Dattatraya Bhagat	INC	9,612	43.33	2,958
Ahmednagar	167	Pathardi	Madhav Nirhali	INC	13,771	56.84	Narayan Avad	CPI	10,458	43.16	3,313
Ahmednagar	168	Shrigonda	Baburao Bharaskar	INC	18,254	23.47	Sakharam Bhingardive	KKP	13,217	16.99	1,416
Ahmednagar	169	Shrigonda	Shivrao Thorat	INC	14,633	18.81	Sakharam Bhingardive	KKP	13,217	16.99	1,416
Poona	170	Poona City North West	Malati Shirole	INC	14,011	47.50	Laxman Pitalalloo	SP	7,910	26.82	6,101
Poona	171	Poona City South East	Popatlal Shah	INC	18,201	61.17	Jagannath Kirad	SP	6,828	22.95	11,373
Poona	172	Poona City South West	Ramchandra Ghorpade	INC	17,875	52.71	Shankar Date	HMS	11,556	34.08	6,319
Poona	173	Poona City Central	Vinayak Sathe	INC	19,584	57.24	Narhar Abyankar	RRP	9,557	27.93	10,027
Poona	174	Haveli Dhond	Martand Magar	INC	27,193	28.56	Jaysing Sasane	SP	13,638	14.32	12,877
Poona	175	Haveli Dhond	Ganpat Kharat	INC	26,515	27.85	Jaysing Sasane	SP	13,638	14.32	12,877
Poona	176	Shirur	Vithal Ghate	INC	7,853	44.36	Yeshwant Jedhe	PWP	6,248	35.30	1,605
Poona	177	Baramati	Gulabrao Mulik	INC	17,973	59.02	Nanashaheb Gagtap	PWP	6,380	20.95	11,593
Poona	178	Ambegaon	Annasaheb Awate	INC	20,053	70.44	Maruti Padwal	PWP	6,044	21.23	14,009
Poona	179	Khed	Pandharinath Kabirbuwa	INC	16,184	74.91	Narayan Mali	SCF	3,997	18.50	12,187
Poona	180	Maval North Mulshi	Veedharval Dabhade	IND	15,407	54.59	Gajanan Gupe	INC	7,288	25.82	8,119
Poona	181	Bhor Velhe South Mulshi	Namdeo Mohol	INC	11,251	50.54	Bhagwant Khopade	PWP	3,832	17.21	7,419
Poona	182	Purandar	Madhaorao Memane	INC	15,836	62.47	Raghunath Raut	SP	4,648	18.33	11,188
Poona	183	Junnar	Dattatraya Dhobale	INC	10,007	38.06	Shivaji Kale	SP	7,363	28.01	2,644
Poona	184	Indapur	Shankarrao Patil	INC	10,127	38.56	Narayan Kulkarni	SP	4,688	17.85	5,439
Sholapur	185	Akalkot-South Sholapur	Madiwallappa Kadadi	INC	26,354	25.62	Jaysinh Bhosale	PWP	23,505	22.85	2,849
Sholapur	186	Akalkot-South Sholapur	Ganpat Sonawane	INC	23,371	22.72	Jaysinh Bhosale	PWP	23,505	22.85	2,849
Sholapur	187	North Sholapur	Raje Bhosale	INC	13,419	44.47	Ambaddas Jadhav	PWP	8,706	28.85	4,713
Sholapur	188	Solapur City North	Shivshakar Dhanshetti	PWP	11,799	52.41	Vyankappa Chanapattan	INC	8,737	38.81	3,062
Sholapur	189	Solapur City South	Govind Sane	PWP	8,396	39.01	Channusing Chandale	INC	7,741	35.97	655
Sholapur	190	Barsi North	Narsing Deshmukh	PWP	15,462	43.84	Mahadeo Supekar	INC	9,849	27.93	5,613
Sholapur	191	Barsi Madha	Tulshidas Jadhav	PWP	26,174	63.46	Ganpat Sathe	INC	15,071	36.54	11,103
Sholapur	192	Madha Mohol	Tawaji Gund	PWP	17,413	58.42	Ganpat Shende	INC	8,419	28.25	8,994
Sholapur	193	Karmala	Namdeo Jagtap	INC	9,143	50.90	Ganpat Patil	PWP	5,290	29.45	3,853
Sholapur	194	Sangola	Keshavrao Raut	INC	10,593	46.16	Sopan Patange	PWP	8,705	37.94	1,888
Sholapur	195	Malshiras	Shankarrao Mohite-Patil	IND	15,076	51.51	Jagannath Girme	INC	6,967	23.80	8,109
Sholapur	196	Pandharpur Mangal Vedha	Jaywant More	IND	32,563	27.64	Baburao Badwe	INC	26,679	22.65	1,030
Sholapur	197	Pandharpur Mangal Vedha	Maruti Kamble	INC	27,709	23.52	Baburao Badwe	INC	26,679	22.65	1,030
Satara North	198	Wai Khandala	Dadasaheb Jagtap	PWP	19,395	50.20	Kisan Veer	INC	17,131	44.34	2,264
Satara North	199	Khatav	Tatya Jadhav	INC	16,532	51.02	Babasaheb Bhosle	IND	10,812	33.37	5,720
Satara North	200	Koregaon	Shankarrao Gharge	INC	9,112	30.71	Pandurang Borate	SP	4,536	15.29	4,576
Satara North	201	East Satara	Vithal Patil	KKP	9,128	33.87	Ismail Hakim	IND	5,022	18.63	4,106
Satara North	202	West Satara	Baburao Ghorpade	INC	5,414	23.41	Rajaram Dhane	KKP	4,123	17.83	1,291
Satara North	203	Phaltan Man	Malojirao Naik Nimbalkar	INC	31,633	35.00	Krishna Nalavade	KKP	11,864	13.13	15,023
Satara North	204	Phaltan Man	Ganpatrao Tapase	INC	26,887	29.75	Krishna Nalavade	KKP	11,864	13.13	15,023
Satara North	205	Javali Mahbaleshwar	Babasaheb Shinde	INC	10,734	47.19	Krishnarao Tarade	PWP	4,706	20.69	6,028
Satara South	206	Patan	Daulatrao Desai	INC	17,757	50.14	Dajisaheb Chavan	PWP	17,658	49.86	99
Satara South	207	Karad North	Yashwantrao Chavan	INC	15,773	50.33	Keshavrao Pawar	PWP	15,565	49.67	208
Satara South	208	Karad South	Yashwantrao Mohite	PWP	13,520	40.05	Sambhajirao Thorat	INC	11,724	34.73	1,796
Satara South	209	Sangli	Vasantrao Patil	INC	24,579	70.95	Anna Devarshi	SP	7,559	21.82	17,020
Satara South	210	Miraj	Shrimatibai Kalantre	INC	20,276	58.05	Dhondiram Mali	SP	6,229	17.83	14,047
Satara South	211	Kavathe Mahankal (Miraj) - Tasgaon (East)	Gundu Patil	INC	18,963	64.23	Baburao Shendage	SP	4,469	15.14	14,494
Satara South	212	Tasgaon West	Dattajirao Suryawanshi	INC	20,105	55.42	Ganpati Lad	PWP	7,880	21.72	12,225
Satara South	213	Islampur	Sadashiv Patil	INC	16,108	47.16	Nagnath Naikwadi	KKP	9,403	27.53	6,705
Satara South	214	Khanapur	Dattajirao Deshmukh	INC	34,268	32.33	Bhagwan More	IND	21,367	20.16	7,172
Satara South	215	Khanapur	Laxman Bhingardeve	INC	28,539	26.92	Bhagwan More	IND	21,367	20.16	7,172
Satara South	216	Jat	Vijaysinhrao Dafale	IND	24,021	71.27	Girmallapapa Mogali	INC	6,314	18.73	17,707
Satara South	217	Shirala Walva	Sarojini Babar	INC	11,066	36.42	Yeshwant Patil	PWP	9,727	32.01	1,339
Kolhapur	218	Shahuwadi	Rangrao Patil	PWP	7,560	31.18	Rangarao Chougule	INC	5,728	23.62	1,832
Kolhapur	219	Panhala Bawda	Atmaram Sawant	PWP	6,158	30.81	Dnyanu Sasane	INC	5,077	25.40	1,081
Kolhapur	220	Radhanagari	Dnyandev Khandekar	PWP	12,451	40.90	Balasaheb Patil	INC	7,839	25.75	4,612
Kolhapur	221	Shirol	Rajaram Bagade	INC	20,883	55.25	Jinnappa Managave	SP	8,067	21.34	12,816
Kolhapur	222	Hatkanangale	Babasaheb Khanjire	INC	28,519	22.69	Dadasaheb Shirke	SCF	14,070	11.20	14,425
Kolhapur	223	Hatkanangale	Dattatraya Powar	INC	28,495	22.68	Dadasaheb Shirke	SCF	14,070	11.20	14,425
Kolhapur	224	Karvir	Narayan Sarnaik	IND	7,004	32.03	Ganpatrao Indulkar	INC	4,801	21.95	2,203
Kolhapur	225	Kolhapur City	Balvant Baralay	PWP	10,909	34.91	Ganpatrao Jadhav	INC	8,923	28.55	1,986
Kolhapur	226	Bhudargad Ajra	Vishwanath Patil	INC	10,359	33.08	Amrit Desai	PWP	8,383	26.77	1,976
Kolhapur	227	Gadhinglaj	Mahadeo Shreshti	INC	18,419	46.09	Rakhamajirao Desai	IND	10,733	26.86	7,686
Kolhapur	228	Kagal	Malharrao Desai	IND	16,443	48.21	Daulatrao Nikam	INC	10,354	30.36	6,089
Ratnagiri	229	Savantwadi	Prataprao Bhonsle	INC	12,058	51.80	Anand Chavan	SP	3,177	13.65	8,881
Ratnagiri	230	Mandangad Dapoli	Shantaram Peje	INC	9,764	45.63	Mohmad Parkar	SP	4,714	22.03	5,050
Ratnagiri	231	Dapoli Khed	Wajuddin Parkar	INC	8,004	33.34	Jagannath Patne	SCF	4,867	20.27	3,137
Ratnagiri	232	Chiplun Khed	Sudkoji Khedekar	INC	17,022	23.60	Amrit Bhosale	IND	13,194	18.29	3,688
Ratnagiri	233	Chiplun Khed	Tukaram Shetye	INC	16,882	23.40	Amrit Bhosale	IND	13,194	18.29	3,688
Ratnagiri	234	Guhagar	Mahadeo Pawar	INC	6,296	34.93	Yeshwant Vilankar	IND	3,781	20.98	2,515
Ratnagiri	235	Sangameshwar	Ramdas Shirke	INC	13,535	52.75	Arjun Vichare	SP	5,495	21.42	8,040
Ratnagiri	236	Ratnagiri	Sitaram Surwe	INC	10,699	50.86	Jairam Shetye	SP	5,512	26.20	5,187
Ratnagiri	237	Lanja	Vithal Kalambate	INC	7,831	39.32	Shashishekhar Athiye	SP	6,288	31.58	1,543
Ratnagiri	238	Rajapur	Sitaram Subhedar	INC	7,618	41.06	Gopal Narkar	SP	4,261	22.96	3,357
Ratnagiri	239	Deogad	Waman Rane	INC	7,193	40.61	Dattatray Kode	IND	6,751	38.11	442
Ratnagiri	240	Kankavli	Keshav Rane	INC	7,246	38.08	Shankar Gholkar	SP	5,004	26.30	2,242
Ratnagiri	241	Malvan	Shripad Mahajan	INC	7,796	38.34	Shridhar Manjarekar	IND	6,041	29.71	1,755
Ratnagiri	242	Vengurla	Parsharam Sawant	INC	10,608	38.88	Madhukar Varadkar	SP	7,080	25.95	3,528
Ratnagiri	243	Kudal	Jagnnath Dhond	INC	7,629	35.87	Pundlik Kinalekar	SP	6,651	31.27	978
Bombay City	244	Colaba Fort	Nathalal Parikh	INC	12,236	47.62	Sharookh Sabawala	SP	9,077	35.33	3,159
Bombay City	245	Boribunder Marine Lines	Kailas Narola	INC	13,670	50.98	Gunottam Hutheesing	SP	10,194	38.02	3,476
Bombay City	246	Chakla Mandvi Chinch Bunder	Abdul Salebhai	INC	16,485	72.11	Sale Tayabani	SP	5,573	24.38	10,912
Bombay City	247	Umarkhadi Dongri Wadi Bunder	Bhawanishankar Divgi	INC	13,712	49.45	Moinuddin Harris	SP	13,166	47.48	546
Bombay City	248	Kharatalao Kumbharwada	Ishakbhai Bandukwala	INC	19,306	69.56	Hooseini Salebhoy	SP	6,947	25.03	12,359
Bombay City	249	Bhuleshwar Market	Kodardas Shah	INC	21,046	68.56	Vimla Mehta	SP	4,060	13.23	16,986
Bombay City	250	Chira Bazar Thakurdwar Fanaswadi	Bhanushankar Yagnik	INC	17,812	53.48	Yeshwant Samant	SP	9,336	28.03	8,476
Bombay City	251	Girgaum Khetwadi	Lilavati Banker	INC	14,410	48.39	Sushil Kavlekar	SP	8,191	27.51	6,219
Bombay City	252	Chaupati Grant Road Tardeo	Naushir Bharucha	SP	13,798	45.18	Kashibai Sathe	INC	13,027	42.65	771
Bombay City	253	Walkeshwar Mahalaxmi	Homi Taleyarkhan	INC	9,664	36.41	Rohit Dave	SP	6,306	23.76	3,358
Bombay City	254	Agripada Madanpura Foras Road Chunna Bhatti	Taher Mohamed	INC	12,276	50.08	Adam Shaikh	SP	8,750	35.70	3,526
Bombay City	255	Kamathipura Nagpada	Vishwanathrao Tulla	INC	12,321	49.37	Akbar Peerbhoy	SP	8,456	33.88	3,865
Bombay City	256	Mazgaon Ghodapdeo	Mafaldo Mascarenhas	INC	12,891	50.51	Placid Dmello	SP	8,932	34.99	3,959
Bombay City	257	Tank Pakhadi Byculla West Kalachowki West	Sayaji Silam	INC	14,714	48.48	Damodar Mahajani	SP	8,103	26.70	6,611
Bombay City	258	Sewri Kalachowki-Naigam Vadala	Madhav Mane	SP	23,596	23.03	Dattatraya Damle	INC	21,272	20.76	2,324
Bombay City	259	Sewri Kalachowki-Naigam Vadala	Sitaram Shivtarkar	INC	19,890	19.41	Dattatraya Damle	INC	21,272	20.76	2,324
Bombay City	260	Lalbaug Parel	Madhav Desai	INC	11,756	38.83	Moreshwar Donde	SP	8,203	27.09	3,553
Bombay City	261	Chinchpokli Lower Parel Love Grove	Bhagirath Jha	SP	23,503	24.71	Narsinh Mahajn	INC	17,910	18.83	2,640
Bombay City	262	Chinchpokli Lower Parel Love Grove	Bapu Kamble	SCF	20,550	21.61	Narsinh Mahajn	INC	17,910	18.83	2,640
Bombay City	263	Worli Prabhadevi	Madhav Birje	INC	8,434	30.08	Peter Alvares	SP	7,029	25.07	1,405
Bombay City	264	Dadar Saitanchowky	Trimbak Naravne	INC	15,058	45.11	Pralhad Atre	SP	13,248	39.69	1,810
Bombay City	265	Matunga Sion Koliwada	Subramaniam Salivati	INC	14,588	46.87	U. U. Bhat	SP	8,880	28.53	5,708
Bombay City	266	Mahim Dharavi	Abdul Latif	INC	13,326	43.21	Frederick Pinto	SP	11,737	38.06	1,589
Bombay Suburban	267	Kurla Bandra East	Indravadan Oza	INC	13,366	45.53	Rajabhau Kulkarni	SP	11,048	37.63	2,318
Bombay Suburban	268	Bandra Khar Juhu	Dattatraya Wandrekar	INC	13,062	44.67	Kashibal Awsare	SP	11,305	38.66	1,757
Bombay Suburban	269	Vile Parle Andheri Versova	Shantilal Shah	INC	12,373	44.88	Abdusatar Parekh	SP	7,606	27.59	4,767
Bombay Suburban	270	Chembur-Ghatkopar and Villages and Sion North	Ratilal Mehta	INC	14,804	50.75	Ramchand Bulchandani	SP	7,698	26.39	7,106
Belgaum	271	Chandgad	Vithal Patil	PWP	22,125	62.51	Venkat Desai	INC	13,272	37.49	8,853
Belgaum	272	Khanapur	Basappa Aragavi	INC	18,264	44.81	Laxman Birje	PWP	16,856	41.36	1,408
Belgaum	273	Bailhongal	Holibasappa Metgud	INC	23,816	60.66	Shanmukhappa Angadi	KMPP	15,447	39.34	8,369
Belgaum	274	Athani	Narasgauda Patil	INC	16,719	68.89	Anantrao Kulkarni	IND	3,362	13.85	13,357
Belgaum	275	Athani Chikodi	Padmappa Gunjal	INC	15,577	50.82	Dhairyashilrao Powar Desai	IND	7,110	23.20	8,467
Belgaum	276	Chikodi Raibagh	Vasanthrao Patil	IND	16,410	56.48	Ningappa Dalavai	INC	12,647	43.52	3,763
Belgaum	277	Chikodi	Shankar Kothavale	INC	37,217	27.74	Appasaheb Desai	IND	26,125	19.48	6,348
Belgaum	278	Chikodi	Radhabai Shreyakar	INC	32,473	24.21	Appasaheb Desai	IND	26,125	19.48	6,348
Belgaum	279	Gokak	Appana Panchagavi	INC	22,316	71.17	Basawantappa Mamdapur	KMPP	9,042	28.83	13,274
Belgaum	280	Konnur	Khadirsab Shaikh	INC	22,200	67.95	Padmavati Angadi	KMPP	5,926	18.14	16,274
Belgaum	281	Parasgad	Hemappa Kaujalgi	INC	21,599	55.52	Rayangouda Patil	KMPP	17,303	44.48	4,296
Belgaum	282	Belgaum Urban	Bhujang Dalvi	IND	14,732	45.16	Bhimaji Potdar	INC	11,812	36.21	2,920
Belgaum	283	Belgaum Rural	Sadashiv Bhosle	INC	19,138	49.04	Govindrao Desai	PWP	12,809	32.82	6,329
Belgaum	284	Hukeri	Malgouda Patil	INC	24,568	69.22	Kalagouda Patil	KMPP	8,990	25.33	15,578
Belgaum	285	Ramdurg	Hanamanta Mumbaraddi	INC	19,078	65.50	Lingangouda Patil	KMPP	10,049	34.50	9,029
North Kanara	286	Haliyal Yellapur Supa	Ramchandra Kamat	INC	13,372	50.87	Virupakshappa Gadhi	SWP	6,847	26.05	6,525
North Kanara	287	Ankola Karwar	Balso Kadam	SWP	9,454	34.21	Sannappa Gaonkar	INC	7,364	26.65	2,090
North Kanara	288	Kumta Honavar	Ramkrishna Naik	INC	15,079	44.99	Narayan Naik	SWP	11,095	33.10	3,984
North Kanara	289	Honnavar	Ramkrishna Kamat	INC	10,888	35.61	Devendra Naik	SP	8,770	28.68	2,118
North Kanara	290	Siddapur Sirsi Mundgod	Timmappa Hegde	INC	25,535	77.42	Venkojirao Chaudhri	SWP	7,446	22.58	18,089
Bijapur	291	Indi Sindgi	Mallappa Surpur	INC	30,322	36.56	Babu Hujare	SCF	5,457	6.58	24,774
Bijapur	292	Indi Sindgi	Jattappa Kabadi	INC	30,231	36.45	Babu Hujare	SCF	5,457	6.58	24,774
Bijapur	293	Hippargi Bagewadi	Shankargouda Patil	INC	17,752	76.32	Savaligeppa Nandi	KMPP	5,507	23.68	12,245
Bijapur	294	Bijapur	Mallangauda Patil	INC	10,406	38.24	Balsing Muktumsa	CPI	6,069	22.30	4,337
Bijapur	295	Managoli Bableswar	Shivapgauda Patil	INC	19,437	73.23	Basappa Payannavar	KMPP	6,007	22.63	13,430
Bijapur	296	Tikota Bilgi	Chanbasappa Ambli	INC	21,042	62.61	Rayongouda Patil	KMPP	9,001	26.78	12,041
Bijapur	297	Muddebihal	Pranesh Sidhanti	INC	16,627	65.16	Bhimangouda Patil	KMPP	7,745	30.35	8,882
Bijapur	298	Jamkhandi	Basappa Jatti	INC	24,020	62.88	Mahadevappa Murgod	IND	6,618	17.32	17,402
Bijapur	299	Mudhol	Hiralal Shah	INC	19,340	70.96	Krishnappa Nadgouda	KMPP	3,606	13.23	15,734
Bijapur	300	Bagalkot	Basappa Muranal	INC	24,927	78.52	Gurasiddappa Desai	KMPP	6,819	21.48	18,108
Bijapur	301	Badami	Venkanagouda Patil	INC	19,186	65.12	Shankarappagouda Desai	KMPP	10,276	34.88	8,910
Bijapur	302	Guledgud Kamatgi	Madivalappa Pattanshetti	INC	22,571	71.05	Gadagaya Nanjjayyanamath	KMPP	9,199	28.95	13,372
Bijapur	303	Hungund	Shivlingappaa Kanthi	INC	23,128	72.33	Shankargauda Desai	KMPP	6,115	19.12	17,013
Dharwar	304	Dharwar	Hasansab Dasanakop	INC	15,210	51.93	Basawaraj Desai	KMPP	13,068	44.61	2,142
Dharwar	305	Dharwar Kalghatgi	Basawannappa Tambakad	INC	15,010	57.08	Basanagauda Patil	KMPP	7,663	29.14	7,347
Dharwar	306	Hubli	Kalmeshwar Dundur	INC	23,962	24.66	Veeranagauda Marigaudar	KMPP	18,533	19.07	2,120
Dharwar	307	Hubli	Dharamappa Sambrani	INC	20,653	21.25	Veeranagauda Marigaudar	KMPP	18,533	19.07	2,120
Dharwar	308	Naval Gund Nar Gund	Adiveppagouda Patil	INC	25,576	70.27	Girmallappa Nalawadi	KMPP	10,822	29.73	14,754
Dharwar	309	Ron	Andanappa Doddameti	INC	25,585	70.34	Veerangauda Patil	IND	10,789	29.66	14,796
Dharwar	310	Gadag	Kuberappa Gadag	INC	18,813	60.25	Kashappagouda Patil	IND	12,412	39.75	6,401
Dharwar	311	Gadag Mundargi	Chanabasappa Hulkoti	INC	19,270	62.59	Fakirgouda Patil	KMPP	9,152	29.72	10,118
Dharwar	312	Shirahatti	Venkatesh Magadi	INC	19,604	53.48	Shivilingappa Salimath	KMPP	9,613	26.22	9,991
Dharwar	313	Shiggaon	Mallappa Hurali Koppi	INC	17,302	64.54	Gadigeppagouda Patil	KMPP	6,831	25.48	10,471
Dharwar	314	Haveri	Gudleppa Hallikeri	INC	19,879	50.38	Gurushantappa Magavi	IND	19,578	49.62	301
Dharwar	315	Ranebennur	Kallanagouda Patil	INC	26,946	70.28	Hanmantrao Kulkarni	KMPP	9,986	26.04	16,960
Dharwar	316	Hirekerur	Veeranagouda Patil	INC	18,323	53.33	Basalengappagouda Patil	KMPP	13,893	40.44	4,430
Dharwar	317	Hangal	Siddappa Sindhur	INC	24,019	73.43	Basanagouda Patil	KMPP	8,693	26.57	15,326

== State reorganization ==
On 1 November 1956, under States Reorganisation Act, 1956, Bombay state was enlarged by the addition of Saurashtra state and Kutch state, the Marathi-speaking districts of Nagpur Division of Madhya Pradesh, and the Marathi speaking Marathwada region of Hyderabad. The state's southernmost Kannada-speaking districts of Dharwar, Bijapur, North Kanara and Belgaum (excluding the Chandgad taluk) were transferred to Mysore state, while Abu Road taluk of the Banaskantha district was transferred to Rajasthan. Hence the constituencies increased from 315 to 396 in 1957 elections.

== See also ==
- Bombay State
- 1951–52 elections in India
- 1957 Bombay Legislative Assembly election
