= Javali Mahbaleshwar Assembly constituency =

Constituency of the Maharashtra legislative assembly in India

Javali Mahbaleshwar
- Former constituency for the Maharashtra Legislative Assembly

Constituency details
- Country: India
- Region: Western India
- State: Maharashtra
- Established: 1951
- Abolished: 1955
- Total electors: 34,405
- Reservation: None

Javali Mahbaleshwar Assembly constituency was an assembly constituency in the India state of Maharashtra.

== Members of the Legislative Assembly ==
Election	Member	Party
1952	Shinde Babasaheb Jagdeorao	Indian National Congress

== Election results ==
=== Assembly Election 1952 ===
1952 Bombay State Legislative Assembly election : Javali Mahbaleshwar
Party	Candidate	Votes	%	±%
INC	Shinde Babasaheb Jagdeorao	10,734	47.19%	New
PWPI	Tarade Krishnarao Haribhau	4,706	20.69%	New
Independent	More Laxman Krishna	4,519	19.87%	New
Independent	Darekar Eknath Vithoba	2,788	12.26%	New
Margin of victory		6,028	26.50%	
Turnout		22,747	66.12%	
Total valid votes		22,747		
Registered electors		34,405		
INC win (new seat)				
