= Chakla Mandvi Chinch Bunder Assembly constituency =

Constituency of the Maharashtra legislative assembly in India

Chakla Mandvi Chinch Bunder
- Former constituency for the Maharashtra Legislative Assembly

Constituency details
- Country: India
- Region: Western India
- State: Maharashtra
- Established: 1951
- Abolished: 1955
- Total electors: 50,559
- Reservation: None

Chakla Mandvi Chinch Bunder Assembly constituency was an assembly constituency in the India state of Maharashtra.

== Members of the Legislative Assembly ==
Election	Member	Party
1952	Salebhai Abdul Kadar	Indian National Congress

== Election results ==
=== Assembly Election 1952 ===
1952 Bombay State Legislative Assembly election : Chakla Mandvi Chinch Bunder
Party	Candidate	Votes	%	±%
INC	Salebhai Abdul Kadar	16,485	72.11%	New
Socialist	Tayabani Sale Mohmed Tayab	5,573	24.38%	New
KMPP	Maheshwari Padamsi Manekji	802	3.51%	New
Margin of victory		10,912	47.73%	
Turnout		22,860	45.21%	
Total valid votes		22,860		
Registered electors		50,559		
INC win (new seat)				
