= Poona City North West Assembly constituency =

Constituency of the Maharashtra legislative assembly in India

Poona City North West
- Former constituency for the Maharashtra Legislative Assembly

Constituency details
- Country: India
- Region: Western India
- State: Maharashtra
- Established: 1951
- Abolished: 1955
- Total electors: 65,034
- Reservation: None

Poona City North West Assembly constituency was an assembly constituency in the India state of Maharashtra.

== Members of the Legislative Assembly ==
Election	Member	Party
1952	Shirole Malati Madhav	Indian National Congress

== Election results ==
=== Assembly Election 1952 ===
1952 Bombay State Legislative Assembly election : Poona City North West
Party	Candidate	Votes	%	±%
INC	Shirole Malati Madhav	14,011	47.50%	New
Socialist	Pitalalloo Laxman Lingu	7,910	26.82%	New
PWPI	Shirole Bhausaheb Laxman	4,539	15.39%	New
Independent	Nagarkar Pandurang Ramchandra	2,170	7.36%	New
Kamgar Kisan Paksha	Kate Namdeo Laxman	525	1.78%	New
Independent	Chavan Nanasaheb Babasaheb	342	1.16%	New
Margin of victory		6,101	20.68%	
Turnout		29,497	45.36%	
Total valid votes		29,497		
Registered electors		65,034		
INC win (new seat)				
