= Kamathipura Nagpada Assembly constituency =

Constituency of the Maharashtra legislative assembly in India

Kamathipura Nagpada
- Former constituency for the Maharashtra Legislative Assembly

Constituency details
- Country: India
- Region: Western India
- State: Maharashtra
- Established: 1951
- Abolished: 1955
- Total electors: 53,364
- Reservation: None

Kamathipura Nagpada Assembly constituency was an assembly constituency in the India state of Maharashtra.

== Members of the Legislative Assembly ==
| Election | Member | Party |
|---|---|---|
| 1952 | Tulla, Vishwanathrao Rajanna | Indian National Congress |

== Election results ==
=== Assembly Election 1952 ===
1952 Bombay State Legislative Assembly election : Kamathipura Nagpada
| Party | Candidate | Votes | % | ±% |
|---|---|---|---|---|
| INC | Tulla, Vishwanathrao Rajanna | 12,321 | 49.37% | New |
| Socialist | Peerbhoy Akbar Abedin | 8,456 | 33.88% | New |
| Independent | Shaikh, Abdul Majid Mohmad Baksha | 2,828 | 11.33% | New |
| Independent | Shaikh Mohmad Hussein | 938 | 3.76% | New |
| KMPP | Gavli, Rajaram Mallayya | 414 | 1.66% | New |
| Margin of victory | | 3,865 | 15.49% | |
| Turnout | | 24,957 | 46.77% | |
| Total valid votes | | 24,957 | | |
| Registered electors | | 53,364 | | |
| INC win (new seat) | | | | |
