= Chandor Kalwan Baglan Assembly constituency =

Constituency of the Maharashtra legislative assembly in India

Chandor Kalwan Baglan
- Former constituency for the Maharashtra Legislative Assembly

Constituency details
- Country: India
- Region: Western India
- State: Maharashtra
- Established: 1951
- Abolished: 1955
- Total electors: 1,19,764
- Reservation: ST

Chandor Kalwan Baglan Assembly constituency was an assembly constituency in the India state of Maharashtra.

== Members of the Legislative Assembly ==
Election	Member	Party
1952	Jadhav Madhavrao Laxmanrao	Indian National Congress
1952	More Dongar Rama	Indian National Congress

== Election results ==
=== Assembly Election 1952 ===
1952 Bombay State Legislative Assembly election : Chandor Kalwan Baglan
Party	Candidate	Votes	%	±%
INC	Jadhav Madhavrao Laxmanrao	25,959	20.27%	New
INC	More Dongar Rama	25,377	19.81%	New
Socialist	Gaikwad Laxman Arjun	13,788	10.76%	New
Kamgar Kisan Paksha	Sonavane Narayan Mansaram	13,103	10.23%	New
Socialist	Sonawane Daga Ajaba	13,044	10.18%	New
Independent	Bhutekar Gangadhar Bapuji	10,433	8.14%	New
PWPI	Pawar Nagu Ganpat	8,913	6.96%	New
Kamgar Kisan Paksha	Pawar Bala Ramji	8,676	6.77%	New
Independent	Mali Madhav Narayan	4,663	3.64%	New
Independent	Chandratre Pandharinath Balkrishna	4,136	3.23%	New
Margin of victory		12,171	9.50%	
Turnout		128,092	53.48%	
Total valid votes		128,092		
Registered electors		119,764		
INC win (new seat)				
