= Kharatalao Kumbharwada Assembly constituency =

Constituency of the Maharashtra legislative assembly in India

Kharatalao Kumbharwada
- Former constituency for the Maharashtra Legislative Assembly

Constituency details
- Country: India
- Region: Western India
- State: Maharashtra
- Established: 1951
- Abolished: 1955
- Total electors: 52,422
- Reservation: None

Kharatalao Kumbharwada Assembly constituency was an assembly constituency in the India state of Maharashtra.

== Members of the Legislative Assembly ==
Election	Member	Party
1952	Bandukwala Ishakbhai Abbasbhai	Indian National Congress

== Election results ==
=== Assembly Election 1952 ===
1952 Bombay State Legislative Assembly election : Kharatalao Kumbharwada
Party	Candidate	Votes	%	±%
INC	Bandukwala Ishakbhai Abbasbhai	19,306	69.56%	New
Socialist	Hooseini Salebhoy	6,947	25.03%	New
Independent	Damania Jayakishen Hirjivandas	781	2.81%	New
Independent	Parmekar Gangaram Bapu	721	2.60%	New
Margin of victory		12,359	44.53%	
Turnout		27,755	52.95%	
Total valid votes		27,755		
Registered electors		52,422		
INC win (new seat)				
