= Kurla Bandra East Assembly constituency =

Constituency of the Maharashtra legislative assembly in India

Kurla Bandra East
- Former constituency for the Maharashtra Legislative Assembly

Constituency details
- Country: India
- Region: Western India
- State: Maharashtra
- Established: 1951
- Abolished: 1955
- Total electors: 51,441

Kurla Bandra East Assembly constituency was an assembly constituency in the India state of Maharashtra. After the 1955 Delimitation act, it was split into Kurla and Bandra constituencies.

== Members of the Legislative Assembly ==
Election	Member	Party
1952	Oza, Indravadan Manmohanrai	Indian National Congress

== Election results ==
=== Assembly Election 1952 ===
1952 Bombay State Legislative Assembly election : Kurla Bandra East
Party	Candidate	Votes	%	±%
INC	Oza, Indravadan Manmohanrai	13,366	45.53%	New
Socialist	Kulkarni, Rajabhau Gopal	11,048	37.63%	New
Independent	Nalavade, Raghunath Bhaurao	2,025	6.90%	New
Independent	Bhalekar, Shantaram, Tukaram	1,185	4.04%	New
RRP	Koparkar, Gangadhar Narayan	885	3.01%	New
KMPP	Singh, Hanuman Saran	345	1.18%	New
Independent	Gaikwad, Laxman Nathuji	265	0.90%	New
Independent	Pahuja, Dinanath	238	0.81%	New
Margin of victory		2,318	7.90%	
Turnout		29,357	57.07%	
Total valid votes		29,357		
Registered electors		51,441		
INC win (new seat)				
