= Umarkhadi Dongri Wadi Bunder Assembly constituency =

Constituency of the Maharashtra legislative assembly in India

Umarkhadi Dongri Wadi Bunder
- Former constituency for the Maharashtra Legislative Assembly

Constituency details
- Country: India
- Region: Western India
- State: Maharashtra
- Established: 1951
- Abolished: 1955
- Total electors: 52,477
- Reservation: None

Umarkhadi Dongri Wadi Bunder Assembly constituency was an assembly constituency in the India state of Maharashtra.

== Members of the Legislative Assembly ==
Election	Member	Party
1952	Divgi Bhawanishankar Padmanabha	Indian National Congress

== Election results ==
=== Assembly Election 1952 ===
1952 Bombay State Legislative Assembly election : Umarkhadi Dongri Wadi Bunder
Party	Candidate	Votes	%	±%
INC	Divgi Bhawanishankar Padmanabha	13,712	49.45%	New
Socialist	Harris Moinuddin Burhanuddin	13,166	47.48%	New
Independent	Patel Noorali Sakur	850	3.07%	New
Margin of victory		546	1.97%	
Turnout		27,728	52.84%	
Total valid votes		27,728		
Registered electors		52,477		
INC win (new seat)				
