= Bandra Khar Juhu Assembly constituency =

Constituency of the Maharashtra legislative assembly in India

Bandra Khar Juhu
- Former constituency for the Maharashtra Legislative Assembly

Constituency details
- Country: India
- Region: Western India
- State: Maharashtra
- Established: 1952
- Abolished: 1955
- Total electors: 54,403

Bandra Khar Juhu Assembly constituencywas an assembly constituency in the India state of Maharashtra. In 1955 Delimitation Juhu was moved to Parle Andheri Assembly constituency.

== Members of the Legislative Assembly ==
Election	Member	Party
1952	Wandrekar, Dattatraya Nathoba	Indian National Congress

== Election results ==
=== Assembly Election 1952 ===
1952 Bombay State Legislative Assembly election : Bandra Khar Juhu
Party	Candidate	Votes	%	±%
INC	Wandrekar, Dattatraya Nathoba	13,062	44.67%	New
Socialist	Awsare, Kashibal Vasant	11,305	38.66%	New
Independent	Rebello, Alexis James	1,558	5.33%	New
Independent	Pathare, Wamanrao Shamrao	1,461	5.00%	New
Independent	Kudalkar, Nooruddin	1,303	4.46%	New
Independent	Kooka, Minocher Darasha	554	1.89%	New
Margin of victory		1,757	6.01%	
Turnout		29,243	53.75%	
Total valid votes		29,243		
Registered electors		54,403		
INC win (new seat)				
