= Roha Sudhagad Assembly constituency =

Constituency of the Maharashtra legislative assembly in India

Roha Sudhagad
- Former constituency for the Maharashtra Legislative Assembly

Constituency details
- Country: India
- Region: Western India
- State: Maharashtra
- Established: 1951
- Abolished: 1955
- Total electors: 52,120
- Reservation: None

Roha Sudhagad Assembly constituency was an assembly constituency in the India state of Maharashtra.

== Members of the Legislative Assembly ==
Election	Member	Party
1952	Savant Maruti Sitaram	Indian National Congress

== Election results ==
=== Assembly Election 1952 ===
1952 Bombay State Legislative Assembly election : Roha Sudhagad
Party	Candidate	Votes	%	±%
INC	Savant Maruti Sitaram	14,440	48.77%	New
PWPI	Sanap Pandurang Ramji	10,250	34.62%	New
Socialist	Chandorkar Rajaram Mukund	4,918	16.61%	New
Margin of victory		4,190	14.15%	
Turnout		29,608	56.81%	
Total valid votes		29,608		
Registered electors		52,120		
INC win (new seat)				
