= Agripada Madanpura Foras Road Chunna Bhatti Assembly constituency =

Constituency of the Maharashtra legislative assembly in India

Agripada Madanpura Forasr Bhatti
- Former constituency for the Maharashtra Legislative Assembly

Constituency details
- Country: India
- Region: Western India
- State: Maharashtra
- Established: 1951
- Abolished: 1955
- Total electors: 50,210
- Reservation: None

Agripada Madanpura Forasr Bhatti Assembly constituency was an assembly constituency in the India state of Maharashtra.

== Members of the Legislative Assembly ==
Election	Member	Party
1952	Mohamed, Taher Habib	Indian National Congress

== Election results ==
=== Assembly Election 1952 ===
1952 Bombay State Legislative Assembly election : Agripada Madanpura Foras Road Chunna Bhatti
Party	Candidate	Votes	%	±%
INC	Mohamed, Taher Habib	12,276	50.08%	New
Socialist	Shaikh, Adam Adil	8,750	35.70%	New
Independent	Bakashi, Mohammad Siddiq Bakshi	3,485	14.22%	New
Margin of victory		3,526	14.39%	
Turnout		24,511	48.82%	
Total valid votes		24,511		
Registered electors		50,210		
INC win (new seat)				
