= Pandharpur Mangal Vedha Assembly constituency =

Constituency of the Maharashtra legislative assembly in India

Pandharpur Mangal Vedha
- Former constituency for the Maharashtra Legislative Assembly

Constituency details
- Country: India
- Region: Western India
- State: Maharashtra
- Established: 1951
- Abolished: 1955
- Total electors: 1,10,100

Pandharpur Mangalvedha Assembly constituency was an assembly constituency in the India state of Maharashtra. After the 1955 Delimitation act, it was added to Pandharpur constituency.

== Members of the Legislative Assembly ==
| Election | Member | Party |
|---|---|---|
| 1952 | More Jaywant Ghanshyam | Independent politician |
| 1952 | Kamble Maruti Mahadeo | Indian National Congress |

== Election results ==
=== Assembly Election 1952 ===
1952 Bombay State Legislative Assembly election : Pandharpur Mangal Vedha
| Party | Candidate | Votes | % | ±% |
|---|---|---|---|---|
| Independent | More Jaywant Ghanshyam | 32,563 | 27.64% | New |
| INC | Kamble Maruti Mahadeo | 27,709 | 23.52% | New |
| INC | Badwe Baburao Pralhad | 26,679 | 22.65% | New |
| SCF | Babar Sidram Babaji | 25,327 | 21.50% | New |
| RRP | Sarwaged Sopan Dhondo | 3,705 | 3.14% | New |
| Independent | Arali Bapu Yagappa | 1,829 | 1.55% | New |
| Margin of victory | | 5,884 | 4.99% | |
| Turnout | | 117,812 | 53.50% | |
| Total valid votes | | 117,812 | | |
| Registered electors | | 110,100 | | |
| Independent win (new seat) | | | | |
