= Siddapur Sirsi Mundgod Assembly constituency =

Constituency of the Karnataka legislative assembly in India

Siddapur Sirsi Mundgod
- Former constituency for the Karnataka Legislative Assembly

Constituency details
- Country: India
- Region: South India
- State: Karnataka
- Established: 1951
- Abolished: 1955
- Total electors: 48,557

Siddapur Sirsi Mundgod Assembly constituency was an assembly constituency in the India state of Karnataka.

== Members of the Legislative Assembly ==
Election	Member	Party
1952	Timmappa Manjappa Motansar Hegde	Indian National Congress

== Election results ==
=== Assembly Election 1952 ===
1952 Bombay State Legislative Assembly election : Siddapur Sirsi Mundgod
Party	Candidate	Votes	%	±%
INC	Timmappa Manjappa Motansar Hegde	25,535	77.42%	New
SP	Chaudhri Venkojirao Hanumantrao	7,446	22.58%	New
Margin of victory		18,089	54.85%	
Turnout		32,981	67.92%	
Total valid votes		32,981		
Registered electors		48,557		
INC win (new seat)				
