= Dadar Saitan Chowky Assembly constituency =

Constituency of the Maharashtra legislative assembly in India

Dadar Saitan Chowky
- Former constituency for the Maharashtra Legislative Assembly

Constituency details
- Country: India
- Region: Western India
- State: Maharashtra
- Established: 1952
- Abolished: 1955
- Total electors: 54,078
- Reservation: None

Dadar Saitan Chowky Assembly constituency was an assembly constituency in the India state of Maharashtra.

== Members of the Legislative Assembly ==
Election	Member	Party
1952	Trimbak Ramchandra Naravne	Indian National Congress

== Election results ==
=== Assembly Election 1952 ===
1952 Bombay State Legislative Assembly election : Dadar Saitanchowky
Party	Candidate	Votes	%	±%
INC	Trimbak Ramchandra Naravne	15,058	45.11%	New
Socialist	Atre, Pralhad Keshav	13,248	39.69%	New
Independent	Pendse, Lalji Moreshwar	3,265	9.78%	New
RRP	Shukla, Saryuprasad Ram Prasad	1,808	5.42%	New
Margin of victory		1,810	5.42%	
Turnout		33,379	61.72%	
Total valid votes		33,379		
Registered electors		54,078		
INC win (new seat)				
