= Mewasa Taloda Akrani West Assembly constituency =

Constituency of the Maharashtra legislative assembly in India

Mewasa Taloda Akrani West
- Former constituency for the Maharashtra Legislative Assembly

Constituency details
- Country: India
- Region: Western India
- State: Maharashtra
- Established: 1951
- Abolished: 1955
- Total electors: 95,358
- Reservation: ST

Mewasa Taloda Akrani West Assembly constituency was an assembly constituency in the India state of Maharashtra.

== Members of the Legislative Assembly ==
| Election | Member | Party |
|---|---|---|
| 1952 | Patil, Vishram Hari | Indian National Congress |
| 1952 | Valvi, Janardan Poharya | Indian National Congress |

== Election results ==
=== Assembly Election 1952 ===
1952 Bombay State Legislative Assembly election : Mewasa Taloda Akrani West
| Party | Candidate | Votes | % | ±% |
|---|---|---|---|---|
| INC | Patil, Vishram Hari | 14,734 | 15.57% | New |
| Independent | Ranasaheb Jaideosing Gulabsing | 14,159 | 14.97% | New |
| INC | Valvi, Janardan Poharya | 13,585 | 14.36% | New |
| Socialist | Gujar, Pralhad Bhaidas | 11,500 | 12.15% | New |
| PWPI | Mahajan, Gorakh Hulaji | 10,810 | 11.43% | New |
| Independent | Padvi, Ukhadu Dewla | 10,490 | 11.09% | New |
| PWPI | Bhil, Shakharam Bhagwan | 9,977 | 10.55% | New |
| Socialist | Valvi, Laxman Vedu | 9,357 | 9.89% | New |
| Margin of victory | | 575 | 0.61% | |
| Turnout | | 94,612 | 49.61% | |
| Total valid votes | | 94,612 | | |
| Registered electors | | 95,358 | | |
| INC win (new seat) | | | | |
