= Bhusawal Jamner Assembly constituency =

Constituency of the Maharashtra legislative assembly in India

Bhusawal Jamner
- Former constituency for the Maharashtra Legislative Assembly

Constituency details
- Country: India
- Region: Western India
- State: Maharashtra
- Established: 1952
- Abolished: 1955
- Total electors: 107,773
- Reservation: SC

Bhusawal Jamner Assembly constituency was an assembly constituency in the India state of Maharashtra. In 1955 Delimitation act, it was split into Bhusawal and Jamner.

== Members of the Legislative Assembly ==
Election	Member	Party
1952	Sane Nilkanth Ganesh	Indian National Congress
1952	Vankhade Keshavrao Raghav	Indian National Congress

== Election results ==
=== Assembly Election 1952 ===
1952 Bombay State Legislative Assembly election : Bhusawal Jamner
Party	Candidate	Votes	%	±%
INC	Sane Nilkanth Ganesh	30,473	32.74%	New
INC	Vankhade Keshavrao Raghav	24,880	26.73%	New
PWPI	Gavande Motiram Ramu	9,396	10.09%	New
SCF	Bhalerao Tryambak Sonu	8,825	9.48%	New
Socialist	Pradhan Madhav Ramchandra	8,127	8.73%	New
Independent	Khare Hari Sadashiv	5,232	5.62%	New
Independent	Chandel Umrosing Bisansing	4,436	4.77%	New
Independent	Sayagaonkar Soloman Abraham	1,710	1.84%	New
Margin of victory		21,077	22.64%	
Turnout		93,079	86.37%	
Total valid votes		93,079		
Registered electors		107,773		
INC win (new seat)				
