= Akola Sangamner Assembly constituency =

Constituency of the Maharashtra legislative assembly in India

Akola Sangamner
- Former constituency for the Maharashtra Legislative Assembly

Constituency details
- Country: India
- Region: Western India
- State: Maharashtra
- Established: 1951
- Abolished: 1955
- Total electors: 1,05,006
- Reservation: None

Akola Sangamner Assembly constituency was an assembly constituency in the India state of Maharashtra.

== Members of the Legislative Assembly ==
Election	Member	Party
1952	Bhangare Gopal Shravan	Indian National Congress
1952	Deshmukh Datta Appaji	Kamgar Kisan Paksha

== Election results ==
=== Assembly Election 1952 ===
1952 Bombay State Legislative Assembly election : Akola Sangamner
Party	Candidate	Votes	%	±%
INC	Bhangare Gopal Shravan	17,924	20.87%	New
Kamgar Kisan Paksha	Deshmukh Datta Appaji	17,322	20.17%	New
Kamgar Kisan Paksha	Bhangare Dharma Kama	16,763	19.52%	New
INC	Khatal Bhimajerao Gijaba	15,563	18.12%	New
Socialist	Durve Bhaskar Govind	10,540	12.27%	New
Socialist	Nawale Narayan Rambhau	7,770	9.05%	New
Margin of victory		1,161	1.35%	
Turnout		85,882	40.89%	
Total valid votes		85,882		
Registered electors		105,006		
INC win (new seat)				
