= Bhadgaon Chalisgaon Assembly constituency =

Constituency of the Maharashtra legislative assembly in India

Bhadgaon Chalisgaon
- Former constituency for the Maharashtra Legislative Assembly

Constituency details
- Country: India
- Region: Western India
- State: Maharashtra
- Established: 1951
- Abolished: 1955
- Total electors: 97,879
- Reservation: ST

Bhadgaon Chalisgaon Assembly constituency was an assembly constituency in the India state of Maharashtra.

== Members of the Legislative Assembly ==
Election	Member	Party
1952	Suryavanshi, Motiram Shamrao	Indian National Congress
1952	Tadvi, Jalamkha Sandebajkha	Indian National Congress

== Election results ==
=== Assembly Election 1952 ===
1952 Bombay State Legislative Assembly election : Bhadgaon Chalisgaon
Party	Candidate	Votes	%	±%
INC	Suryavanshi, Motiram Shamrao	33,116	31.61%	New
INC	Tadvi, Jalamkha Sandebajkha	27,285	26.04%	New
Socialist	Bhil Mansing Bhavsing	14,369	13.72%	New
SCF	Pawar, Tukaram Tatyaba	9,935	9.48%	New
Independent	Pawar, Gulabrao Narayanrao	6,745	6.44%	New
Kamgar Kisan Paksha	Ghorpade, Ramsing Bhavsing	6,678	6.37%	New
Independent	Sancheti, Multanchand Fulchand	4,535	4.33%	New
Independent	Patil, Patangrao Ramji	2,105	2.01%	New
Margin of victory		18,747	17.89%	
Turnout		104,768	53.52%	
Total valid votes		104,768		
Registered electors		97,879		
INC win (new seat)				
