= North Malegaon Assembly constituency =

Constituency of the Maharashtra legislative assembly in India

North Malegaon
- Former constituency for the Maharashtra Legislative Assembly

Constituency details
- Country: India
- Region: Western India
- State: Maharashtra
- Established: 1951
- Abolished: 1955
- Total electors: 58,680
- Reservation: None

North Malegaon Assembly constituency was an assembly constituency in the India state of Maharashtra.

== Members of the Legislative Assembly ==
| Election | Member | Party |
|---|---|---|
| 1952 | Mohd. Sabir Abdul Sattar | Indian National Congress |

== Election results ==
=== Assembly Election 1952 ===
1952 Bombay State Legislative Assembly election : North Malegaon
| Party | Candidate | Votes | % | ±% |
|---|---|---|---|---|
| INC | Mohd. Sabir Abdul Sattar | 12,925 | 38.18% | New |
| Socialist | Ansari Haroon Ahmed | 10,694 | 31.59% | New |
| Kamgar Kisan Paksha | Nikam Rajaram Damodar | 5,399 | 15.95% | New |
| Independent | Fadal Sukdeo Vedu | 3,762 | 11.11% | New |
| Independent | Mohd. Haroon Abdul Rehman | 1,077 | 3.18% | New |
| Margin of victory | | 2,231 | 6.59% | |
| Turnout | | 33,857 | 57.70% | |
| Total valid votes | | 33,857 | | |
| Registered electors | | 58,680 | | |
| INC win (new seat) | | | | |
