= Chiplun Khed Assembly constituency =

Constituency of the Maharashtra legislative assembly in India

Chiplun Khed
- Former constituency for the Maharashtra Legislative Assembly

Constituency details
- Country: India
- Region: Western India
- State: Maharashtra
- Established: 1951
- Abolished: 1955
- Total electors: 107,731
- Reservation: SC

Chiplun Khed Assembly constituency was an assembly constituency in the India state of Maharashtra.

== Members of the Legislative Assembly ==
Election	Member	Party
1952	Khedekar Sudkoji Baburao	Indian National Congress
1952	Shetye Tukaram Krishna	Indian National Congress

== Election results ==
=== Assembly Election 1952 ===
1952 Bombay State Legislative Assembly election : Chiplun Khed
Party	Candidate	Votes	%	±%
INC	Khedekar Sudkoji Baburao	17,022	23.60%	New
INC	Shetye Tukaram Krishna	16,882	23.40%	New
Independent	Bhosale Amrit Ganpatrao	13,194	18.29%	New
SCF	Wadavalkar Shankar Laxman	8,829	12.24%	New
Socialist	Sawant Shivaji Shivram	8,287	11.49%	New
Independent	Shinde Rajaram Nagesh	5,297	7.34%	New
Independent	Shinde Hanumantrao Babaji	2,619	3.63%	New
Margin of victory		3,828	5.31%	
Turnout		72,130	33.48%	
Total valid votes		72,130		
Registered electors		107,731		
INC win (new seat)				
