= Poona City South West Assembly constituency =

Constituency of the Maharashtra legislative assembly in India

Poona City South West
- Former constituency for the Maharashtra Legislative Assembly

Constituency details
- Country: India
- Region: Western India
- State: Maharashtra
- Established: 1951
- Abolished: 1955
- Total electors: 59,155
- Reservation: None

Poona City South West Assembly constituency was an assembly constituency in the India state of Maharashtra.

== Members of the Legislative Assembly ==
| Election | Member | Party |
|---|---|---|
| 1952 | Ghorpade Ramchandra Balwant | Indian National Congress |

== Election results ==
=== Assembly Election 1952 ===
1952 Bombay State Legislative Assembly election : Poona City South West
| Party | Candidate | Votes | % | ±% |
|---|---|---|---|---|
| INC | Ghorpade Ramchandra Balwant | 17,875 | 52.71% | New |
| ABHM | Date Shankar Ramchandra | 11,556 | 34.08% | New |
| Socialist | Bedekar Malati Vishram | 4,479 | 13.21% | New |
| Margin of victory | | 6,319 | 18.63% | |
| Turnout | | 33,910 | 57.32% | |
| Total valid votes | | 33,910 | | |
| Registered electors | | 59,155 | | |
| INC win (new seat) | | | | |
