= Haveli Dhond Assembly constituency =

Constituency of the Maharashtra legislative assembly in India

Haveli Dhond
- Former constituency for the Maharashtra Legislative Assembly

Constituency details
- Country: India
- Region: Western India
- State: Maharashtra
- Established: 1951
- Abolished: 1955
- Total electors: 1,01,164
- Reservation: SC

Haveli Dhond Assembly constituency was an assembly constituency in the India state of Maharashtra. After the 1955 Delimitation act, it was merged with Haveli and Baramati constituencies.

== Members of the Legislative Assembly ==
Election	Member	Party
1952	Magar Martand Dhondiba	Indian National Congress
1952	Kharat Ganpat Sambhaji	Indian National Congress

== Election results ==
=== Assembly Election 1952 ===
1952 Bombay State Legislative Assembly election : Haveli Dhond
Party	Candidate	Votes	%	±%
INC	Magar Martand Dhondiba	27,193	28.56%	New
INC	Kharat Ganpat Sambhaji	26,515	27.85%	New
Socialist	Sasane Jaysing Ganpat	13,638	14.32%	New
SCF	Khandale Ramchandra Genuji	11,645	12.23%	New
PWPI	Sonone Dinanath Sadashir	8,305	8.72%	New
PWPI	Tupe Baburao Bhausaheb	5,991	6.29%	New
Independent	Wakhare Raoji Balwant	1,920	2.02%	New
Margin of victory		13,555	14.24%	
Turnout		95,207	47.06%	
Total valid votes		95,207		
Registered electors		101,164		
INC win (new seat)				
