= Ahmednagar Assembly constituency =

Constituency of the Maharashtra legislative assembly in India

Ahmednagar
- Former constituency for the Maharashtra Legislative Assembly

Constituency details
- Country: India
- Region: Western India
- State: Maharashtra
- District: Ahmednagar district
- Established: 1952
- Abolished: 1952
- Total electors: 60,982

Ahmednagar Assembly constituency was a former assembly constituency in the Indian state of Maharashtra.

It was created under the Delimitation of Parliamentary and Assembly Constituencies Order, 1951 and existed only for the first general election held after Indian independence in 1952. The constituency was part of the erstwhile Bombay State and was abolished later in the same year following subsequent administrative reorganisation.

== Members of the Legislative Assembly ==
Election	Member	Party
1952	Kute Vital Ganpat	Indian National Congress

== Election results ==
=== Assembly Election 1952 ===
1952 Bombay State Legislative Assembly election : Ahmednagar
Party	Candidate	Votes	%	±%
INC	Kute Vital Ganpat	16,778	56.51%	New
Socialist	Karandikar Kashinath Shankar	5,589	18.83%	New
Kamgar Kisan Paksha	Bhapkar Hirabai Prabhakar	5,065	17.06%	New
ABHM	Gaikaiwari Gopal Ramchandra	1,396	4.70%	New
Independent	Pathan Sardarkha Amirkha	344	1.16%	New
Forward Bloc (Marxist Group)	Nisal Ramchandra Vithal	323	1.09%	New
Independent	Parkhe Haribhau Ganesh	193	0.65%	New
Margin of victory		11,189	37.69%	
Turnout		29,688	48.68%	
Total valid votes		29,688		
Registered electors		60,982		
INC win (new seat)				
