= Hippargi Bagewadi Assembly constituency =

Constituency of the Karnataka legislative assembly in India

Hippargi Bagewadi
- Former constituency for the Karnataka Legislative Assembly

Constituency details
- Country: India
- Region: South India
- State: Karnataka
- Established: 1951
- Abolished: 1955
- Total electors: 51,578

Hippargi Bagewadi Assembly constituency was an assembly constituency in the India state of Karnataka.

== Members of the Legislative Assembly ==
| Election | Member | Party |
|---|---|---|
| 1952 | Shankargouda Yeshwantgouda Patil | Indian National Congress |

== Election results ==
=== Assembly Election 1952 ===
1952 Bombay State Legislative Assembly election : Hippargi Bagewadi
| Party | Candidate | Votes | % | ±% |
|---|---|---|---|---|
| INC | Shankargouda Yeshwantgouda Patil | 17,752 | 76.32% | New |
| KMPP | Nandi Savaligeppa Guralingappa | 5,507 | 23.68% | New |
| Margin of victory | | 12,245 | 52.65% | |
| Turnout | | 23,259 | 45.09% | |
| Total valid votes | | 23,259 | | |
| Registered electors | | 51,578 | | |
| INC win (new seat) | | | | |
