= Dhulia Assembly constituency =

Constituency of the Maharashtra legislative assembly in India

Dhulia
- Former constituency for the Maharashtra Legislative Assembly

Constituency details
- Country: India
- Region: Western India
- State: Maharashtra
- Established: 1951
- Abolished: 1955
- Total electors: 1,15,384
- Reservation: SC

Dhulia Assembly constituency was an assembly constituency in the India state of Maharashtra. After the 1955 Delimitation act, it was split into Dhulia North and Dhulia South constituencies.

== Members of the Legislative Assembly ==
Election	Member	Party
1952	More, Sukhdeo Totaram	Indian National Congress
1952	Vankhedkar, Sonuji Deoram	Indian National Congress

== Election results ==
=== Assembly Election 1952 ===
1952 Bombay State Legislative Assembly election : Dhulia
Party	Candidate	Votes	%	±%
INC	More, Sukhdeo Totaram	28,467	23.37%	New
INC	Vankhedkar, Sonuji Deoram	21,540	17.68%	New
CPI	Parolekar, Nathu Tukaram	18,248	14.98%	New
PWPI	Ahire, Rajaram Ganpat	16,236	13.33%	New
Independent	Kacheva, Pundlik Mohansing	13,710	11.25%	New
Socialist	Marathe, Vinayak Tulshiram	11,462	9.41%	New
SCF	Pendharkar, Namdeorao Dhanajirao	8,930	7.33%	New
Independent	Madane, Gopal Sadashiv	3,227	2.65%	New
Margin of victory		10,219	8.39%	
Turnout		121,820	52.79%	
Total valid votes		121,820		
Registered electors		115,384		
INC win (new seat)				
