= Akalkot-South Sholapur Assembly constituency =

Constituency of the Maharashtra legislative assembly in India

Akalkot-South Sholapur
- Former constituency for the Maharashtra Legislative Assembly

Constituency details
- Country: India
- Region: Western India
- State: Maharashtra
- District: Solapur
- Lok Sabha constituency: Solapur
- Established: 1952
- Abolished: 1952
- Total electors: 1,04,003
- Reservation: None

Akalkot-South Sholapur Assembly constituency was an assembly constituency in the India state of Maharashtra.

== Members of the Legislative Assembly ==
Election	Member	Party
1952	Kadadi Madiwallappa Bandappa	Indian National Congress
1952	Sonawane Ganpat Laxman	Indian National Congress

== Election results ==
=== Assembly Election 1952 ===
1952 Bombay State Legislative Assembly election : Akalkot-South Sholapur
Party	Candidate	Votes	%	±%
INC	Kadadi Madiwallappa Bandappa	26,354	25.62%	New
PWPI	Bhosale Jaysinh Fattesinh	23,505	22.85%	New
INC	Sonawane Ganpat Laxman	23,371	22.72%	New
SCF	Kamble Nivratti Satwaji	14,190	13.79%	New
Independent	Warad Chanbasappa Mallappa	7,700	7.48%	New
Socialist	Deshmukh Manaji Balwant	5,420	5.27%	New
Independent	Ghadge Keshao Narsinh	2,334	2.27%	New
Margin of victory		2,849	2.77%	
Turnout		102,874	49.46%	
Total valid votes		102,874		
Registered electors		104,003		
INC win (new seat)				
