= Bhor Velhe South Mulshi Assembly constituency =

Constituency of the Maharashtra legislative assembly in India

Bhor Velhe South Mulshi
- Former constituency for the Maharashtra Legislative Assembly

Constituency details
- Country: India
- Region: Western India
- State: Maharashtra
- Established: 1951
- Abolished: 1955
- Total electors: 58,289
- Reservation: None

Bhor Velhe South Mulshi Assembly constituency was an assembly constituency in the India state of Maharashtra.

== Members of the Legislative Assembly ==
Election	Member	Party
1952	Mohol Namdeo Sadashiv	Indian National Congress

== Election results ==
=== Assembly Election 1952 ===
1952 Bombay State Legislative Assembly election : Bhor Velhe South Mulshi
Party	Candidate	Votes	%	±%
INC	Mohol Namdeo Sadashiv	11,251	50.54%	New
PWPI	Khopade Bhagwant Waman	3,832	17.21%	New
Independent	Potnis Gopinath Balkrishna	2,900	13.03%	New
Socialist	Tambe Pandurang Bala	2,803	12.59%	New
RRP	Darwatkar Vishnu Damodhar	951	4.27%	New
Independent	Dighe Shrikrishna Shankar	525	2.36%	New
Margin of victory		7,419	33.33%	
Turnout		22,262	38.19%	
Total valid votes		22,262		
Registered electors		58,289		
INC win (new seat)				
