= Chaupati Grant Road Tardeo Assembly constituency =

Constituency of the Maharashtra legislative assembly in India

Chaupati Grant Road Tardeo
- Former constituency for the Maharashtra Legislative Assembly

Constituency details
- Country: India
- Region: Western India
- State: Maharashtra
- Established: 1951
- Abolished: 1955
- Total electors: 54,184
- Reservation: None

Chaupati Grant Road Tardeo Assembly constituency was an assembly constituency in the India state of Maharashtra.

== Members of the Legislative Assembly ==
Election	Member	Party
1952	Bharucha, Naushir Cursetji	Socialist Party

== Election results ==
=== Assembly Election 1952 ===
1952 Bombay State Legislative Assembly election : Chaupati Grant Road Tardeo
Party	Candidate	Votes	%	±%
Socialist	Bharucha, Naushir Cursetji	13,798	45.18%	New
INC	Sathe, Kashibai Ramchandra	13,027	42.65%	New
Independent	Eaikini, Venkatrao Manjunath	1,827	5.98%	New
Independent	Kalyanpur, Dattatraya Shantaram	1,138	3.73%	New
RRP	Balsey, Vashishta Shiv	751	2.46%	New
Margin of victory		771	2.52%	
Turnout		30,541	56.37%	
Total valid votes		30,541		
Registered electors		54,184		
Socialist win (new seat)				
