= Kavathe Mahankal (Miraj) - Tasgaon (East) Assembly constituency =

Constituency of the Maharashtra legislative assembly in India

Kavathe Mahankal (Miraj) - Tasgaon (East)
- Former constituency for the Maharashtra Legislative Assembly

Constituency details
- Country: India
- Region: Western India
- State: Maharashtra
- Established: 1951
- Abolished: 1955
- Total electors: 51,250
- Reservation: None

Kavathe Mahankal (Miraj) - Tasgaon (East) Assembly constituency was an assembly constituency in the India state of Maharashtra.

== Members of the Legislative Assembly ==
Election	Member	Party
1952	Patil Gundu Dasharath	Indian National Congress

== Election results ==
=== Assembly Election 1952 ===
1952 Bombay State Legislative Assembly election : Kavathe Mahankal (Miraj) - Tasgaon (East)
Party	Candidate	Votes	%	±%
INC	Patil Gundu Dasharath	18,963	64.23%	New
Socialist	Shendage Baburao Dada	4,469	15.14%	New
PWPI	Mohite Jijaba Kondiba	3,801	12.87%	New
Kamgar Kisan Paksha	Kalke Nevritti Babu	2,291	7.76%	New
Margin of victory		14,494	49.09%	
Turnout		29,524	57.61%	
Total valid votes		29,524		
Registered electors		51,250		
INC win (new seat)				
