= Mandangad Dapoli Assembly constituency =

Constituency of the Maharashtra legislative assembly in India

Mandangad Dapoli
- Former constituency for the Maharashtra Legislative Assembly

Constituency details
- Country: India
- Region: Western India
- State: Maharashtra
- Established: 1951
- Abolished: 1955
- Reservation: None

Mandangad Dapoli Assembly constituency was an assembly constituency in the India state of Maharashtra.

== Members of the Legislative Assembly ==
Election	Member	Party
1952	Peje Shantaram Laxman	Indian National Congress

== Election results ==
=== Assembly Election 1952 ===
1952 Bombay State Legislative Assembly election : Mandangad Dapoli
Party	Candidate	Votes	%	±%
INC	Peje Shantaram Laxman	9,764	45.63%	New
Socialist	Parkar Mohmad Abdulla Mulla Ahmed	4,714	22.03%	New
Independent	Relekar Prabhakar Ganpat	3,619	16.91%	New
Independent	Belose Ram Chandra Laxman	2,137	9.99%	New
Independent	Agarkar Achuyat Jagannath	631	2.95%	New
Independent	Sule Satyaniwas Ganesh	534	2.50%	New
Margin of victory		5,050	23.60%	
Turnout		21,399	40.24%	
Total valid votes		21,399		
Registered electors		53,175		
INC win (new seat)				
