= Poona City Central Assembly constituency =

Constituency of the Maharashtra legislative assembly in India

Poona City Central
- Former constituency for the Maharashtra Legislative Assembly

Constituency details
- Country: India
- Region: Western India
- State: Maharashtra
- Established: 1951
- Abolished: 1955
- Total electors: 56,117
- Reservation: None

Poona City Central Assembly constituency was an assembly constituency in the India state of Maharashtra.

== Members of the Legislative Assembly ==
| Election | Member | Party |
|---|---|---|
| 1952 | Sathe Vinayak Krishna | Indian National Congress |

== Election results ==
=== Assembly Election 1952 ===
1952 Bombay State Legislative Assembly election : Poona City Central
| Party | Candidate | Votes | % | ±% |
|---|---|---|---|---|
| INC | Sathe Vinayak Krishna | 19,584 | 57.24% | New |
| RRP | Abyankar Narhar Govind | 9,557 | 27.93% | New |
| Socialist | Wadke Ramchandra Pandharinath | 2,755 | 8.05% | New |
| PWPI | Mhote Pandharinath Mahadeo | 2,319 | 6.78% | New |
| Margin of victory | | 10,027 | 29.31% | |
| Turnout | | 34,215 | 60.97% | |
| Total valid votes | | 34,215 | | |
| Registered electors | | 56,117 | | |
| INC win (new seat) | | | | |
