= Chira Bazar Thakurdwar Fanaswadi Assembly constituency =

Constituency of the Maharashtra legislative assembly in India

Chira Bazar Thakurdwar Fanaswadi
- Former constituency for the Maharashtra Legislative Assembly

Constituency details
- Country: India
- Region: Western India
- State: Maharashtra
- Established: 1951
- Abolished: 1955
- Total electors: 55,825
- Reservation: None

Chira Bazar Thakurdwar Fanaswadi Assembly constituency was an assembly constituency in the India state of Maharashtra.

== Members of the Legislative Assembly ==
Election	Member	Party
1952	Yagnik Bhanushankar Manchharam	Indian National Congress

== Election results ==
=== Assembly Election 1952 ===
1952 Bombay State Legislative Assembly election : Chira Bazar Thakurdwar Fanaswadi
Party	Candidate	Votes	%	±%
INC	Yagnik Bhanushankar Manchharam	17,812	53.48%	New
Socialist	Samant Yeshwant Atmaram	9,336	28.03%	New
Independent	Talpade Manikram, Nanabhai	3,851	11.56%	New
RRP	Talpade Shakuntala Keshav	2,062	6.19%	New
Independent	Kapadia Purshottam Raghunath	247	0.74%	New
Margin of victory		8,476	25.45%	
Turnout		33,308	59.67%	
Total valid votes		33,308		
Registered electors		55,825		
INC win (new seat)				
