= Madha Mohol Assembly constituency =

Constituency of the Maharashtra legislative assembly in India

Madha Mohol
- Former constituency for the Maharashtra Legislative Assembly

Constituency details
- Country: India
- Region: Western India
- State: Maharashtra
- Established: 1951
- Abolished: 1955
- Total electors: 55,237
- Reservation: None

Madha Mohol Assembly constituency was an assembly constituency in the India state of Maharashtra. After the 1955 Delimitation act, it was split into Madha and Sangola constituencies.

== Members of the Legislative Assembly ==
Election	Member	Party
1952	Gund Tawaji Bajirao	Peasants and Workers Party of India

== Election results ==
=== Assembly Election 1952 ===
1952 Bombay State Legislative Assembly election : Madha Mohol
Party	Candidate	Votes	%	±%
PWPI	Gund Tawaji Bajirao	17,413	58.42%	New
INC	Shende Ganpat Sakharam	8,419	28.25%	New
Socialist	Kakade Namdeo Mahadeo	3,975	13.34%	New
Margin of victory		8,994	30.17%	
Turnout		29,807	53.96%	
Total valid votes		29,807		
Registered electors		55,237		
PWPI win (new seat)				
