= Managoli Bableswar Assembly constituency =

Constituency of the Karnataka legislative assembly in India

Managoli Bableswar
- Former constituency for the Karnataka Legislative Assembly

Constituency details
- Country: India
- Region: South India
- State: Karnataka
- Established: 1951
- Abolished: 1955
- Total electors: 51,817

Managoli Bableswar Assembly constituency was an assembly constituency in the Indian state of Karnataka.

== Members of the Legislative Assembly ==
Election	Member	Party
1952	Shivapgauda Bapugauda Patil	Indian National Congress

== Election results ==
=== Assembly Election 1952 ===
1952 Bombay State Legislative Assembly election : Managoli Bableswar
Party	Candidate	Votes	%	±%
INC	Shivapgauda Bapugauda Patil	19,437	73.23%	New
KMPP	Payannavar Basappa Ramappa	6,007	22.63%	New
Independent	Doddihal Gururao Tammaji	1,097	4.13%	New
Margin of victory		13,430	50.60%	
Turnout		26,541	51.22%	
Total valid votes		26,541		
Registered electors		51,817		
INC win (new seat)				
