= Tasgaon (West) Assembly constituency =

Constituency of the Maharashtra legislative assembly in India

Tasgaon West
- Former constituency for the Maharashtra Legislative Assembly

Constituency details
- Country: India
- Region: Western India
- State: Maharashtra
- Established: 1952
- Abolished: 1955
- Total electors: 51,683

Tasgaon West Assembly constituency was an assembly constituency in the India state of Maharashtra. In 1955 Delimitation act, it was split into Tasgaon and Vita.

== Members of the Legislative Assembly ==
Election	Member	Party
1952	Suryawanshi Dattajirao Bhaurao	Indian National Congress

== Election results ==
=== Assembly Election 1952 ===
1952 Bombay State Legislative Assembly election : Tasgaon West
Party	Candidate	Votes	%	±%
INC	Suryawanshi Dattajirao Bhaurao	20,105	55.42%	New
PWPI	Lad Ganpati Dada	7,880	21.72%	New
Socialist	Koli Ganpati Naiku	5,286	14.57%	New
Independent	Lugade Ramchandra Dnyanoba	3,009	8.29%	New
Margin of victory		12,225	33.70%	
Turnout		36,280	70.20%	
Total valid votes		36,280		
Registered electors		51,683		
INC win (new seat)				
