= Maval North Mulshi Assembly constituency =

Constituency of the Maharashtra legislative assembly in India

Maval North Mulshi
- Former constituency for the Maharashtra Legislative Assembly

Constituency details
- Country: India
- Region: Western India
- State: Maharashtra
- Established: 1951
- Abolished: 1955
- Total electors: 58,972
- Reservation: None

Maval North Mulshi Assembly constituency was an assembly constituency in the India state of Maharashtra. After the 1955 Delimitation act, it was merged into Maval constituency.

== Members of the Legislative Assembly ==
Election	Member	Party
1952	Dabhade Veedharval Yeshwantrao	Independent politician

== Election results ==
=== Assembly Election 1952 ===
1952 Bombay State Legislative Assembly election : Maval North Mulshi
Party	Candidate	Votes	%	±%
Independent	Dabhade Veedharval Yeshwantrao	15,407	54.59%	New
INC	Gupe Gajanan Maheshwar	7,288	25.82%	New
Socialist	Baware Moreshwar Gopal	3,726	13.20%	New
PWPI	Soman Moreshwar Chintaman	904	3.20%	New
Independent	Dhamale Shankarrao Vithalrao	899	3.19%	New
Margin of victory		8,119	28.77%	
Turnout		28,224	47.86%	
Total valid votes		28,224		
Registered electors		58,972		
Independent win (new seat)				
