= Kalyan Central Kalyan Camp Assembly constituency =

Constituency of the Maharashtra legislative assembly in India

Kalyan Central Kalyan Camp
- Former constituency for the Maharashtra Legislative Assembly

Constituency details
- Country: India
- Region: Western India
- State: Maharashtra
- Established: 1951
- Abolished: 1955
- Total electors: 51,884
- Reservation: None

Kalyan Central Kalyan Camp Assembly constituency was an assembly constituency in the India state of Maharashtra. After the 1955 Delimitation act, it was split into Kalyan, Murbad and Ulhasnagar constituencies.

== Members of the Legislative Assembly ==
Election	Member	Party
1952	Mansukhani Khanchand Gopaldas	Independent politician

== Election results ==
=== Assembly Election 1952 ===
1952 Bombay State Legislative Assembly election : Kalyan Central Kalyan Camp
Party	Candidate	Votes	%	±%
Independent	Mansukhani Khanchand Gopaldas	12,879	39.41%	New
INC	Tehalramani Parsaram Vishinising	8,109	24.81%	New
Socialist	Bherwani Assandas Nanikram	4,596	14.06%	New
CPI	Purswani Bhojraj Sahaldas	2,770	8.48%	New
Independent	Shimpi Bhiku Martand	1,620	4.96%	New
Independent	Thakur Kherajmal Hiranand	1,578	4.83%	New
PWPI	Vidyarthi Parcha Kewalram	627	1.92%	New
Independent	Harijan Ransi Velji	499	1.53%	New
Margin of victory		4,770	14.60%	
Turnout		32,678	62.98%	
Total valid votes		32,678		
Registered electors		51,884		
Independent win (new seat)				
