= Athani Chikodi Assembly constituency =

Constituency of the Karnataka legislative assembly in India

Athani Chikodi
- Former constituency for the State Legislative Assembly

Constituency details
- Country: India
- State: Mysore State
- Established: 1951
- Abolished: 1955
- Total electors: 44,377

Athani Chikodi Assembly constituencywas an assembly constituency in the India state of Mysore State.

== Members of the Legislative Assembly ==
| Election | Member | Party |
|---|---|---|
| 1952 | Gunjal Padmappa Hariyappa | Indian National Congress |

== Election results ==
=== Assembly Election 1952 ===
1952 Bombay State Legislative Assembly election : Athani Chikodi
| Party | Candidate | Votes | % | ±% |
|---|---|---|---|---|
| INC | Gunjal Padmappa Hariyappa | 15,577 | 50.82% | New |
| Independent | Powar Desai Dhairyashilrao Bhojraj | 7,110 | 23.20% | New |
| Independent | Kore Chidanand Basaprabhu | 5,634 | 18.38% | New |
| Independent | Huddar Yeshwant Bharma | 2,330 | 7.60% | New |
| Margin of victory | | 8,467 | 27.62% | |
| Turnout | | 30,651 | 69.07% | |
| Total valid votes | | 30,651 | | |
| Registered electors | | 44,377 | | |
| INC win (new seat) | | | | |
