= Phaltan Man Assembly constituency =

Constituency of the Maharashtra legislative assembly in India

Phaltan Man
- Former constituency for the Maharashtra Legislative Assembly

Constituency details
- Country: India
- Region: Western India
- State: Maharashtra
- Established: 1951
- Abolished: 1955
- Total electors: 91,163
- Reservation: SC

Phaltan–Man Assembly constituency was a former assembly constituency in the Republic of India state of Maharashtra. After 1955 Delimitation Act, its boundaries were revised and the area was added into the Phaltan Assembly constituency.

== Members of the Legislative Assembly ==
Election	Member	Party
1952	Naik Nimbalkar Malojirao Alias Nanasaheb	Indian National Congress
1952	Ganpatrao Devji Tapase	Indian National Congress

== Election results ==
=== Assembly Election 1952 ===
1952 Bombay State Legislative Assembly election : Phaltan Man
Party	Candidate	Votes	%	±%
INC	Naik Nimbalkar Malojirao Alias Nanasaheb	31,633	35.00%	New
INC	Ganpatrao Devji Tapase	26,887	29.75%	New
Kamgar Kisan Paksha	Nalavade Krishna Bala	11,864	13.13%	New
SCF	Bandisode Sadashiv Maruti	7,856	8.69%	New
Independent	Satpute Babu Rama	5,033	5.57%	New
Independent	Jagdale Shamrao Banduji	3,966	4.39%	New
Socialist	Kachare Bapurao Bhaurao	3,140	3.47%	New
Margin of victory		19,769	21.87%	
Turnout		90,379	99.14%	
Total valid votes		90,379		
Registered electors		91,163		
INC win (new seat)				
