= Palghar Jawhar Assembly constituency =

Constituency of the Maharashtra legislative assembly in India

Palghar Jawhar
- Former constituency for the Maharashtra Legislative Assembly

Constituency details
- Country: India
- Region: Western India
- State: Maharashtra
- Established: 1951
- Abolished: 1955
- Total electors: 1,00,009
- Reservation: ST

Palghar Jawhar Assembly constituency was an assembly constituency in the India state of Maharashtra.

== Members of the Legislative Assembly ==
Election	Member	Party
1952	Mukne Trimbak Bhau	Indian National Congress
1952	Meher Maruti Padmakar	Socialist Party

== Election results ==
=== Assembly Election 1952 ===
1952 Bombay State Legislative Assembly election : Palghar Jawhar
Party	Candidate	Votes	%	±%
INC	Mukne Trimbak Bhau	20,523	21.08%	New
Socialist	Meher Maruti Padmakar	19,107	19.63%	New
INC	Shroff Jayantiben Chhotalal	18,739	19.25%	New
Socialist	Chaudhuri Ravjibhai Pandu	17,395	17.87%	New
PWPI	Kavli Ramchndra Dadaji	8,209	8.43%	New
Independent	Kedar Raju Navsha	4,912	5.05%	New
Independent	Parulekar Shyam Vishnu	3,463	3.56%	New
Independent	Bhat Narayan Trimbak	2,566	2.64%	New
Independent	Patil Tukaram Kanhaji	2,430	2.50%	New
Margin of victory		1,784	1.83%	
Turnout		97,344	48.67%	
Total valid votes		97,344		
Registered electors		100,009		
INC win (new seat)				
