= Makhajan Assembly constituency =

Constituency of the Maharashtra legislative assembly in India

Makhajan
- Former constituency for the Maharashtra Legislative Assembly

Constituency details
- Country: India
- Region: Western India
- State: Maharashtra
- Established: 1961
- Abolished: 1964
- Total electors: 59,698
- Reservation: SC

Makhajan Assembly constituency was an assembly constituency in the India state of Maharashtra. After the 1964 Delimitation act, it was split into Guhagar, Chiplun and Sangameshwar constituencies.

== Members of the Legislative Assembly ==
Election	Member	Party
1962	Vithal Laxman Reelkar	Indian National Congress

== Election results ==
=== Assembly Election 1962 ===
1962 Maharashtra Legislative Assembly election : Makhajan
Party	Candidate	Votes	%	±%
INC	Vithal Laxman Reelkar	9,682	42.48%	New
ABJS	Shantaram Devram Kenavadekar	5,094	22.35%	New
Independent	Vishram Shivram Kadam	3,353	14.71%	New
RPI	Gangaram Bhikaji Kambale	2,134	9.36%	New
Margin of victory		4,588	20.13%	
Turnout		22,792	33.94%	
Registered electors		59,698		
INC win (new seat)				
