= Mokhada Assembly constituency =

Constituency of the Maharashtra legislative assembly in India

Mokhada
- Former constituency for the Maharashtra Legislative Assembly

Constituency details
- Country: India
- Region: Western India
- State: Maharashtra
- Established: 1961
- Abolished: 1964
- Total electors: 70,337
- Reservation: ST

Mokhada Assembly constituency was an assembly constituency in the India state of Maharashtra.

== Members of the Legislative Assembly ==
Election	Member	Party
1962	Malu Hari Veer	Indian National Congress

== Election results ==
=== Assembly Election 1962 ===
1962 Maharashtra Legislative Assembly election : Mokhada
Party	Candidate	Votes	%	±%
INC	Malu Hari Veer	12,189	43.13%	New
PWPI	Pandurang Ramchandra Patil	6,954	24.61%	New
PSP	Pratap Limbaji Burse	4,133	14.62%	New
Independent	Dattatraya Ramchandra Pawar	1,809	6.40%	New
Margin of victory		5,235	18.52%	
Turnout		28,262	35.66%	
Registered electors		70,337		
INC win (new seat)				
