= Kasa Assembly constituency =

Constituency of the Maharashtra legislative assembly in India

Kasa
- Former constituency for the Maharashtra Legislative Assembly

Constituency details
- Country: India
- Region: Western India
- State: Maharashtra
- Established: 1962
- Abolished: 1978
- Total electors: 84,329

Kasa Assembly constituency was an assembly constituency in the India state of Maharashtra.

== Members of the Legislative Assembly ==
| Election | Member | Party |
|---|---|---|
| 1962 | Dhakatya Posha Sutar | Communist Party of India |
| 1967 | Sumada Rajaram Vithal | Indian National Congress |
| 1972 | Sumada Rajaram Vithal | Indian National Congress |

== Election results ==
=== Assembly Election 1972 ===
1972 Maharashtra Legislative Assembly election : Kasa
| Party | Candidate | Votes | % | ±% |
|---|---|---|---|---|
| INC | Sumada Rajaram Vithal | 19,453 | 44.28% | ▲13.27 |
| CPI(M) | Sutar Dhakat Posha | 12,496 | 28.44% | ▲6.76 |
| SSP | Kaluram Kakadya Dhodade | 9,172 | 20.88% | New |
| Margin of victory | | 6,957 | 15.84% | ▲9.37 |
| Turnout | | 43,934 | 48.76% | ▼3.34 |
| Registered electors | | 84,329 | | ▲19.46 |
| INC hold | | Swing | ▲13.27 | |

=== Assembly Election 1967 ===
1967 Maharashtra Legislative Assembly election : Kasa
| Party | Candidate | Votes | % | ±% |
|---|---|---|---|---|
| INC | R. V. Sumada | 12,134 | 31.01% | ▲4.32 |
| PSP | K. K. Dhodade | 9,605 | 24.55% | ▲14.25 |
| CPI(M) | L. S. Kome | 8,485 | 21.68% | New |
| ABJS | R. G. Padekar | 4,684 | 11.97% | New |
| Margin of victory | | 2,529 | 6.46% | ▼20.86 |
| Turnout | | 39,131 | 49.45% | ▼12.61 |
| Registered electors | | 70,591 | | ▲29.52 |
| INC gain from CPI | | Swing | ▼23.00 | |

=== Assembly Election 1962 ===
1962 Maharashtra Legislative Assembly election : Kasa
| Party | Candidate | Votes | % | ±% |
|---|---|---|---|---|
| CPI | Dhakatya Posha Sutar | 20,032 | 54.01% | New |
| INC | Mahadeo Gopal Kadu | 9,899 | 26.69% | New |
| PSP | Lahanu Ladakya Dhinde | 3,818 | 10.29% | New |
| Margin of victory | | 10,133 | 27.32% | |
| Turnout | | 37,088 | 61.92% | |
| Registered electors | | 54,504 | | |
| CPI win (new seat) | | | | |
