= Gowardhan Assembly constituency =

Constituency of the Maharashtra legislative assembly in India

Gowardhan
- Former constituency for the Maharashtra Legislative Assembly

Constituency details
- Country: India
- Region: Western India
- State: Maharashtra
- Established: 1962
- Abolished: 1962
- Total electors: 68,975

Gowardhan Assembly constituency was an assembly constituency in the India state of Maharashtra.

== Members of the Legislative Assembly ==
Election	Member	Party
1962	Rambahau Chinkaji Salve	Indian National Congress

== Election results ==
=== Assembly Election 1962 ===
1962 Maharashtra Legislative Assembly election : Gowardhan
Party	Candidate	Votes	%	±%
INC	Rambahau Chinkaji Salve	10,206	36.52%	New
RPI	Kachruji Muadhaji Jumde	6,388	22.86%	New
Independent	Namdeo Vidhoba Sable	4,869	17.42%	New
ABJS	Sonaji Puniaji Jadhao	1,659	5.94%	New
Independent	Dharmraj Vyankatesh Tayde	1,461	5.23%	New
Independent	Bhikya Kadtya Jogdand	954	3.41%	New
Margin of victory		3,818	13.66%	
Turnout		27,950	37.02%	
Registered electors		68,975		
INC win (new seat)				
