= 1962 Maharashtra Legislative Assembly election =

State assembly election in India

Maharashtra State Assembly Elections, 1962
- 19 February 1962

All 264 assembly constituencies to Maharashtra Legislative Assembly 133 seats needed for a majority
- Turnout: 60.36% (▲7.20%)
	Majority party	Minority party
	INC	PWPI
Party	INC	PWPI
Seats won	215	15
Popular vote	5,617,347	818,801
Percentage	51.22%	7.47%
Chief Minister before election
Yashwantrao Chavan
INC
Elected Chief Minister
Yashwantrao Chavan
INC

The 1962 Maharashtra State Assembly election was held for the second term of the Maharashtra Vidhan Sabha. A total of 264 seats were contested. The Indian National Congress won 215 of the 264 seats.

== List of participating political parties ==
Party	Abbreviation
National Parties
Akhil Bharatiya Jana Sangh	BJS
Swatantra Party	SWA
Indian National Congress	INC
Socialist Party of India	SOC
Praja Socialist Party	PSP
Communist Party of India	CPI
State Parties
Peasants and Workers Party	PWP
Republican Party of India	RPI
Registered (Unrecognised) Parties
Akhil Bharatiya Hindu Mahasabha	HMS
Akhil Bharatiya Ram Rajya Parishad	RRP

== Results ==
=== Party results ===
Summary of results of the Maharashtra State Assembly election, 1962
Political Party	No. of candidates	No. of elected	Seat change	Number of Votes	% of Votes	Change in vote %
Indian National Congress 215 / 264 (81%)	264	215	▲80	5,617,347	51.22%	▲2.56%
Peasants and Workers Party of India 15 / 264 (6%)	79	15	▼16	818,801	7.47%	▲0.81%
Praja Socialist Party 9 / 264 (3%)	101	9	▼24	792,755	7.23%	▼1.74%
Communist Party of India 6 / 264 (2%)	56	6	▼7	647,390	5.90%	▲2.27%
Republican Party of India 3 / 264 (1%)	66	3	▼10 (from SCF seats)	589,653	5.38%	▼0.85% (from SCF vote share)
Socialist Party 1 / 264 (0.4%)	14	1	▲1	54,764	0.50%	▲0.50% (New Party)
Akhil Bharatiya Jana Sangh	127	0	▼4	548,097	5.00%	▲3.44%
Swatantra Party	9	0	(New Party)	48,484	0.44%	▲0.44% (New Party)
Akhil Bharatiya Hindu Mahasabha	5	0	▼1	12,109	0.11%	▼0.32%
Independents 15 / 264 (6%)	437	15	▼19	1,836,095	16.74%	▼7.03%
Total	1161	264	Steady	10,966,279	60.36%	▲7.20%

=== Results by constituency ===
Winner, runner-up, voter turnout, and victory margin in every constituency
Assembly Constituency		Turnout	Winner				Runner Up				Margin
#k	Names	%	Candidate	Party	Votes	%	Candidate	Party	Votes	%	Margin
Greater Bombay District
1	Colaba	53.27%	Kalaram Shankar Dharia	INC	19,351	53.89%	Phiroze Jamshedji Shroff	SWA	7,073	19.70%	12,278
2	Mandvi	54.19%	Abdul Kadar Salebhoy	INC	19,101	49.61%	Manohar Gopinath Kotwal	PSP	8,718	22.64%	10,383
3	Dongri	60.09%	Mustafa Gulamnabi Faki	INC	18,906	50.60%	Gulam Mahmud Haji Noor Mohamed Banatwalla	Independent	18,457	49.40%	449
4	Kumbharwada	57.20%	Bhanushankar Manchharam Yagnik	INC	26,545	52.58%	Shantilal Girdharlal Patel	PSP	16,833	33.35%	9,712
5	Dhobitalao	52.37%	Shivarayan Kailas	INC	19,144	63.85%	Marutirao Namdeo Tanpure	Independent	4,661	15.55%	14,483
6	Girgaon	66.77%	Anant Namjoshi	INC	24,107	48.55%	Govind Moreshwar Pendse	Independent	13,178	26.54%	10,929
7	Walkeshwar	58.92%	Maniben Nanubhai Desai	INC	24,351	49.49%	Piloo Homi Mody	SWA	10,187	20.71%	14,164
8	Mahalaxmi	60.33%	Jehangir Taleyarkhan Homi	INC	26,768	58.49%	Shantaram Sawalram Mirajkar	CPI	8,009	17.50%	18,759
9	Byculla	60.67%	Qamar Nayer Ahmed	INC	19,409	35.15%	Bapurao Dhondiba Jagtap	CPI	16,713	30.27%	2,696
10	Love Grove	57.44%	Puna Tabha Patel	INC	24,598	43.95%	Palji Hamabhai Boricha	RPI	18,823	33.63%	5,775
11	Nagpada	59.40%	Vishwanath Rajanna Tulla	INC	17,625	39.82%	Mahmood Mahomed Mulla	Independent	12,664	28.61%	4,961
12	Mazgaon	61.37%	Vithal Krishnaji Torasakar	INC	19,654	47.36%	Ramchandr Krishnaji Bhogale	CPI	12,263	29.55%	7,391
13	Sewree	65.23%	Sawalram Gopal Patkar	CPI	33,341	50.74%	Madhavrao Parsharam Thorat	INC	24,871	37.85%	8,470
14	Parel	65.95%	Madhavrao Ganpatrao Mani	INC	20,784	45.80%	Vishwanath Krishna Tembe	PSP	5,349	11.79%	4,581
15	Matunga	64.40%	Liladhar Passu Shah	INC	21,258	48.62%	M. Madhavan	PSP	18,707	42.79%	2,551
16	Naigaon	56.43%	Shakuntala Chintaman Salve	INC	20,731	39.40%	Wamanrao Siraram Pagare	RPI	16,414	31.19%	4,317
17	Worli	62.94%	Madhav Narayan Birje	INC	24,041	43.39%	Vithal Yashwant Mohite	RPI	18,008	32.50%	6,033
18	Dadar	70.07%	Pralhad Keshav Atre	Independent	22,469	40.76%	Trimbak Ramchandra Narawane	INC	21,843	39.62%	626
19	Mahim	59.90%	Frederick Michael Pinto	PSP	19,036	41.28%	Lakshmikant Narayan Welingker	INC	16,729	36.27%	2,307
20	Parle Andheri	64.91%	Shantilal Harijivan Shah	INC	34,349	46.23%	Balkrishana Shantaram Dhume	CPI	29,127	39.20%	5,222
21	Bandra	64.27%	Purushottam Ganesh Kher	INC	45,235	64.33%	Arthur William Felix Menezes	SWA	14,548	20.69%	30,687
22	Kurla	61.83%	Anjanabai Narhar Magar	INC	34,153	45.66%	Manoharlal Mangalsain Marwah	RPI	24,656	32.96%	9,497
23	Chembur	65.18%	Vadilal Chatrabhuj Gandhi	INC	59,446	56.19%	Raghunath Janardan Dhupkar	CPI	19,319	18.26%	40,127
24	Borivali	62.24%	Ishwarlal Pranjiwandas Parekh	INC	55,940	59.53%	Padmakar Balkrishna Samant	Socialist Party (India)	16,601	17.67%	39,339
Thana District
25	Thane	62.86%	Champa Govardhan Mokal	INC	20,583	41.62%	B. K. Khopar	CPI	11,432	23.12%	9,151
26	Bassein	79.08%	Hari Govindrao Vartak	INC	36,498	59.00%	Sadanand G. Warty	PSP	20,430	33.03%	16,068
27	Palghar	71.26%	Shridhar Sakharam Patil	INC	21,796	43.63%	Navanitrai Bhogilal Shah	PSP	17,447	34.93%	4,349
28	Dahanu	68.97%	Shamrao Ramchandra Patil	INC	13,533	41.42%	Godavari Shamrao Parulekar	CPI	11,403	34.90%	2,130
29	Kasa	61.92%	Dhakatya Posha Sutar	CPI	20,032	54.01%	Mahadeo Gopal Kadu	INC	9,899	26.69%	10,133
30	Jawhar	48.54%	Baburao Sadashiv Jadhav	INC	13,819	44.21%	Somnath Ramawani	ABJS	7,176	22.96%	6,643
31	Bhiwandi	54.68%	Bango Nana Bhoir	INC	20,824	45.84%	Bhalchandra Shivram Patil	PWPI	20,212	44.49%	612
32	Mokhada	35.66%	Malu Hari Veer	INC	12,189	43.13%	Pandurang Ramchandra Patil	PWPI	6,954	24.61%	5,235
33	Murbad	53.73%	Shantaram Gopal Gholap	INC	13,855	43.74%	Mukund Kanu Patil	PWPI	8,705	27.48%	5,150
34	Kalyan	60.82%	Shankarrao Krishnarao Hande	INC	13,744	34.15%	Mukund Vishny Vaze	ABJS	9,632	23.93%	420
35	Ulhasnagar	66.13%	Parcharam Kewalram Ailani (Alias Vidyarthi)	Socialist Party (India)	17,635	39.84%	Newandram Vishindas Gurbani	INC	14,425	32.59%	3,210
Kolaba District
36	Panvel	58.88%	Pratapsinha Vishwasrao Chavan	INC	13,772	34.91%	Keshav Hari Gokhale	PSP	4,701	11.92%	5,084
37	Pen	58.11%	Laxman Shankar Mhatre	INC	19,673	49.44%	Tukaram Hari Vajekar	PWPI	15,326	38.52%	4,347
38	Khalapur	51.96%	Krishna Ramaji Mundhe	PWPI	17,027	51.40%	Govind Sonu Katkari	INC	11,850	35.77%	5,177
39	Alibag	69.05%	Khanvilkar Datajirao Krishnanarao	INC	18,762	51.41%	Datta Narayan Patil	PWPI	13,494	36.98%	5,268
40	Roha	65.09%	Pandurang Ramaji Sanap	PWPI	17,466	47.68%	Yashwant Dwarkanath Deshmukh	INC	15,606	42.60%	1,860
41	Shrivardhan	65.47%	A. R. Antulay	INC	16,684	57.49%	Digambar Vinayak Purohit	PSP	7,475	25.76%	9,209
42	Mangaon	44.27%	Dattatraya Malogi Talegaonkar	INC	13,047	53.33%	Tanaji Ganpat Gaikwa	Independent	5,132	20.98%	7,915
43	Mahad	62.43%	Sakharam Vithoba Salunke	PSP	12,664	37.23%	Shankar Babaji Sawant	INC	12,664	37.23%	0
Poona District
44	Shukrawar Peth	66.64%	Rambhau Vithal Telang	INC	28,434	53.78%	Shreedhar Mahadev Joshi	PSP	19,263	36.43%	9,171
45	Kasba Peth	72.96%	Baburao Narayanrao Sans	INC	27,135	55.04%	Kaluram Udansing Pardeshi	Independent	10,710	21.72%	16,425
46	Shivajinagar	72.74%	Sadashiv Govind Barve	INC	30,306	59.98%	Ramchandra Kashinath Mhalagi	ABJS	14,723	29.14%	15,583
47	Pune Cantonment	53.70%	Krishnarao Tukaram Girme	INC	17,529	53.08%	Jaysing Ganpat Sasane	PSP	6,474	19.61%	11,055
48	Haveli	65.72%	Martand Dhondiba Magar	INC	26,927	51.09%	Ram Dasharath Tupe	PSP	20,124	38.18%	6,803
49	Kirkee	45.94%	Ganpat Narayan Kamble	INC	14,893	50.94%	Ramchandra Giriju Randhir	Independent	2,726	9.32%	12,167
50	Indapur	60.15%	Shankarrao Bajirao Patil	INC	18,676	46.39%	Dinkarrao Shankarrao Patil	PWPI	11,122	27.62%	7,554
51	Baramati	51.96%	Malatibai Madhavrao Shirole	INC	14,751	46.86%	Mansing Murlidhar Tule	PSP	5,553	17.64%	9,198
52	Dhond	31.98%	Vithal Ramchandra Pawar	INC	12,884	56.82%	Maruti Bandu Sawant	RPI	3,428	15.12%	9,456
53	Shirur	48.00%	Raosaheb Baburao Pawar	INC	12,395	46.42%	Shamkant Damodar More	PSP	11,334	42.45%	1,061
54	Junnar	59.95%	Vithalrao Narayanrao Awate	PSP	17,826	44.53%	Shivaji Mahadeo Kale	INC	17,699	44.21%	127
55	Ambegaon	53.10%	Awate Annasaheb Gopalrao	INC	22,111	70.58%	Muruti Shripati Awate	PSP	4,812	15.36%	17,299
56	Khed	43.49%	Vasantrao Marutrao Manjre	INC	19,267	62.86%	Narayan Balwant Ghumatkar	ABJS	5,602	18.28%	13,665
57	Maval	64.50%	Namdeo Sadashiv Mohol	INC	26,247	56.78%	Nathu Baburao Bhegade	ABJS	13,862	29.99%	12,385
58	Bhor	52.79%	Shankar Mahadeo Bhelke	INC	23,543	63.86%	Jaysing Parashuram Mali	Independent	7,890	21.40%	15,653
59	Purandar	60.73%	Dayaneshwar Raghunath Khalre	INC	13,911	39.87%	Vithal Sauloba Deshmukh	Independent	8,361	23.96%	5,550
Ratnagiri District
60	Ratnagiri Khed	51.22%	Hussain Misarikhan Dalwai	INC	19,505	51.33%	Tanaji Balkrishna More	PSP	4,926	12.96%	14,579
61	Dapoli	50.53%	Ramchandra Vithal Bhelose	INC	14,966	55.98%	Sharad Govind Dandekar	ABJS	6,231	23.31%	8,735
62	Guhagar	51.70%	Purushottam Vasudeo Mandlik	PSP	8,232	34.04%	Mahadeo Soma Kesarkar	INC	7,590	31.39%	642
63	Chiplun	58.57%	Abubakarkhan Mahamadkhan Dalwai	PSP	5,909	17.80%	Raghunath Bhavrao Shinde	ABJS	5,317	16.02%	12,543
64	Makhajan	33.94%	Vithal Laxman Reelkar	INC	9,682	42.48%	Shantaram Devram Kenavadekar	ABJS	5,094	22.35%	4,588
65	Sangameshwar	31.15%	Jayaram Balkrishna Shetye Alias Bhai Shetye	PSP	6,211	34.48%	Dhondiram Krishnaji Ghag	INC	5,793	32.16%	418
66	Ratnagiri	52.85%	Shantaram Laxman Peje	INC	16,804	52.65%	Mohan Shankar Todankar	PSP	6,878	21.55%	9,926
67	Lanja	36.96%	Shashishenkar Kashinath Athalye	PSP	9,562	51.62%	Anna Shripat Vishwasrao	INC	4,336	23.41%	5,226
68	Rajapur	45.27%	Sahadev Mukund Thakre	INC	8,408	39.44%	Laxman Rangnath Hatankar	PSP	6,574	30.84%	1,834
69	Malvan	51.14%	Shyam Gangaram Kocharekar	PSP	14,232	50.28%	Narayan Govindrao Prabhugaonkar	INC	8,028	28.36%	6,204
70	Deogad	41.26%	Wamanrao Nagoji Rane	INC	8,616	30.19%	Ramchandra Balkrishna Munja	PSP	8,161	28.59%	455
71	Kankavli	42.31%	Yeshwant Babaji Dalvi	PSP	10,035	39.32%	Bhaskar Balkrishna Sawant	INC	8,679	34.01%	1,356
72	Vengurla	59.61%	Prataprao Deorao Bhonsale	INC	13,349	39.20%	Balasaheb Hanamantrao Khardekar	Independent	9,948	29.21%	3,401
73	Sawantwadi	50.38%	Shivram Sawant Khem Sawant Bhonsale	INC	25,455	80.81%	Laxman Narayan Govekar	Independent	4,978	15.80%	20,477
Kolhapur district
74	Chandgad	63.92%	V. K. Chavan Patil	INC	23,930	59.68%	Ravalnath Bhagoji Madholkar	PWPI	12,447	31.04%	11,483
75	Gadhinglaj	64.26%	Nalawade Pandurang Alias Appasaheb Ramrao	INC	22,074	56.06%	Daynandeo Santram Narvekar	PWPI	10,059	25.55%	12,015
76	Kagal	63.66%	Shamrao Bhivaji Patil	INC	20,739	54.20%	Sadashiv Dadu Mandlik	Independent	12,292	32.12%	8,447
77	Bhudargad	62.53%	Anandrao Kondiba Desai	INC	22,171	60.38%	Kaka Gopala Desai	CPI	10,146	27.63%	12,025
78	Radhanagari	60.59%	Dnyandev Santaram Khandekar	INC	19,476	56.92%	Dinkar Nathaji Nalavade	PWPI	14,742	43.08%	4,734
79	Panhala	51.82%	Sadashiva Daulatrao Patil	PWPI	15,529	54.06%	Babajirao Balasaheb Desai	INC	13,198	45.94%	2,331
80	Shahuwadi	56.41%	Shankarrao Namdeo Patil	PWPI	13,327	36.93%	Vasudeo Govind Shiragaonkar	Independent	1,513	4.19%	7,922
81	Kolhapur	72.19%	Karkhanis T. Rao Sitaram	PWPI	23,984	50.31%	Pandurang Bapurao Salunkhe	INC	19,151	40.17%	4,833
82	Karvir	64.49%	Dinkarrao Vithalrao Mudrale	INC	33,363	73.47%	Ramchandr Ravaji Yadav	Independent	11,198	24.66%	22,165
83	Hatkanangale	67.05%	Keshav Narsinga Ghatage	INC	34,419	70.96%	Madhavrao Ishwarrao Kurane	RPI	11,176	23.04%	23,243
84	Shirol	86.40%	Ratnappa Bharamappa Kumbhar	INC	40,986	68.13%	Satgonda Revgonda Patil	Independent	16,335	27.15%	24,651
Sangli District
85	Jat	53.41%	Tukaram Krishnarao Shendge	INC	28,765	67.56%	Shivaji Ramachandra Shedbale	PWPI	9,861	23.16%	18,904
86	Miraj	72.57%	Gundu Dasharath Patil	INC	39,921	74.76%	Nivrutti Baburao Kalke	CPI	6,041	11.31%	33,880
87	Sangli	78.48%	Bhagwan Dnyandev Suryavanshi	PWPI	6,933	11.00%	Bharamgonda Appuraya Khot	PSP	6,178	9.81%	38,739
88	Tasgaon	80.02%	Dhondiram Yeshwant Patil	INC	33,089	62.01%	Ganpati Dada Lad	PWPI	18,932	35.48%	14,157
89	Khanapur	61.16%	Sampatrao Sitaram Mane	INC	30,767	71.50%	Bhagwan Nanasaheb More	PWPI	7,887	18.33%	22,880
90	Vita	62.29%	Bhagwanrao Lalasaheb Pawar	INC	29,528	65.39%	Piraji Tayappa Madhale	RPI	10,927	24.20%	18,601
91	Walva	82.55%	Rajarambapu Patil	INC	44,345	73.99%	Narayan Dhyanu Patil	PWPI	15,589	26.01%	28,756
92	Shirala	73.16%	Vasantrao Anandrao Naik	INC	35,864	67.99%	Tashwant Chandru Patil	PWPI	11,919	22.60%	23,945
Satara District
93	Karad North	82.02%	Keshav Pataloji Pawar	PWPI	15,231	26.82%	Mahamud Abdul Awte	Independent	697	1.23%	25,482
94	Karad South	70.02%	Vasantrao Alias Dattajirao Keru Patil	PWPI	6,929	16.44%	Ranganath Appa Patil	SWA	1,159	2.75%	26,461
95	Patan	72.47%	Balasaheb Ganpatrao Patankar	PWPI	4,576	9.24%	Vithal Tukaram Ghadge	Independent	1,973	3.98%	38,389
96	Jaoli	70.20%	Bnilare Bhiku Daji	INC	28,423	77.05%	Ganpat Shivram Bhilare	PWPI	5,656	15.33%	22,767
97	Wai	64.64%	Dadasaheb Khasherao Jagtap	INC	27,456	62.29%	Balasaheb Bapusaheb Deshmukh	PWPI	10,684	24.24%	16,772
98	Satara	75.56%	Dhondiram Shidoji Jagtap	INC	35,390	69.00%	Vithalrao Nanasaheb Patil	Independent	12,068	23.53%	23,322
99	Koregaon	65.20%	Tushar Pandurang Pawar	INC	20,609	50.92%	Vithal Pandurang Bhosale	Independent	8,107	20.03%	12,502
100	Khatav	61.42%	Shivajirao Dadasaheb Pawar	INC	24,477	56.58%	Keshav Shankar Patil	PSP	16,205	37.46%	8,272
101	Phaltan	67.55%	Naik Nimbalkar Malojirao Alias Nanasaheb	INC	33,741	74.08%	Haribhau Vithal Nimbalkar	CPI	9,209	20.22%	24,532
102	Man	49.24%	Laxman Babaji Bhingardeve	INC	24,624	78.13%	Khanderao Sakharam Savant	RPI	4,061	12.88%	20,563
Sholapur District
103	Akkalkot	56.88%	Nirmalaraje Vijayasinh Bhosale	INC	27,291	77.82%	Shankareppa Basappa Lodapure	Independent	6,306	17.98%	20,985
104	Solapur South	54.71%	Virupakshappa Guruppa Shivdare	INC	25,277	76.23%	Vishwanath Ramchandra Lad	Independent	6,089	18.36%	19,188
105	North Sholapur	62.36%	Govind Bhaurao Burgute	INC	16,987	45.31%	Vishwasrao Kondiba Phate	PWPI	11,965	31.91%	5,022
106	Barshi	72.52%	Prabhatai Shankarrao Zadbuke	INC	32,757	64.93%	Narshing Tatya Deshmukh	Independent	7,332	14.53%	25,425
107	Solapur City North	63.15%	Yankapa Ramaya Madur	CPI	23,025	44.33%	Keshavlal Virchand Shah	INC	20,301	39.09%	2,724
108	Solapur City South	63.42%	Rajaram Savalaram Dhavale	INC	12,904	32.05%	Rone Bhimrao Laxmanrao	PSP	10,847	26.94%	2,057
109	Pandharpur	64.96%	Audumber Kondiba Patil	INC	28,246	59.34%	Jayawant Ghanashyam More	Independent	13,275	27.89%	14,971
110	Malshiras	73.65%	Shankarrao Mohite-Patil	INC	32,685	59.90%	Shivajirao Bhawanrao Patil	Independent	20,767	38.06%	11,918
111	Sangola	49.38%	Keshavrao Shripatrao Raut	INC	15,743	44.68%	Shivaji Tipanna Bansode	Independent	1,692	4.80%	2,057
112	Mangalwedha	30.50%	Ganpat Laxman Sonwane	INC	14,023	66.09%	Govind Pandurang Magade	RPI	2,716	12.80%	11,307
113	Karmala	59.62%	Pandurang Mahadeo Jagtap	Independent	15,543	36.86%	Namdeo Mahadeo Jagtap	INC	14,300	33.92%	1,243
114	Madha	36.64%	Kashinath Babu Asware	INC	16,659	65.22%	Keru Appa Lankeshwar	RPI	8,078	31.63%	8,581
Ahmednagar District
115	Karjat	53.21%	Eknath Buwasaheb Nimbalkar	INC	21,381	61.39%	Hirabai Prabhakar Bhapkar	Independent	9,230	26.50%	12,151
116	Shrigonda	41.13%	Baburao Mahadeo Bharaskar	INC	12,961	53.74%	Prabhakar Janardhan Rohan	RPI	6,429	26.66%	6,532
117	Pathardi	56.53%	Narayan Ganpat Avhad	CPI	19,723	54.29%	Trimbak Lahanu Garje	INC	16,606	45.71%	3,117
118	Shevgaon	62.82%	Marutraoji Shankarrao Ghule Patil	INC	24,851	60.88%	Ekanath Laxman Bhagwat	Independent	14,027	34.36%	10,824
119	Ahmednagar North	57.37%	Balasaheb Nabaji Nagwade	Independent	19,372	52.14%	Vithalrao Ganpatrao Kute	INC	16,208	43.63%	3,164
120	Ahmednagar South	57.95%	Trimbak Shivram Bharde	INC	17,270	50.51%	Navashervan Navarozaji Sattha	Independent	12,341	36.09%	4,929
121	Parner	50.07%	Dattatraya Koundiram Bhagat	INC	7,800	28.65%	Bhaskar Tukaram Auti	CPI	6,787	24.93%	1,013
122	Rahuri	67.41%	Baburao Bapuji Tanapure	INC	24,482	57.29%	Punjaji Bapu Kadu	CPI	15,875	37.15%	8,607
123	Shirdi	71.71%	Karbhari Bhimaji Rohamare	INC	28,679	63.50%	Mohanrao Abasaheb Gade	Independent	16,486	36.50%	12,193
124	Shrirampur	52.72%	Baburao Sawleram Chaturbhuj	INC	19,619	59.72%	Waman Damodhar Wakchaure	RPI	8,769	26.69%	10,850
125	Sangamner	63.59%	Datta Appaji Deshmukh	Independent	15,907	37.59%	Bhaskar Govindrao Durve	PSP	9,558	22.59%	947
126	Nagar–Akola	52.88%	Yeshwant Sakharam Bahangare	INC	13,589	37.21%	Barku Alias Bapurao Krishnaji Deshmukh	CPI	12,421	34.01%	1,168
Nashik District
127	Nasik	60.64%	Vasant Narayan Naik	INC	20,371	49.58%	Ramchandra Jagannath Pande	Independent	7,657	18.64%	12,714
128	Bhagur	52.67%	Dattaraya Tulsiram Kale	INC	16,289	58.31%	Janardan Sambhaji Unawane	RPI	8,462	30.29%	7,827
129	Igatpuri	52.56%	Mulchand Shrimal Gothi	INC	12,829	41.58%	Shabaji Ramchandra Khatale	CPI	11,808	38.27%	1,021
130	Kalwan	39.68%	Dongar Rama More	INC	11,689	43.24%	Ramdan Pandu Bagul	Independent	4,660	17.24%	7,029
131	Dindori	81.28%	Raghunath Gopalrao Gunjal	INC	14,063	39.16%	Fakirrao Sakharam Dawakhar	CPI	11,290	31.44%	2,773
132	Peint	41.65%	Kacharu Bhau Raut	INC	9,475	36.56%	Sitaram Sayaji Bhoye	Independent	8,308	32.06%	1,167
133	Malegaon	59.86%	Haroon Ahmed Ansari	INC	24,011	39.21%	A. Moulavi M. Usman Nihal	PSP	22,962	37.50%	1,049
134	Nandgaon	66.02%	Vyankatrao Bhausaheb Hire	INC	30,651	60.24%	Shivram Dadaji Hire	PSP	13,912	27.34%	16,739
135	Baglan	75.09%	Pandit Dharma Sonawane	INC	31,383	63.18%	Narayan Mansaram Sonawane	RPI	8,760	17.63%	22,623
136	Yevla	65.35%	Hirubhau Manaku Gavali	INC	26,040	56.22%	Madhav Bayaji Gayakawad	CPI	10,820	23.36%	15,220
137	Niphad	64.61%	Dattatraye Bhikaji Patil	INC	22,312	54.75%	Narayan Lakhuji Shinde	CPI	11,952	29.33%	10,360
138	Sinnar	66.63%	Shankar Balaji Waje	INC	20,027	47.86%	Gangadhar Wamanrao Chavanke	CPI	16,967	40.55%	3,060
Dhulia-Nandurbar District
139	Nandurbar	61.08%	Gajmal Tulshiram Patil	INC	23,697	55.56%	Shankarrao Chinduji Bedse	Independent	10,688	25.06%	13,009
140	Sakri	50.41%	Gokul Rupla Gavit	INC	20,032	51.97%	Hiraman Bhavadu Pawar	CPI	11,390	29.55%	8,642
141	Navapur	46.64%	Dharma Jayaram Kokani	INC	6,414	33.91%	Sattarsingh Sona Vasave	Independent	5,136	27.15%	1,278
142	Talode	41.95%	Digambar Narshi Padvi	INC	11,998	61.13%	Ramu Dharma Padvi	ABJS	4,064	20.71%	7,934
143	Shirpur	59.10%	Vyankatrao Tanaji Dhobi	INC	24,753	61.47%	Prahladrao Madhavrao Patil	ABJS	10,916	27.11%	13,837
144	Akrani	40.21%	Chandrasing Dhanaka Bhandari	INC	12,541	49.64%	Parshi Tetya Pawara	ABJS	4,525	17.91%	8,016
145	Sindkheda	60.67%	Narayanrao Sahadeorao Patil	INC	33,584	67.96%	Baburao Nabaji Desai	PSP	6,045	12.23%	27,539
146	Dhulia South	66.03%	Bhagwatiprasad Rambharos Pande	INC	21,278	48.33%	Ramdas Bhagwan Choudhary	Independent	13,903	31.58%	7,375
147	Dhulia North	53.86%	Chandrakant Nandeo Patil	INC	25,381	62.69%	Zulal Bhilajirao Patil	PWPI	7,634	18.86%	17,747
Jalgoan District
148	Chopda	65.28%	Deorao Madhavrao Nikam	INC	30,352	67.67%	Dasharath Hiraman Tayade	PWPI	6,818	15.20%	23,534
149	Amalner	56.27%	Shahjahankhan Jalamkhan Tadvi	INC	21,817	59.86%	Anilkumar Prashi Chavan	ABJS	6,018	16.51%	15,799
150	Parola	60.69%	Gulabrao Narayanrao Pawar	INC	22,750	51.41%	Shrinivas Chunilal Agarwal	ABJS	10,065	22.74%	12,685
151	Chalisgaon	63.12%	Motiram Shamrao Suryananshi	INC	23,368	55.18%	Deoram Ramji Chavan	PSP	10,687	25.23%	12,681
152	Pachora	62.51%	Supadu Bhadu Patil	INC	26,413	64.60%	Onkar Narayan Wagh	PSP	10,759	26.32%	15,654
153	Jamner	55.93%	Abaji Nana Patil	INC	28,009	72.32%	Mahadeo Ramchandra Lale	Independent	8,165	21.08%	19,844
154	Erandol	63.76%	Digambar Shankar Patil	INC	22,571	51.64%	Yogarajasinha Shankarsinha Parihar	Independent	11,955	27.35%	10,616
155	Jalgaon	58.49%	Pratibha Narayanrao Patil	INC	19,524	55.07%	Bhalerao Sadashiv Narayan	CPI	8,043	22.69%	11,481
156	Bhusawal	59.59%	Dattatraya Senu Bhirud	INC	18,807	51.63%	Vithal Kamji Choudhari	PSP	9,058	24.86%	9,749
157	Yawal	61.82%	Ramabai Narayan Deshpande	INC	15,809	42.85%	Ganpat Bhavadu Mahajan	PSP	15,246	41.32%	563
158	Raver	78.19%	Mahukar Dhanaji Chaudhari	INC	28,848	59.72%	Gajananrao Raghunathrao Garud	PSP	18,169	37.61%	10,679
Buldana District
159	Edlabad	56.64%	Hiralal Indal Kalyani	INC	24,014	64.02%	Bhalerao Trambak Senu	RPI	7,666	20.44%	16,348
160	Chikhali	80.35%	Santoshrao Narayan Patil	INC	34,254	55.75%	Keshaorao Jaiwantrao Bahekar	ABJS	18,154	29.55%	16,100
161	Buldhana	70.08%	Indirabai Ramrao Kotambkar	INC	18,266	41.41%	Damodhar Zipra Varhade	ABJS	9,465	21.46%	8,801
162	Malkapur	73.33%	Bhiku Phakim Patil	INC	22,808	43.85%	Waman Tukaram Naphade	ABJS	15,281	29.38%	7,527
163	Jalamb	70.39%	Kashirao Raibhan Patil	PWPI	25,207	46.97%	Tulsiram Pandhari Dhokne	INC	21,774	40.57%	3,433
164	Khamgaon	74.15%	Govinddas Fatanlal Bhatiya	INC	33,288	55.85%	Tukaram Ganpat Khumkar	Independent	21,319	35.77%	11,969
165	Mehkar	76.17%	Annasaheb Deshmukh Alias Shankarrao	INC	25,957	51.69%	Kisan Tukaram Sangle	Independent	18,803	37.44%	7,154
166	Janephal	50.04%	Balwanta Piraji Wankhede	INC	16,920	44.14%	Mahadu Yeshwanta Bhalerao	ABJS	7,369	19.22%	9,551
Akola District
167	Washim	69.62%	Ramrao Gopalrao Zanak	INC	26,891	61.84%	Dattatraya Krishnarao Abooj	Independent	7,832	18.01%	19,059
168	Gowardhan	37.02%	Rambahau Chinkaji Salve	INC	10,206	36.52%	Kachruji Muadhaji Jumde	RPI	6,388	22.86%	3,818
169	Mangrulpir	60.79%	Shanta Raghunath Page	INC	18,055	48.56%	Tukaram Marotrao Nikam	Independent	12,552	33.76%	5,503
170	Murtizapur	68.43%	Kusumtai Wamanrao Korpe	INC	30,177	60.33%	Pandurang Goturam Athawale	RPI	9,908	19.81%	20,269
171	Borgaon Manju	59.97%	Dagad Zangoji Palaspagar	INC	26,786	58.26%	Shriram Daulat Gawai	RPI	12,857	27.97%	13,929
172	Akole	68.72%	Madhusudhan Atmaram Vairale	INC	18,452	44.59%	Harihar Krishnarao Puradu Pandhya	ABJS	9,258	22.37%	9,194
173	Balapur	69.18%	Shriram Haribhau Mankar	Independent	25,173	54.35%	Kazi Syed Gayasuddin Syed Nasiruddin	INC	19,561	42.23%	5,612
174	Akot	77.00%	Gopalrao Bajirao Khedkar	INC	26,603	45.77%	Devidas Moriti Korale	PWPI	13,967	24.03%	12,636
175	Daryapur	86.30%	Jagannath Deorao Patil	RPI	32,181	54.55%	Narayanrao Uttamrao Deshmukh	INC	25,208	42.73%	6,973
Amravathi District
176	Ashti	72.85%	Ramdas Gangaramji Sonone	INC	24,396	46.92%	Krishnarao Bhanuji Shrungare	RPI	22,833	43.91%	1,563
177	Melghat	68.17%	Mamraj Jagannath Khandelwal	Independent	29,403	55.41%	Girjabai W/O Shanharrao Watane	INC	23,661	44.59%	5,742
178	Amravati	70.60%	Umerlalji Mathuradas Kedia	INC	27,838	52.21%	Gopal Dattatraya Kaloti	Independent	20,878	39.16%	6,960
179	Badnera	69.07%	Purushottam K. Deshmukh	INC	21,025	40.64%	Sukhadeorao Phagoji Tidke	RPI	15,941	30.82%	5,084
180	Chandur	75.99%	Bhaurao Gulabrao Jadhao	INC	31,025	51.12%	Wamanrao Deshmukh Alias Sudan Dattatraya	CPI	19,052	31.39%	11,973
181	Achalpur	79.75%	Amasaheb Sadashivrao Watene	Independent	30,184	50.52%	Krishnarao Gulabrao Deshmukh	INC	28,056	46.96%	2,128
182	Morshi	80.77%	Partapsinh Shankarrao	Independent	35,464	58.66%	Laxmanrao Raghunathrao Tarar	INC	21,677	35.85%	13,787
Nagpur District
183	Katol	79.81%	Shankarrao Daulatrao Gedam	INC	25,511	47.31%	Jiwanlal Sawangidas Chandak	Independent	25,101	46.55%	410
184	Kalmeshwar	71.32%	Wankhede Sheshrao Krishnarao	INC	26,054	51.23%	Indubhushan Bhagwantrao Bhingare	Independent	16,467	32.38%	9,587
185	Savner	61.27%	Narendra Mahipati Tidke	INC	21,413	51.80%	Ramji Chimnaji Naik	Independent	9,771	23.64%	11,642
186	Ramtek	52.89%	Pathan Mohammad Abdullakhan	INC	11,840	34.65%	Vishnu Mahadeo Dhoble	Independent	8,283	24.24%	3,557
187	Nagpur I	73.03%	Vinayak Sakharam Dandekar	Independent	30,643	46.38%	Maangopal Jodharaj Agarwal	INC	15,191	22.99%	15,452
188	Nagpur II	75.68%	Dhondbaji Dashrath Hadav	Independent	33,176	53.95%	Pratapsinhrao Laxmanrao Bhonsle	INC	16,175	26.30%	17,001
189	Nagpur	67.57%	Shusilabai Balraj	INC	12,859	29.58%	Ardhendu Bhushan Hemendra Kumar Bardhan	CPI	12,701	29.22%	158
190	Nagpur III	70.68%	D. P. Meshram	RPI	22,353	36.62%	Panjabrao Hukum Shambhakar	Independent	19,428	31.83%	2,925
191	Umred	55.64%	Damu Sadashiv Tarnekar	INC	13,428	32.73%	Rajaram Laxman Mahale	Independent	7,398	18.03%	6,030
192	Kamthi	69.14%	Anantram Dayal Choudhari	INC	20,036	42.38%	Bhalchandra Haribhau Sontakhe	RPI	14,986	31.70%	5,050
Bhandara District
193	Bhandara	68.39%	Dada Da Jibaji Dhote	INC	17,855	42.15%	Sadanand Mangalram Ramteke	RPI	11,364	26.83%	6,491
194	Adyar	61.82%	Aba Dhondu Gosawi	RPI	15,791	40.54%	Prabhavatibai Kashinath Gajabhiye	INC	15,583	40.01%	208
195	Tumsar	58.90%	Ram Bakaramji Lanjewar	INC	15,453	35.83%	Kesjaprap Losamrap Kawale	PWPI	11,040	25.60%	4,413
196	Tirora	74.87%	Shaligram Ramratan Dixit	INC	18,425	38.80%	Narayan Hari Kjumbhare	RPI	15,564	32.78%	2,861
197	Gondiya	68.82%	Nanoharbhai Bababhai Patel	INC	24,118	48.79%	Gopalnarayan Shivavinayak Bajpayee	PSP	22,355	45.22%	1,763
198	Goregaon	57.24%	Puranlal Dharmabhan Rahangdale	PSP	19,271	50.62%	Pannalal Biharilal Dube	INC	15,303	40.20%	3,968
199	Amgaon	35.42%	Narayan Mohani Bahekar	PSP	9,631	36.96%	Laxmanrao Mankar	ABJS	5,260	20.19%	4,371
200	Sakoli	71.62%	Adkuji Sonuji Paulsagade	INC	18,535	34.87%	Shyamrao Pagaji Kapgate	ABJS	14,324	26.95%	4,211
201	Sadak Arjuni	47.11%	Shrawan Mangruji Kanhekar	INC	13,111	33.09%	Maroti Waktu Sahkare	RPI	12,224	30.85%	887
Chanda District
202	Bhadrawati	68.01%	Ramchandra Janardhan Deotale	INC	24,414	45.24%	Vithal Rao Laxman Rao Deotale	PSP	22,604	41.89%	1,810
203	Chimur	70.88%	Marotirao D. Tumpalliwar	INC	23,479	49.41%	Balaji Deorao Borkar	ABJS	9,024	18.99%	14,455
204	Bramhapuri	59.31%	Govinda Bijaji Meshram	INC	23,114	58.68%	Namdeorao Vishnuji Nagdovate	RPI	12,419	31.53%	10,695
205	Armori	58.91%	Mhashakhetri Jagannath Temsaji	INC	23,500	61.53%	Kosare Hiraman Lahanu	RPI	14,692	38.47%	8,808
206	Sironcha	67.69%	Vishweshwarrao Dharmarrao Atram	Independent	24,955	64.77%	Murli Manoharrao Sriniwas Venkat	INC	6,915	17.95%	18,040
207	Dhanora	48.79%	Raja Fatelalshah Rajaranshah Sayam	Independent	18,466	53.70%	Narayansinh Sampatsinh Weakey	PSP	7,751	22.54%	10,715
208	Saoli	75.57%	Marotrao Kannamwar	INC	23,696	50.78%	Damodhar Laxman Kale	Independent	22,968	49.22%	728
209	Rajura	59.64%	Vithalrao Laxmanrao Dhote	INC	22,818	43.98%	Yadaorao Ramchandrarao Dhote	Independent	22,745	43.84%	73
210	Chanda	68.76%	Ramchandrarao Rajeshwarrao Ptdukhe	Independent	21,708	44.88%	Lanmanrao Krishnaji Wasekar	INC	14,099	29.15%	7,609
Wardha District
211	Hinganghat	76.26%	Vinayak Madhaorao Chaudhary	Independent	37,523	57.52%	Keshaorao Motiram Zade	INC	24,847	38.09%	12,676
212	Wardha	66.62%	Bapuraoji Marotrao Deshmukh	INC	22,275	47.35%	Ramchandra Marotrao Ghangare	CPI	11,579	24.61%	10,696
213	Pulgaon	66.87%	Shankarrao Vithlrao Sonawane	INC	20,621	42.74%	Dharmdas Sakharam	RPI	16,044	33.26%	4,577
214	Arvi	75.68%	Narayanrao Rajeramji Kale	Independent	26,337	39.23%	Mahadeo Tukaram Thakre	INC	25,156	37.47%	1,181
Yeotmal District
215	Wani	68.18%	Vithalrao Yeshwantrao Gohokar	INC	27,514	59.03%	Namdeo Narayan Kale	CPI	13,287	28.51%	14,227
216	Yelabara	57.26%	Mahadeo Baliram Khandate	INC	26,975	67.85%	Sukhdeo Pundlik Wooike	Independent	10,272	25.84%	16,703
217	Kelapur	75.65%	Tryambak Dattatraya Deshmukh	INC	25,324	55.70%	Prayagrao Bajirao Deshmukh	Independent	16,479	36.24%	8,845
218	Yavatmal	71.58%	Chhabutai Uttamrao Dahake	INC	18,128	41.41%	Baburao Kashinath Yerawar	Independent	4,793	10.95%	13,335
219	Darwha	75.25%	Ali Hasan Jiwabhai Mamdani	INC	27,582	54.81%	Hanawantgir Mahadeogir	Independent	11,701	23.25%	15,881
220	Digras	78.80%	Madhaorao Baburao Mahindre	INC	24,660	46.03%	Govindrao Punjaji Buchake	PWPI	22,668	42.31%	1,992
221	Pusad	87.18%	Nalinibai Godhajirao Mukhare	Independent	19,402	32.38%	Babarao Raoji Lokhande	RPI	2,287	3.82%	17,544
222	Umarkhed	75.69%	Ramchandra Namdeo Shingankar	INC	27,748	62.97%	Vishwasrao Sukaji Kambale	Independent	9,653	21.90%	18,095
Nanded District
223	Kinwat	64.12%	Uttamrao Baliram Rathod	INC	30,368	66.17%	Vithalrao Raghoji	PWPI	15,529	33.83%	14,839
224	Hadgaon	58.75%	Bhimrao Keshavrao Deshmukh	INC	21,742	48.70%	Nagorao Hanmantrao	CPI	13,246	29.67%	8,496
225	Nanded	58.06%	Farook Pasha Makhdum Pasha	INC	23,929	57.73%	Vithalrao Devidasrao Deshpande	CPI	12,620	30.45%	11,309
226	Dharmabad	52.95%	Chaudhan Shankarao Bhaurao	INC	25,065	60.07%	Konbderao Manoharrao	Independent	10,366	24.84%	14,699
227	Biloli	48.13%	Venkat Rao Baba Rao	INC	21,077	56.43%	Shivraya Bhim Rao	PSP	9,867	26.41%	11,210
228	Mukhed	35.88%	Subhash Piraji Sabne	INC	19,652	67.04%	Laxaya Maraya	RPI	4,836	16.50%	14,816
229	Kandhar	42.86%	Keshavrao Shankarrao Dhondge	PWPI	17,611	52.90%	Sahebrao Sakoji	INC	10,493	31.52%	7,118
Osmanabad District
230	Ahmedpur	55.05%	Mahalingappa Alias Appasaheb Baslingappa	INC	25,068	58.71%	Vithalrao Balkrishnarao	CPI	17,631	41.29%	7,437
231	Udgir	48.85%	Vithalrao Bapurao	INC	21,494	69.83%	Kisan Sakharam	RPI	7,616	24.74%	13,878
232	Nilanga	74.04%	Shivajirao Patil Nilangekar	INC	33,125	57.23%	Shripatrao Gyanurao Solunke	PWPI	24,756	42.77%	8,369
233	Latur	62.29%	Keshavrao Sonawane	INC	23,049	57.15%	Ramchandra Govind	Independent	14,036	34.80%	9,013
234	Ausa	69.99%	Mallanath Gundanath	PWPI	25,296	50.42%	Devisingh Vanetsingh Chauhan	INC	24,872	49.58%	424
235	Omerga	62.41%	Vijaysing Shivram	PWPI	18,722	45.79%	Tatayarao Madhavrao	INC	17,846	43.65%	876
236	Tuljapur	48.94%	Sahebrao Dada	INC	20,095	53.85%	Devidas Nagoba	PWPI	15,404	41.28%	4,691
237	Osmanabad	57.24%	Vishwasrao Ganpatrao	INC	17,500	48.50%	Narsingrao Balbhimrao	PWPI	16,490	45.70%	1,010
238	Paranda	54.04%	Krishnaji Bajirao	PWPI	16,085	42.31%	Tarabai Mansinghrao	INC	14,188	37.32%	1,897
239	Kallam	49.09%	Pralhadrao Sopan	INC	14,643	45.08%	Vithal Limbaji	RPI	12,633	38.90%	2,010
176	Ashti	72.85%	Ramdas Gangaramji Sonone	INC	24,396	46.92%	Krishnarao Bhanuji Shrungare	RPI	22,833	43.91%	1,563
Bhir District
241	Bhir	47.34%	Kashinath Tatyaba	CPI	18,609	51.90%	Shantabai Ratanlal	INC	13,186	36.78%	5,423
242	Georai	42.78%	Sayajirao Trayambakrao	INC	13,408	49.90%	Shivajirao Trimbakrao	CPI	12,329	45.89%	1,079
243	Manjlegaon	39.53%	Sripad Rao Kadam	INC	13,881	54.44%	Gangadharappa Burande	CPI	11,618	45.56%	2,263
244	Chausala	35.57%	Bhaurao Bhagujirao	INC	14,113	51.47%	Baburao Narsing Rao	PWPI	8,167	29.79%	5,946
245	Kaij	31.41%	Govind Rao Gaikwad	INC	11,843	60.20%	Babu Rao Abarao	RPI	4,171	21.20%	7,672
246	Renapur	49.31%	Ganpathi Anna	CPI	18,779	58.60%	Wamanrao Deshmukh	INC	13,269	41.40%	5,510
Parbhani District
247	Pathri	41.60%	Babarao Sopan Naik	PWPI	13,758	44.99%	Sakhram Gopalrao Nakhate	INC	13,616	44.53%	142
248	Gangakhed	34.85%	Devrao Mandeo	INC	13,637	60.64%	Trimbak Marothi	RPI	7,868	34.99%	5,769
249	Parbhani	49.66%	Sheshrao Deshmukh	PWPI	17,215	51.28%	Ambadasrao Ganeshrao	INC	13,179	39.26%	4,036
250	Basmath	37.55%	Rangrao Parashram	INC	14,847	63.18%	Kamaji Jalbaji	PWPI	5,034	21.42%	9,813
251	Hingoli	50.70%	Narayan Rao Limbaji Rao	INC	19,892	52.41%	Chandrakant Ramkrishna Patil	PSP	9,012	23.74%	10,880
252	Kalamnuri	45.14%	Surajmal Marauam	INC	16,663	59.51%	Pandit Badrinath	Independent	7,831	27.97%	8,832
253	Partur	43.06%	Bhagwanrao Daulatrao	INC	16,032	53.64%	Ankushrao Venkatrao Ghare	PWPI	11,923	39.89%	4,109
Aurangabad District
254	Jintur	36.44%	Anandrao Wamanrao Deshmukh	INC	14,097	48.40%	Hariharrao Anandrao	PWPI	8,818	30.28%	5,279
255	Ambad	36.27%	Nanasaheb Sawalaram	INC	10,838	50.20%	Jagannath Alias Jaiwant S/O Kundalik Rao	CPI	6,405	29.67%	4,433
256	Jalna	34.26%	Dattatray Rao Khanderao Deshpande	INC	11,524	59.87%	Bhanudas Gangaram	Independent	4,239	22.02%	7,285
257	Badnapur	38.17%	Dhakaleshwar Makaji	INC	16,357	64.87%	T. G. Kharat	RPI	8,859	35.13%	7,498
258	Bhokardan	58.81%	Bhaurao Narsingrao	PWPI	32,161	62.32%	Bhagwantrao Gambhirrao	INC	15,899	30.81%	16,262
259	Aurangabad	56.00%	Zakaria Rafiq Balimy	INC	18,767	55.89%	Govinddas Mannulal	Independent	14,813	44.11%	3,954
260	Paithan	41.56%	Kalyanrao Pandhorinath	INC	16,980	59.65%	Kashinath (Babanrao ) Pralhadrao Kulkarni	PSP	8,293	29.13%	8,687
261	Gangapur	53.26%	Yamajirao Mhatarrao	INC	20,600	60.20%	Baburao Dattatraya Pawar	CPI	10,590	30.95%	10,010
262	Vaijapur	49.00%	Girjabai Machhindranath	INC	23,830	65.14%	Kishore Pawar Rameshwar Pawar	PSP	10,659	29.14%	13,171
263	Kannad	53.02%	Kakasaheb Bhikanrao	INC	21,926	53.51%	Kanhiram Gurudayal	PSP	6,959	16.98%	14,967
264	Sillod	50.47%	Baburao Janglu	INC	26,171	67.76%	Karuna Chandragupta	CPI	9,191	23.80%	16,980
