= Ratnagiri Khed Assembly constituency =

Constituency of the Maharashtra legislative assembly in India

Ratnagiri Khed
- Former constituency for the Maharashtra Legislative Assembly

Constituency details
- Country: India
- Region: Western India
- State: Maharashtra
- Established: 1961
- Abolished: 1964
- Total electors: 67,449
- Reservation: None

Ratnagiri Khed Assembly constituency was an assembly constituency in the India state of Maharashtra. After 1964 Delimitation act, it was merged to Khed Alandi and Khed.

== Members of the Legislative Assembly ==
| Election | Member | Party |
|---|---|---|
| 1962 | Hussain Misarikhan Dalwai | Indian National Congress |

== Election results ==
=== Assembly Election 1962 ===
1962 Maharashtra Legislative Assembly election : Ratnagiri Khed
| Party | Candidate | Votes | % | ±% |
|---|---|---|---|---|
| INC | Hussain Misarikhan Dalwai | 19,505 | 51.33% | New |
| PSP | Tanaji Balkrishna More | 4,926 | 12.96% | New |
| RPI | Jagannath Shivaram Patane | 3,698 | 9.73% | New |
| Independent | Prabhakar Ramchandra Ambre | 3,266 | 8.60% | New |
| ABJS | Dayanand Ramaji Mhapadi | 3,155 | 8.30% | New |
| Margin of victory | | 14,579 | 38.37% | |
| Turnout | | 37,996 | 51.22% | |
| Registered electors | | 67,449 | | |
| INC win (new seat) | | | | |
