= Nagpur III Assembly constituency =

Nagpur III
- Former constituency for the Maharashtra Legislative Assembly

Constituency details
- Country: India
- Region: Western India
- State: Maharashtra
- Established: 1961
- Abolished: 1967
- Total electors: 89,458
- Reservation: SC

Nagpur III Assembly constituency was an assembly constituency in the India state of Maharashtra.

== Members of the Legislative Assembly ==
Election	Member	Party
1962	D. P. Meshram	Republican Party of India
1965 By-election	Premnath Rishi Wasnik	Indian National Congress

== Election results ==
=== Assembly By-election 1965 ===
1965 Maharashtra Legislative Assembly by-election : Nagpur III
Party	Candidate	Votes	%	±%
INC	Premnath Rishi Wasnik	22,357		
RPI	B.U.Wahane	20,251		
Margin of victory		2,106		
INC gain from RPI		Swing		

=== Assembly Election 1962 ===
1962 Maharashtra Legislative Assembly election : Nagpur III
Party	Candidate	Votes	%	±%
RPI	D. P. Meshram	22,353	36.62%	New
Independent	Panjabrao Hukum Shambhakar	19,428	31.83%	New
INC	Premnath Rishi Wasnik	16,642	27.27%	New
ABJS	Motiram Chandrabhan Chapke	2,286	3.75%	New
Margin of victory		2,925	4.79%	
Turnout		63,232	70.68%	
Total valid votes		61,035		
Registered electors		89,458		
RPI win (new seat)				
