= Dhobitalao Assembly constituency =

Constituency of the Maharashtra legislative assembly in India

Dhobitalao
- Former constituency for the Maharashtra Legislative Assembly

Constituency details
- Country: India
- Region: Western India
- State: Maharashtra
- Established: 1957
- Abolished: 1972
- Total electors: 72,905

Dhobitalao Assembly constituency was an assembly constituency in the India state of Maharashtra.

== Members of the Legislative Assembly ==
Election	Member	Party
1957	Narola Kailasnarayan Shivnarayan	Indian National Congress
1962	Narola Kailasnarayan Shivnarayan	Indian National Congress
1967	Popat Mohanlal Bhavanbhai	Indian National Congress
1972	Popat Mohanlal Bhavanbhai	Indian National Congress

== Election results ==
=== Assembly Election 1972 ===
1972 Maharashtra Legislative Assembly election : Dhobitalao
Party	Candidate	Votes	%	±%
INC	Popat Mohanlal Bhavanbhai	25,259	60.10%	▲15.05
ABJS	Vinod Chhajuram Gupta	8,853	21.06%	▲12.10
INC(O)	Rajda R. Gokuldas	6,627	15.77%	New
Margin of victory		16,406	39.03%	▲23.13
Turnout		42,031	56.51%	▼8.97
Registered electors		72,905		▼1.89
INC hold		Swing	▲15.05	

=== Assembly Election 1967 ===
1967 Maharashtra Legislative Assembly election : Dhobitalao
Party	Candidate	Votes	%	±%
INC	Popat Mohanlal Bhavanbhai	22,298	45.04%	▼18.81
SSP	A. J. Shela	14,426	29.14%	New
SWA	M. M. Chinai	5,213	10.53%	New
ABJS	B. S. Gupta	4,439	8.97%	▲5.21
PSP	Babubhai Manilal Choksi	1,420	2.87%	New
Margin of victory		7,872	15.90%	▼32.41
Turnout		49,504	64.32%	▲11.97
Registered electors		74,308		▲35.46
INC hold		Swing	▼18.81	

=== Assembly Election 1962 ===
1962 Maharashtra Legislative Assembly election : Dhobitalao
Party	Candidate	Votes	%	±%
INC	Shivarayan Kailas	19,144	63.85%	New
Independent	Marutirao Namdeo Tanpure	4,661	15.55%	New
Independent	Babubhai Manilal Choksi	3,798	12.67%	New
ABJS	Arvindchandra Ambalal Trivedi	1,127	3.76%	New
Margin of victory		14,483	48.31%	
Turnout		29,981	52.37%	
Registered electors		54,857		
INC win (new seat)				
