= Dhanora Assembly constituency =

Constituency of the Maharashtra legislative assembly in India

Dhanora
- Former constituency for the Maharashtra Legislative Assembly

Constituency details
- Country: India
- Region: Western India
- State: Maharashtra
- Established: 1961
- Abolished: 1964
- Total electors: 60,356
- Reservation: ST

Dhanora Assembly constituency was an assembly constituency in the India state of Maharashtra.

== Members of the Legislative Assembly ==
Election	Member	Party
1962	Raja Fatelalshah Rajaranshah Sayam	Independent politician

== Election results ==
=== Assembly Election 1962 ===
1962 Maharashtra Legislative Assembly election : Dhanora
Party	Candidate	Votes	%	±%
Independent	Raja Fatelalshah Rajaranshah Sayam	18,466	53.70%	New
PSP	Narayansinh Sampatsinh Weakey	7,751	22.54%	New
INC	Kirtimantrao Bhujangrao Atram	3,233	9.40%	New
Margin of victory		10,715	31.16%	
Turnout		34,387	48.79%	
Registered electors		60,356		
Independent win (new seat)				
