= Kirkee Assembly constituency =

Constituency of the Maharashtra legislative assembly in India

Kirkee
- Former constituency for the Maharashtra Legislative Assembly

Constituency details
- Country: India
- Region: Western India
- State: Maharashtra
- Established: 1961
- Abolished: 1964
- Total electors: 59,453
- Reservation: SC

Kirkee Assembly constituency was an assembly constituency in the India state of Maharashtra.

== Members of the Legislative Assembly ==
Election	Member	Party
1962	Ganpat Narayan Kamble	Indian National Congress

== Election results ==
=== Assembly Election 1962 ===
1962 Maharashtra Legislative Assembly election : Kirkee
Party	Candidate	Votes	%	±%
INC	Ganpat Narayan Kamble	14,893	50.94%	New
Independent	Ramchandra Giriju Randhir	2,726	9.32%	New
Independent	Dadu Bhimji Sonawane	2,692	9.21%	New
Independent	Thasen Raghoba Pandale	2,338	8.00%	New
RPI	Janardan Sadashiv Ranpise	1,792	6.13%	New
Independent	Shewantabai Purshottam Chaura	1,354	4.63%	New
ABJS	Deoram Genba Abnave	1,120	3.83%	New
Margin of victory		12,167	41.62%	
Turnout		29,236	45.94%	
Registered electors		59,453		
INC win (new seat)				
