= Love Grove Assembly constituency =

Constituency of the Maharashtra legislative assembly in India

Love Grove
- Former constituency for the Maharashtra Legislative Assembly

Constituency details
- Country: India
- Region: Western India
- State: Maharashtra
- Established: 1962
- Abolished: 1978
- Total electors: 109,472

Love Grove Assembly constituency was an assembly constituency in the India state of Maharashtra.

== Members of the Legislative Assembly ==
Election	Member	Party
1962	Puna Tabha Patel	Indian National Congress
1967	Puna Tabha Patel	Indian National Congress
1972	Ramchander A. Khaire	Indian National Congress

== Election results ==
=== Assembly Election 1972 ===
1972 Maharashtra Legislative Assembly election : Love Grove
Party	Candidate	Votes	%	±%
INC	Ramchander A. Khaire	46,402	64.62%	▲25.73
SS	Narendra Devdas Jadhav	10,990	15.31%	New
CPI	Hari Punjaji Jadhav	5,266	7.33%	New
INC(O)	Raghunath N. Chavan	2,947	4.10%	New
RPI(K)	Ram Aurangabadkar	2,774	3.86%	New
CPI(M)	S. Ramachandra More	1,244	1.73%	New
Margin of victory		35,412	49.32%	▲48.99
Turnout		71,806	63.60%	▲0.09
Registered electors		109,472		▲13.67
INC hold		Swing	▲25.73	

=== Assembly Election 1967 ===
1967 Maharashtra Legislative Assembly election : Love Grove
Party	Candidate	Votes	%	±%
INC	Puna Tabha Patel	24,532	38.89%	▼5.06
RPI	Arjun Ramchandra Alekar	24,324	38.56%	▲4.93
ABJS	H. L. Nagaonkar	6,107	9.68%	▲1.87
Independent	R. G. Padarath	4,973	7.88%	New
Margin of victory		208	0.33%	▼9.99
Turnout		63,079	62.24%	▲6.42
Registered electors		96,305		▲1.66
INC hold		Swing	▼5.06	

=== Assembly Election 1962 ===
1962 Maharashtra Legislative Assembly election : Love Grove
Party	Candidate	Votes	%	±%
INC	Puna Tabha Patel	24,598	43.95%	New
RPI	Palji Hamabhai Boricha	18,823	33.63%	New
Independent	Arjun Ramchandra Alekar	6,287	11.23%	New
ABJS	Bhikaji Babaji Pawar	4,374	7.81%	New
Margin of victory		5,775	10.32%	
Turnout		55,972	57.44%	
Registered electors		94,737		
INC win (new seat)				
