= Mangrulpir Assembly constituency =

Constituency of the Maharashtra legislative assembly in India

Mangrulpir
- Former constituency for the Maharashtra Legislative Assembly

Constituency details
- Country: India
- Region: Western India
- State: Maharashtra
- Lok Sabha constituency: Washim
- Established: 1952
- Abolished: 2008
- Total electors: 205,179

Mangrulpir Assembly constituency was an assembly constituency in the India state of Maharashtra.

== Members of the Legislative Assembly ==
Election	Member	Party
1952	Babarao Anandrao Deshmukh	Indian National Congress
1957	Biyani Brijlal Nandlal	Indian National Congress
1962	Shanta Raghunath Page	Indian National Congress
1967	C. U. Raghuwanshi	Republican Party of India
1972	Gajadhar Ramsing Rathod	Indian National Congress
1978	Anantkumar Kishanrao Patil	Peasants and Workers Party of India
1980	Gajadhar Ramsing Rathod	Indian National Congress
1985	Rathod Devisin Thanwara	Indian National Congress
1990	Subhash Pandharinath Thakre	Independent politician
1995	Gajadhar Ramsing Rathod	Independent politician
1999	Subhash Pandharinath Thakre	Nationalist Congress Party
2004	Subhash Pandharinath Thakre	Nationalist Congress Party

== Election results ==
=== Assembly Election 2004 ===
2004 Maharashtra Legislative Assembly election : Mangrulpir
Party	Candidate	Votes	%	±%
NCP	Subhash Pandharinath Thakre	45,175	31.25%	▼1.85
SS	Surve Bhimrao Namdeo	36,806	25.46%	▲0.87
Peoples Republican Party	Rathod Anil Gajadhar	20,120	13.92%	New
Independent	Thakare Hemendra Rajeshwar	11,810	8.17%	New
BBM	Dr. Rathod Subhash Pandurang	10,664	7.38%	▼22.28
BSP	Anantkumar Kisanrao Patil	10,246	7.09%	New
Independent	Suresh Ramji Jadhav	3,700	2.56%	New
Margin of victory		8,369	5.79%	▲2.35
Turnout		1,44,588	70.47%	▲6.16
Total valid votes		1,44,574		
Registered electors		2,05,179		▲16.59
NCP hold		Swing	▼1.85	

=== Assembly Election 1999 ===
1999 Maharashtra Legislative Assembly election : Mangrulpir
Party	Candidate	Votes	%	±%
NCP	Subhash Pandharinath Thakre	34,377	33.10%	New
BBM	Dr. Mahadev Parashram Rathod	30,800	29.65%	New
SS	Bhimrao Patil Surve	25,543	24.59%	▲15.22
Independent	Pawar Mukund Himmatrao	5,517	5.31%	New
Independent	Rathod Devisin Thanwara	2,989	2.88%	New
Independent	Durgadas Kisandas Rathod (Maharaj)	1,845	1.78%	New
Independent	Pawar Harischandra Gopising	1,416	1.36%	New
Margin of victory		3,577	3.44%	▼8.02
Turnout		1,13,165	64.31%	▼10.90
Total valid votes		1,03,871		
Registered electors		1,75,981		▲5.23
NCP gain from Independent		Swing	▼7.15	

=== Assembly Election 1995 ===
1995 Maharashtra Legislative Assembly election : Mangrulpir
Party	Candidate	Votes	%	±%
Independent	Rathod Gajadhar Ramsing	50,613	40.25%	New
INC	Thakare Subhash Pandharinath	36,202	28.79%	▲2.47
SS	Raut Shrikrishan Sakharam Alias Rajesh Patil	11,781	9.37%	▼1.00
Independent	Ingole Arvind Deoman	10,617	8.44%	New
Independent	Pande Pralhad Kanhuji	6,927	5.51%	New
Independent	Ramkul Gangaram Ananda	2,969	2.36%	New
Independent	Pande Ramesh Waman	973	0.77%	New
Margin of victory		14,411	11.46%	▲7.95
Turnout		1,28,236	76.68%	▲9.99
Total valid votes		1,25,756		
Registered electors		1,67,228		▲15.35
Independent hold		Swing	▲10.42	

=== Assembly Election 1990 ===
1990 Maharashtra Legislative Assembly election : Mangrulpir
Party	Candidate	Votes	%	±%
Independent	Thakare Subhashrao Pandhari	28,200	29.83%	New
INC	Rathod Gokuldas Devisingh	24,884	26.32%	▼14.45
BRP	Harishchandra Gopichandra Pawar	16,396	17.34%	New
SS	Lalitkumar Jagannath Patil	9,805	10.37%	New
JD	Vyawhare Publikrao Mnarotirao	9,504	10.05%	New
Independent	Ughale Ramkrushna Raibhan	3,353	3.55%	New
Margin of victory		3,316	3.51%	▼0.84
Turnout		95,863	66.13%	▲1.23
Total valid votes		94,539		
Registered electors		1,44,972		▲21.24
Independent gain from INC		Swing	▼10.94	

=== Assembly Election 1985 ===
1985 Maharashtra Legislative Assembly election : Mangrulpir
Party	Candidate	Votes	%	±%
INC	Rathod Devisin Thanwara	31,193	40.77%	New
Independent	Gadhawe Namdeorao Madhaorao	27,867	36.42%	New
Independent	Zanzad Kishor Ganpat	13,346	17.44%	New
IC(S)	Rathod Krishnarao Sitaram	1,859	2.43%	New
Independent	Shirsat Laxman Irbhanji	670	0.88%	New
Independent	Shringare Yuwraj Shankarrao	555	0.73%	New
Margin of victory		3,326	4.35%	▼22.35
Turnout		77,832	65.09%	▲6.71
Total valid votes		76,507		
Registered electors		1,19,571		▲10.89
INC gain from INC(U)		Swing	▼17.38	

=== Assembly Election 1980 ===
1980 Maharashtra Legislative Assembly election : Mangrulpir
Party	Candidate	Votes	%	±%
INC(U)	Rathod Gajadhar Ramsing	35,913	58.15%	New
INC(I)	Mohanawale Sherabhai Chhatubhai	19,423	31.45%	▲5.69
RPI	Madhukar Fakiraji Shrungare	4,761	7.71%	New
Independent	Rathod Krishnarao Sitaram	1,316	2.13%	New
Margin of victory		16,490	26.70%	▲20.51
Turnout		63,211	58.62%	▼18.60
Total valid votes		61,761		
Registered electors		1,07,825		▲6.45
INC(U) gain from PWPI		Swing	▲21.15	

=== Assembly Election 1978 ===
1978 Maharashtra Legislative Assembly election : Mangrulpir
Party	Candidate	Votes	%	±%
PWPI	Patil Anantkumar Kishanrao	28,438	37.00%	New
INC	Rathod Gajadhar Ramsing	23,680	30.81%	▼25.23
INC(I)	Mishra Shrinarayan Balaram	19,799	25.76%	New
RPI(K)	Khandare Kalawati Shankar	3,705	4.82%	New
Independent	Dawale Narayan Laxmanrao	935	1.22%	New
Margin of victory		4,758	6.19%	▼14.45
Turnout		79,114	78.10%	▲11.05
Total valid votes		76,863		
Registered electors		1,01,293		▼0.91
PWPI gain from INC		Swing	▼19.04	

=== Assembly Election 1972 ===
1972 Maharashtra Legislative Assembly election : Mangrulpir
Party	Candidate	Votes	%	±%
INC	Gajadhar Ramsing Rathod	37,135	56.03%	▲6.65
Independent	Bhimrao Laxmanrao Gadhave	23,453	35.39%	New
RPI	Sadashiv Kisan Bhagat	3,924	5.92%	▼44.70
Independent	Chendusing B. Chavan	1,264	1.91%	New
Margin of victory		13,682	20.65%	▲19.41
Turnout		75,079	73.45%	▼5.90
Total valid votes		66,272		
Registered electors		1,02,221		▲15.90
INC gain from RPI		Swing	▲5.42	

=== Assembly Election 1967 ===
1967 Maharashtra Legislative Assembly election : Mangrulpir
Party	Candidate	Votes	%	±%
RPI	C. U. Raghuwanshi	31,579	50.62%	New
INC	Gajadhar Ramsing Rathod	30,807	49.38%	▲0.82
Margin of victory		772	1.24%	▼13.56
Turnout		66,367	75.25%	▲15.12
Total valid votes		62,386		
Registered electors		88,199		▲31.94
RPI gain from INC		Swing	▲2.06	

=== Assembly Election 1962 ===
1962 Maharashtra Legislative Assembly election : Mangrulpir
Party	Candidate	Votes	%	±%
INC	Shanta Raghunath Page	18,055	48.56%	▼1.22
Independent	Tukaram Marotrao Nikam	12,552	33.76%	New
PWPI	Narayan Laxman Dawale	5,509	14.82%	▼10.99
Independent	Chendusing B. Chavan	1,063	2.86%	New
Margin of victory		5,503	14.80%	▼9.17
Turnout		40,638	60.79%	▼12.88
Total valid votes		37,179		
Registered electors		66,847		▲22.68
INC hold		Swing	▼1.22	

=== Assembly Election 1957 ===
1957 Bombay State Legislative Assembly election : Mangrulpir
Party	Candidate	Votes	%	±%
INC	Biyani Brijlal Nandlal	18,579	49.78%	▲5.87
PWPI	Gadhave Bhimrao Laxman	9,632	25.81%	New
PSP	Rathod Gajadhar Ramsing	7,599	20.36%	New
Independent	Ingole Tukaram Sonu	1,513	4.05%	New
Margin of victory		8,947	23.97%	▲11.65
Turnout		37,323	68.50%	▲5.08
Total valid votes		37,323		
Registered electors		54,488		▲2.75
INC hold		Swing	▲5.87	

=== Assembly Election 1952 ===
1952 Madhya Pradesh Legislative Assembly election : Mangrulpir
Party	Candidate	Votes	%	±%
INC	Babarao Anandrao Deshmukh	14,769	43.91%	New
Independent	Sakharam Ganaji Misal	10,626	31.59%	New
SKP	Narayan Laxman Dawale	5,458	16.23%	New
Independent	Sakharam Sitaram Bhagat	1,817	5.40%	New
Independent	Laxman Shivram Hambarde	962	2.86%	New
Margin of victory		4,143	12.32%	
Turnout		33,632	63.42%	
Total valid votes		33,632		
Registered electors		53,031		
INC win (new seat)				
