= Yelabara Assembly constituency =

Constituency of the Maharashtra legislative assembly in India

Yelabara
- Former constituency for the Maharashtra Legislative Assembly

Constituency details
- Country: India
- Region: Western India
- State: Maharashtra
- Established: 1961
- Abolished: 1964
- Total electors: 75,603
- Reservation: ST

Yelabara Assembly constituency was an assembly constituency in the India state of Maharashtra.

== Members of the Legislative Assembly ==
| Election | Member | Party |
|---|---|---|
| 1962 | Mahadeo Baliram Khandate | Indian National Congress |

== Election results ==
=== Assembly Election 1962 ===
1962 Maharashtra Legislative Assembly election : Yelabara
| Party | Candidate | Votes | % | ±% |
|---|---|---|---|---|
| INC | Mahadeo Baliram Khandate | 26,975 | 67.85% | New |
| Independent | Sukhdeo Pundlik Wooike | 10,272 | 25.84% | New |
| Independent | Anandrao Bhima Morey | 1,612 | 4.05% | New |
| ABJS | Jairampant Yeshwant Lulekar | 899 | 2.26% | New |
| Margin of victory | | 16,703 | 42.01% | |
| Turnout | | 43,291 | 57.26% | |
| Total valid votes | | 39,758 | | |
| Registered electors | | 75,603 | | |
| INC win (new seat) | | | | |
