= 1967 Maharashtra Legislative Assembly election =

State assembly election in India

Maharashtra State Assembly Elections, 1967
- 21 February 1967

All 270 assembly constituencies to Maharashtra Legislative Assembly 136 seats needed for a majority
- Turnout: 64.84% (▲4.48%)
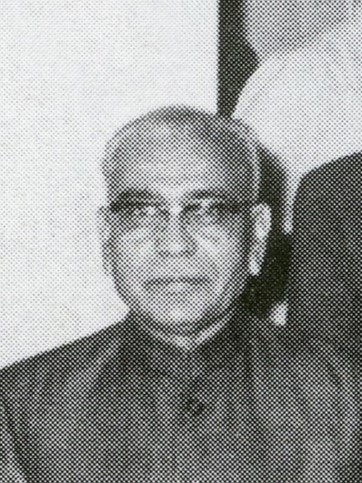
	Majority party	Minority party	Third party
		PWPI	CPI
Party	INC	PWPI	CPI
Last election	215 seats, 51.22%	15 seats, 7.47%	6 seats, 5.90%
Seats won	203	19	10
Seat change	▼12	▲4	▲4
Popular vote	6,288,564	1,043,239	651,077
Percentage	47.03%	7.80	4.87 %
Swing	▼4.19%	▲0.33%	▼1.03%
Chief Minister before election
Vasantrao Naik
INC
Elected Chief Minister
Vasantrao Naik
INC

The 1967 Maharashtra Legislative Assembly election was held for the third term of the Maharashtra Vidhan Sabha. A total of 274 seats were contested. The Indian National Congress won the largest number of seats. Incumbent Chief Minister Vasantrao Naik was reelected as Chief Minister.

== List of participating political parties ==
Party	Abbreviation
National Parties
Akhil Bharatiya Jana Sangh	BJS
Swatantra Party	SWA
Indian National Congress	INC
Samyukta Socialist Party	SSP
Praja Socialist Party	PSP
Communist Party of India (Marxist)	CPM/CPI(M)
Communist Party of India	CPI
Republican Party of India	RPI
State Parties
Peasants and Workers Party	PWP

== Results ==
=== Party results ===
Summary of results of the Maharashtra State Assembly election, 1967
Political Party	No. of candidates	No. of elected	Seat change	Number of Votes	% of Votes	Change in vote %
Indian National Congress 203 / 270 (75%)	270	203	▼12	6,288,564	47.03%	▼4.19%
Peasants and Workers Party of India 19 / 270 (7%)	58	19	▲4	1,043,239	7.80%	▲0.33%
Communist Party of India 10 / 270 (4%)	41	10	▲4	651,077	4.87%	▼1.03%
Praja Socialist Party 8 / 270 (3%)	66	8	▼1	545,935	4.08%	▼3.15%
Republican Party of India 5 / 270 (2%)	79	5	▲2	890,377	6.66%	▲1.28%
Bharatiya Jana Sangh 4 / 270 (1%)	166	4	▲4	1,092,670	8.17%	▲3.17%
Samyukta Socialist Party 4 / 270 (1%)	48	4	▲3	616,466	4.61%	▲4.11%
Communist Party of India (Marxist) 1 / 270 (0.4%)	11	1	▲1	145,083	1.08%	▲1.08% (New Party)
Swatantra Party	40	0	Steady	150,101	1.12%	▲0.68%
Independents 16 / 270 (6%)	463	16	▲1	1,948,223	14.57%	▼2.17%
Total	1242	270	▲6	13,371,735	64.84%	▲4.48%

=== Results by constituency ===
Winner, runner-up, voter turnout, and victory margin in every constituency
Assembly Constituency		Turnout	Winner				Runner Up				Margin
#k	Names	%	Candidate	Party	Votes	%	Candidate	Party	Votes	%	Margin
1	Sawantwadi	62.41%	Shivram Sawant Khem Sawant Bhonsale	INC	27,452	66.29%	Jaya Nand Shiv Ram Mathkar	PSP	9,686	23.39%	17,766
2	Vengurla	61.88%	Pundalik A. Kinalekar	PSP	16,594	41.15%	S. B. Naik	SSP	11,974	29.69%	4,620
3	Kankavli	53.24%	S. S. Sawant	PWPI	12,826	38.95%	Bhaskar Balkrishna Sawant	INC	11,438	34.73%	1,388
4	Malvan	58.74%	V. G. Prabhugaonkar	INC	16,966	50.41%	Shyam Gangaram Kocharekar	PSP	14,868	44.18%	2,098
5	Deogad	55.95%	R. B. Munj	PSP	14,561	37.82%	R. G. Mirashi	INC	9,398	24.41%	5,163
6	Rajapur	62.67%	Laxman Rangnath Hatankar	PSP	23,156	58.59%	Sahadev Mukund Thakre	INC	11,443	28.95%	11,713
7	Lanja	59.05%	Shashishenkar Kashinath Athalye	PSP	16,620	47.88%	Shiwajirao Sawant	INC	12,556	36.17%	4,064
8	Ratnagiri	60.22%	Shantaram Laxman Peje	INC	22,108	55.15%	V. K. Nivendkar	ABJS	13,646	34.04%	8,462
9	Sangameshwar	55.17%	Bhuwad Laxmibai Babaji	INC	15,231	38.50%	S. D. Bhide	ABJS	8,859	22.39%	6,372
10	Chiplun	63.56%	P. K. Sawant	INC	22,528	53.11%	R. G. Ghag	ABJS	10,459	24.66%	12,069
11	Guhagar	63.16%	M. S. Kesarkar	INC	18,484	42.46%	P. R. Asar	ABJS	15,614	35.86%	2,870
12	Khed	58.75%	Husen Dalwai	INC	20,203	49.66%	T. B. More	Independent	11,199	27.53%	9,004
13	Dapoli	66.43%	Ramchandra Vithal Bhelose	INC	21,423	47.63%	G. D. Sakpal	Independent	12,416	27.61%	9,007
14	Mahad	68.98%	Shankar Babaji Sawant	INC	23,221	46.38%	K. R. Pawar	PSP	21,672	43.28%	1,549
15	Shrivardhan	70.76%	A. R. Antulay	INC	25,450	46.10%	M. L. Dandekar	PWPI	23,056	41.76%	2,394
16	Mangaon	63.28%	P. R. Sanap	PWPI	28,909	57.79%	B. S. Sule	INC	16,715	33.41%	12,194
17	Pen	68.96%	A. P. Shetye	PWPI	23,794	47.91%	Ambaji Tukaram Patil	INC	23,021	46.35%	773
18	Alibag	73.66%	Datta Narayan Patil	PWPI	27,011	50.65%	Khanvilkar Datajirao Krishnanarao	INC	24,124	45.23%	2,887
19	Panvel	66.12%	Dinkar Patil	PWPI	29,546	60.19%	Gajanan Narayan Patil	INC	17,375	35.39%	12,171
20	Khalapur	58.41%	S. R. Raut	PWPI	21,161	50.57%	Balkrishna Limbaji Patil	INC	14,689	35.10%	6,472
21	Colaba	66.08%	B. B. K. Bawan	Independent	23,536	51.59%	K. S. Dhabia	INC	13,627	29.87%	9,909
22	Dhobitalao	64.32%	Popat Mohanlal Bhavanbhai	INC	22,298	45.04%	A. J. Shela	SSP	14,426	29.14%	7,872
23	Girgaon	73.29%	Anant Namjoshi	INC	23,572	43.13%	A. Pendse	PWPI	20,198	36.95%	3,374
24	Kinwat	69.03%	Uttamrao Baliram Rathod	INC	27,788	49.31%	V. R. Shinde	PWPI	20,618	36.59%	7,170
25	Umarkhadi	64.60%	G. M. Banatwala	Independent	23,253	46.74%	I. K. Husain	INC	17,169	34.51%	6,084
26	Mazgaon	66.27%	Vithal Krishnaji Torasakar	INC	20,903	44.85%	R. G. Kharat	RPI	10,734	23.03%	10,169
27	Nagpada	63.74%	S. A. Usman	INC	18,292	35.84%	F. M. Hanif Hanif	Independent	13,240	25.94%	5,052
28	Khetwadi	68.36%	M. N. Gogate	INC	18,538	35.31%	G. L. Reddy	CPI	13,175	25.10%	5,363
29	Walkeshwar	65.67%	H. J. Taleyarkhan	INC	25,491	46.20%	N. M. Chudasama	SWA	16,833	30.51%	8,658
30	Byculla	65.04%	G. B. Ganacharaya	CPI	23,168	44.18%	M. G. Faki	INC	20,844	39.75%	2,324
31	Love Grove	62.24%	Puna Tabha Patel	INC	24,532	38.89%	Arjun Ramchandra Alekar	RPI	24,324	38.56%	208
32	Worli	66.78%	Madhav Narayan Birje	INC	22,743	38.32%	P. K. Kurane	CPI(M)	18,748	31.59%	3,995
33	Parbhani	53.63%	A. R. Gavane	PWPI	17,873	42.87%	M. S. Rao	INC	16,568	39.74%	1,305
34	Sewree	69.83%	Sawalram Gopal Patkar	CPI	30,163	47.84%	V. B. Arolkar	INC	21,266	33.73%	8,897
35	Naigaon	67.03%	Ram Arjun Mahadik	PSP	15,145	28.87%	Y. B. Ambedkar	RPI	13,547	25.82%	1,598
36	Dadar	72.47%	Waman Shankar Matkar	INC	25,527	39.45%	Jayawant Moreshwar Patil	CPI	20,042	30.97%	5,485
37	Mahim	71.72%	Frederick Michael Pinto	INC	28,152	50.01%	D. S. Pradhan	ABJS	14,474	25.71%	13,678
38	Matunga	69.55%	Liladhar Passu Shah	INC	17,213	36.47%	V. R. Murthy	SWA	15,885	33.66%	1,328
39	Kurla	65.98%	T. R. Naravane	INC	18,301	30.29%	K. R. Gangurde	RPI	12,184	20.17%	6,117
40	Bandra	67.58%	Purushottam Ganesh Kher	INC	27,817	40.00%	Sadanand Shankar Varde	PSP	19,454	27.98%	8,363
41	Santacruz	64.51%	S. R. Patkar	INC	23,665	40.56%	S. R. Jagtap	CPI	16,587	28.43%	7,078
42	Andheri	62.81%	V. G. Rawal	INC	24,666	37.35%	B. S. Bhume	Independent	23,565	35.68%	1,101
43	Vile Parle	66.18%	Pranlal Vora	INC	24,298	40.81%	K. H. Deodhar	Independent	9,690	16.28%	14,608
44	Malad	65.13%	D. S. Patel	INC	30,228	38.11%	P. B. Samant	SSP	22,802	28.75%	7,426
45	Borivali	64.28%	J. G. Dattani	INC	24,148	41.10%	D. G. Palkar	SSP	10,254	17.45%	13,894
46	Chembur	71.55%	Hashu Advani	ABJS	21,841	28.43%	N. G. Acharya	INC	19,561	25.47%	2,280
47	Ghatkopar	64.93%	D. Samant	RPI	34,631	40.89%	A. N. Magar	INC	24,366	28.77%	10,265
48	Mulund	68.27%	P. V. Upadhyay	INC	32,427	39.32%	P. P. Sanzgiri	CPI(M)	20,816	25.24%	11,611
49	Thane	67.39%	D. K. Rajarshi	INC	21,093	37.19%	D. B. Tamhane	PSP	14,317	25.24%	6,776
50	Kalyan	69.24%	Krishnarao Dhulap	PWPI	23,438	38.06%	R. G. Kapse	ABJS	18,553	30.12%	4,885
51	Ulhasnagar	60.69%	Sanmukh Chuharmal Israni	INC	24,713	48.49%	P. K. Ailani	Independent	11,281	22.14%	13,432
52	Murbad	58.67%	Shantaram Gopal Gholap	INC	21,001	47.06%	S. B. Yadao	RPI	14,972	33.55%	6,029
53	Bhiwandi	61.48%	Bhai Patil	PWPI	28,735	46.96%	N. B. Patil	INC	19,698	32.19%	9,037
54	Bassein	78.18%	Hari Govindrao Vartak	INC	34,494	50.12%	Sadanand G. Warty	PSP	25,252	36.69%	9,242
55	Palghar	73.07%	N. B. Shaha	PSP	25,417	54.35%	C. B. Vartak	INC	19,052	40.74%	6,365
56	Dahanu	61.15%	Mahadeo Gopal Kadu	INC	20,627	52.22%	N. R. Ozarya	CPI(M)	14,469	36.63%	6,158
57	Kasa	49.45%	R. V. Sumada	INC	12,134	31.01%	K. K. Dhodade	PSP	9,605	24.55%	2,529
58	Jawhar	44.23%	K. S. Karavande	INC	9,874	34.66%	Ramchandra Gopal Bhoye	SSP	9,367	32.88%	507
59	Shahapur	54.77%	P. R. Patil	Independent	16,101	42.53%	D. J. Songal	INC	15,259	40.30%	842
60	Igatpuri	51.16%	S. G. Chavare	INC	25,788	65.36%	L. K. Bombale	CPI	13,665	34.64%	12,123
61	Deolali	69.44%	S. N. Deshmukh	INC	17,394	43.58%	V. T. Aringale	Independent	11,066	27.72%	6,328
62	Nashik	62.56%	Vasant Narayan Naik	INC	22,521	47.73%	Bhilkchand Vedushet Vadnagare	ABJS	18,550	39.31%	3,971
63	Sinnar	62.13%	Ramkrishna Narayan Naik	INC	12,901	30.96%	A. G. Durve	Independent	12,750	30.60%	151
64	Niphad	69.41%	Dulaji Sitaram Patil	INC	16,481	38.06%	P. N. Karad	SSP	13,282	30.67%	3,199
65	Yevla	65.46%	Madhavrao T. Patil	INC	21,224	49.75%	K. S. Patel	ABJS	12,811	30.03%	8,413
66	Nandgaon	66.90%	Shivram Dadaji Hire	SSP	23,550	47.51%	H. M. Gavali	INC	23,013	46.42%	537
67	Malegaon	65.35%	Nihal Ahmed Maulavi Mohammed Usman	PSP	21,565	38.15%	H. A. Ansari	INC	13,924	24.63%	7,641
68	Dabhadi	63.26%	Hiray Baliram Waman	INC	31,382	61.96%	Shivaji Namdeo Patil	SSP	11,904	23.50%	19,478
69	Chandor	64.05%	R. G. Gunjal	INC	17,769	39.69%	S. B. Nikam	Independent	14,259	31.85%	3,510
70	Dindori	51.92%	S. B. Ptinde	PWPI	20,861	54.72%	Kacharu Bhau Raut	INC	17,262	45.28%	3,599
71	Solapur South	52.75%	Virupakshappa Guruppa Shivdare	INC	27,507	77.60%	M. B. Dheke	SWA	4,259	12.02%	23,248
72	Baglan	76.26%	P. D. Patil	INC	36,138	64.46%	Udaram Tulshiram Deore	RPI	19,925	35.54%	16,213
73	Sakri	66.09%	U. R. Nandre	CPI	27,742	51.58%	K. S. Devre	INC	22,282	41.43%	5,460
74	Navapur	45.02%	Dharma Jayaram Kokani	INC	13,383	42.18%	F. R. Valvi	ABJS	6,169	19.44%	7,214
75	Nandurbar	57.71%	Ramesh Panya Valvi	INC	26,321	56.57%	Z. N. Valvi	ABJS	20,211	43.43%	6,110
76	Surgana	37.66%	Sitaram Savaji Bhoye	RPI	18,076	67.88%	A. R. Jadhav	INC	6,496	24.39%	11,580
77	Shahada	55.57%	S. B. Pawar	INC	19,533	52.94%	J. P. Pawara	ABJS	16,343	44.29%	3,190
78	Shirpur	68.44%	Shivajirao Girdhar Patil	INC	27,118	53.85%	P. M. Patil	ABJS	21,177	42.05%	5,941
79	Sindkheda	58.77%	Narayanrao Sahadeorao Patil	INC	29,407	65.53%	R. C. Patil	PSP	13,246	29.52%	16,161
80	Dhulia North	53.73%	Chandrakant Nandeo Patil	INC	25,993	61.17%	D. P. Patil	SSP	14,342	33.75%	11,651
81	Dhulia South	65.57%	Dr. Chaudhari	CPI	21,997	46.44%	J. D. Raul	INC	19,612	41.40%	2,385
82	Chalisgaon	51.67%	Dinakar Diwan Chavan	INC	22,656	56.20%	M. D. More	PSP	5,770	14.31%	16,886
83	Parola	54.88%	Gulabrao Narayanrao Pawar	INC	20,569	46.82%	Shrinivas Chunilal Agarwal	ABJS	12,889	29.34%	7,680
84	Amalner	61.56%	Krushibhushan Sahebrao Patil	INC	25,087	57.37%	Gulabrao Wamanrao Patil	PSP	8,452	19.33%	16,635
85	Chopda	72.43%	M. N. Gujrathi	Independent	24,477	43.42%	S. S. Patil	INC	24,011	42.59%	466
86	Erandol	65.36%	Digambar Shankar Patil	INC	24,312	49.97%	Y. S. Parihar	Independent	14,316	29.43%	9,996
87	Jalgaon	64.64%	T. T. Salunkhe	INC	18,543	38.80%	Bhalerao Sadashiv Narayan	CPI	16,506	34.53%	2,037
88	Pachora	63.54%	Supadu Bhadu Patil	INC	23,668	47.95%	Onkar Narayan Wagh	SSP	21,097	42.74%	2,571
89	Jamner	63.56%	Abaji Nana Patil	INC	20,302	42.54%	G. R. Garud	PSP	15,184	31.82%	5,118
90	Bhusawal	60.86%	P. S. Phalak	INC	28,305	57.21%	Kanji Premji Joshi	ABJS	11,723	23.69%	16,582
91	Yawal	71.98%	Jivaram Tukaram Mahajan	INC	26,474	52.94%	Ganpat Bhavadu Mahajan	PSP	11,842	23.68%	14,632
92	Raver	74.88%	Mahukar Dhanaji Chaudhari	INC	39,335	73.29%	K. G. Patil	ABJS	7,325	13.65%	32,010
93	Edlabad	62.65%	Pratibha Patil	INC	21,559	51.16%	R. S. Pawar	ABJS	6,927	16.44%	14,632
94	Malkapur	73.01%	Abarao S. Deshmukh	INC	26,733	45.16%	Arjun Awadhut Wankhade	ABJS	22,402	37.85%	4,331
95	Buldhana	75.52%	S. S. Patil	INC	27,016	44.88%	A. V. L. Seth	RPI	18,849	31.31%	8,167
96	Chikhali	75.90%	T. B. Khedekar	INC	23,783	39.62%	Keshaorao Jaiwantrao Bahekar	ABJS	20,545	34.22%	3,238
97	Lonar	66.63%	K. T. Sangle	INC	30,874	50.06%	Sahebrao Bhaurao Mapari	RPI	15,089	24.47%	15,785
98	Mehkar	80.23%	Sitaram Chinkaji Lodhe	INC	25,232	41.77%	G. V. Tale	RPI	19,895	32.93%	5,337
99	Khamgaon	70.47%	G. R. Bhatiya	INC	36,885	62.98%	Tukaram Ganpat Khumkar	RPI	15,486	26.44%	21,399
100	Shegaon	75.35%	T. P. Dhokne	INC	28,859	48.23%	Kashiram Raybhan Patil	PWPI	23,409	39.12%	5,450
101	Akot	75.06%	Gopalrao Bajirao Khedkar	INC	33,827	57.99%	B. B. Wankhade	ABJS	21,605	37.03%	12,222
102	Borgaon Manju	71.04%	Nilkanth Shridhar Sapkal	INC	36,885	63.77%	T. P. Patil	PWPI	16,129	27.89%	20,756
103	Akole	64.88%	Jamanlal Shriramji Geonka	INC	24,113	47.86%	M. U. Lahane	ABJS	16,466	32.68%	7,647
104	Balapur	69.41%	Madhusudan Vairale	INC	28,690	53.65%	S. H. Mankar	RPI	14,888	27.84%	13,802
105	Medshi	69.45%	Ramrao Gopalrao Zanak	INC	33,149	59.74%	J. D. Rajurkar	RPI	18,291	32.96%	14,858
106	Washim	69.62%	M. M. Khirade	INC	21,671	58.19%	V. K. Gaikwad	RPI	8,758	23.52%	12,913
107	Mangrulpir	75.25%	C. U. Raghuwanshi	RPI	31,579	50.62%	Gajadhar Ramsing Rathod	INC	30,807	49.38%	772
108	Murtizapur	68.51%	Pratibhadevi Tidke	INC	27,593	52.44%	S. P. Pachade	Independent	13,774	26.18%	13,819
109	Daryapur	81.10%	Narayanrao Uttamrao Deshmukh	INC	34,467	50.80%	Jagannath Deorao Patil	RPI	33,002	48.64%	1,465
110	Melghat	53.20%	D. N. Patel	INC	21,004	55.06%	S. Chinu	RPI	14,602	38.28%	6,402
111	Achalpur	73.91%	Narsingrao Sheshrao Deshmukh	INC	31,002	48.77%	W. D. Deshmukh	CPI	20,135	31.67%	10,867
112	Morshi	69.72%	K. W. Waman	INC	28,209	49.17%	N. D. Nangle	CPI	10,137	17.67%	18,072
113	Walgaon	72.73%	U. Rao B. Rao Mahalle	INC	26,761	48.16%	B. V. Bonde	PWPI	25,185	45.32%	1,576
114	Amravati	59.64%	K. N. Nawathe	INC	21,634	43.87%	B. D. Karanjikar	SSP	20,663	41.90%	971
115	Badnera	71.83%	Krishn Rao B. Shrunngare	RPI	31,744	52.85%	Purushottam K. Deshmukh	INC	23,091	38.44%	8,653
116	Chandur	74.33%	Bhaurao Gulabrao Jadhao	INC	28,427	43.54%	F. B. More	RPI	17,993	27.56%	10,434
117	Arvi	75.22%	J. G. Kadam	INC	29,537	43.22%	Z. Z. Dahake	Independent	18,562	27.16%	10,975
118	Pulgaon	71.15%	N. R. Kale	Independent	23,267	38.59%	S. V. Sonawane	INC	18,146	30.10%	5,121
119	Wardha	71.91%	Ramchandra Ghangare Marot	CPI(M)	22,307	39.93%	Bapuraoji Marotrao Deshmukh	INC	19,853	35.54%	2,454
120	Hinganghat	75.57%	Keshaorao Motiram Zade	INC	30,092	43.94%	V. M. Chaudhari	Independent	24,375	35.59%	5,717
121	Umrer	60.18%	S. B. Deotale	INC	19,732	40.92%	K. S. Meskar	Independent	11,673	24.21%	8,059
122	Kamthi	63.14%	S. Khan A. Kgan Pathan	INC	22,154	41.50%	N. H. Kumbhare	RPI	14,972	28.05%	7,182
123	Nagpur North	66.59%	P. R. Wasnik	INC	29,404	44.87%	D. G. Songare	RPI	25,754	39.30%	3,650
124	Nagpur East	67.52%	Y. R. Deogade	INC	30,108	47.46%	Ramjiwan F. Chaudhary	ABJS	14,463	22.80%	15,645
125	Nagpur Central	69.58%	M. J. Agrawal	INC	24,722	39.59%	Dr. D. P. Meshram	RPI	15,155	24.27%	9,567
126	Nagpur West	65.74%	Sushila Balraj	INC	25,694	45.69%	Sumati B. Suklikar	ABJS	16,793	29.86%	8,901
127	Kalmeshwar	71.04%	Wankhede Sheshrao Krishnarao	INC	29,603	53.30%	B. A. Yaolkar	Independent	22,474	40.46%	7,129
128	Katol	83.52%	J. S. Chandak	Independent	33,661	53.32%	S. D. Gedam	INC	27,284	43.22%	6,377
129	Savner	67.01%	Narendra Mahipati Tidke	INC	29,859	58.11%	S. Z. Deshbhratar	RPI	9,086	17.68%	20,773
130	Ramtek	51.72%	Gunderao Fakiraji Mahajan	INC	16,905	44.70%	M. M. Borkar	RPI	7,068	18.69%	9,837
131	Tumsar	71.67%	Keshaorao Pardhi	INC	29,171	47.69%	D. P. Rewatkar	RPI	14,561	23.80%	14,610
132	Bhandara	76.61%	Dada Da Jibaji Dhote	Independent	27,915	46.44%	N. K. Tirapude	INC	21,608	35.95%	6,307
133	Tirora	74.28%	B. L. Patel	INC	26,121	43.81%	G. J. Gaharwar	SSP	16,754	28.10%	9,367
134	Gondiya	66.37%	Gopalnarayan Shivavinayak Bajpayee	INC	27,057	46.81%	H. G. Maheshwari	ABJS	15,053	26.04%	12,004
135	Goregaon	69.70%	Puranlal Dharmabhan Rahangdale	INC	22,524	40.05%	S. B. Doye	Independent	21,233	37.76%	1,291
136	Amgaon	54.83%	Laxmanrao Mankar	ABJS	13,844	33.65%	N. M. Bahekar	SSP	13,218	32.13%	626
137	Sakoli	71.87%	S. P. Kapgate	ABJS	20,904	38.49%	A. G. Samrti	INC	16,980	31.26%	3,924
138	Arjuni-Morgaon	66.40%	Paulzagade Adku Sonu	INC	19,840	37.44%	Namdeo Harbaji Diwathe	ABJS	15,353	28.98%	4,487
139	Adyar	72.54%	M. N. Waldewar	RPI	14,247	26.31%	R. Zibalaji Katekhaye	Independent	14,098	26.03%	149
140	Armoor	50.53%	D. V. Narnavare	INC	15,707	39.81%	N. S. Uikey	SSP	13,601	34.47%	2,106
141	Gadchiroli	55.45%	Raje Vishveshvar Rao	Independent	23,524	69.39%	Maroti Rughoba Naroti	INC	8,338	24.59%	15,186
142	Sironcha	53.48%	J. Y. Sakhare	Independent	15,920	41.16%	M. V. Alone	INC	14,275	36.90%	1,645
143	Rajura	61.14%	S. B. Jiwtode Guruji	Independent	21,435	48.62%	Vithalrao Laxmanrao Dhote	INC	17,521	39.74%	3,914
144	Chanda	56.46%	E. P. Salve	INC	23,782	46.22%	S. S. Potdukhe	Independent	12,007	23.34%	11,775
145	Saoli	70.64%	W. V. Goddamvar	INC	30,485	54.92%	T. B. Deskar	ABJS	16,160	29.11%	14,325
146	Bramhapuri	71.32%	Gurpude Baliram Marotrao	INC	23,125	38.41%	S. Jani	Independent	13,743	22.83%	9,382
147	Chimur	64.19%	Marotirao D. Tumpalliwar	INC	18,256	40.58%	G. K. Korekar	SSP	9,545	21.22%	8,711
148	Bhadrawati	65.85%	Ramchandra Janardhan Deotale	INC	25,232	44.46%	Vithal Rao Laxman Rao Deotale	SSP	23,570	41.53%	1,662
149	Wani	70.64%	Vithalrao Yeshwantrao Gohokar	INC	19,639	39.33%	Guruji D.M. Thawari	Independent	18,182	36.41%	1,457
150	Ralegaon	65.78%	M. N. Bhalavi	Independent	29,036	58.68%	M. B. Khandate	INC	15,502	31.33%	13,534
151	Kelapur	78.92%	A. D. Parvekar	INC	31,113	52.91%	B. G. Kongarekar	Independent	21,534	36.62%	9,579
152	Yavatmal	75.13%	Jambuwantrao Dhote	Independent	35,374	59.03%	A. Mamdani	INC	19,051	31.79%	16,323
153	Darwha	77.40%	V. B. Ghuikhedkar	Independent	29,163	51.48%	R. R. Mahure	INC	18,320	32.34%	10,843
154	Digras	75.24%	K. D. Mahindre	INC	26,164	42.29%	H. K. Jamankar	PWPI	21,425	34.63%	4,739
155	Pusad	81.80%	Vasantrao Naik	INC	42,089	69.81%	R. Monagthane	Independent	15,335	25.44%	26,754
156	Umarkhed	71.71%	Shankarrao Mane Ajaji	INC	28,402	60.26%	K. A. Deosarkar	Independent	8,840	18.76%	19,562
157	Kolhapur	70.05%	Karkhanis T. Rao Sitaram	PWPI	31,743	67.50%	D. R. Bagade	INC	10,479	22.28%	21,264
158	Hadgaon	59.57%	Bhimrao Keshavrao Deshmukh	INC	29,308	57.54%	V. G. Shinde	CPI	15,865	31.15%	13,443
159	Nanded	51.77%	Farook Pasha Makhdum Pasha	INC	24,063	52.36%	Vithalrao Devidasrao Deshpande	CPI	16,426	35.74%	7,637
160	Bhokar	61.37%	Shankarrao Chavan	INC	32,910	68.35%	N. S. Vibhute	RPI	15,241	31.65%	17,669
161	Biloli	43.09%	J. G. Ambekar	INC	21,322	48.01%	V. M. Patne	SSP	15,411	34.70%	5,911
162	Deglur	33.01%	M. R. Ghate	INC	15,142	54.38%	K. Dhondiba	RPI	10,693	38.40%	4,449
163	Kandhar	44.87%	Keshavrao Shankarrao Dhondge	PWPI	23,871	49.03%	S. S. Deshmukh	INC	13,944	28.64%	9,927
164	Gangakhed	24.29%	Nameorao Marotrao	INC	14,806	65.90%	D. L. More	RPI	6,511	28.98%	8,295
165	Paranda	59.86%	K. H. Patil	INC	23,396	46.45%	B. N. Deshmukh	PWPI	21,303	42.30%	2,093
166	Basmath	40.33%	W. R. Nayak	INC	15,541	46.62%	V. M. Katneshwar	Independent	7,542	22.62%	7,999
167	Kalamnuri	61.78%	V. N. Chinchordikar	CPI	25,882	52.50%	K. H. Sawant	INC	19,324	39.20%	6,558
168	Hingoli	55.48%	Chandrakant Ramkrishna Patil	SSP	22,520	49.57%	N. Lokavarkhe	INC	17,295	38.07%	5,225
169	Jintur	56.65%	S. W. Kalamkar	INC	22,334	50.72%	S. A. Deshmukh	PWPI	19,026	43.21%	3,308
170	Pathri	52.71%	Sakhram Gopalrao Nakhate	INC	26,669	60.56%	Babarao Sopan Naik	PWPI	13,116	29.79%	13,553
171	Partur	49.34%	R. N. Yadav	INC	19,958	55.16%	G. G. Lipane	PWPI	10,720	29.63%	9,238
172	Ambad	43.01%	A. Ambadas	INC	21,126	54.52%	B. Sakharam	SSP	8,517	21.98%	12,609
173	Jalna South	41.74%	R. B. Lala	SSP	12,716	34.26%	B. Narayan	INC	11,525	31.05%	1,191
174	Jalna North	40.02%	Gambhirrao Gadhe	INC	16,425	47.97%	G. D. Chitnis	CPI	8,871	25.91%	7,554
175	Bhokardan	51.77%	B. J. Kale	INC	22,566	51.39%	P. H. Danve	ABJS	12,063	27.47%	10,503
176	Sillod	51.00%	Shivram Gangaram Mankar	INC	21,101	55.65%	S. R. Patil	SWA	11,818	31.17%	9,283
177	Kannad	44.22%	Narayan Girmaji Patil	INC	22,731	66.26%	K. Gurudayal	Independent	8,245	24.03%	14,486
178	Vaijapur	64.05%	V. P. Patil	INC	25,024	54.32%	K. Gangadhar	Independent	15,317	33.25%	9,707
179	Gangapur	56.83%	Balasaheb Ramrao Pawar	INC	27,829	64.99%	C. Digamberdas	CPI	14,019	32.74%	13,810
180	Aurangabad West	61.29%	Zakaria Rafiq Balimy	INC	27,282	59.64%	R. D. Aurangabadkar	RPI	9,713	21.23%	17,569
181	Aurangabad East	100.00%	V. Suryabhan	INC	18,725	54.42%	R. Eknath	ABJS	11,622	33.78%	7,103
182	Paithan	54.49%	Kalyanrao Pandhorinath	INC	25,123	65.52%	K. Marutirao	Independent	10,080	26.29%	15,043
183	Georai	55.59%	S. T. Pawar	CPI	23,376	56.47%	S. T. Pandit	INC	16,960	40.97%	6,416
184	Manjlegaon	42.49%	Sankeran Nathu Tribhuwan	INC	15,426	47.29%	R. L. Ghadale	ABJS	8,080	24.77%	7,346
185	Bhir	47.05%	S. B. Chavre	INC	11,648	24.28%	K. T. Hadhav	CPI	10,841	22.60%	807
186	Ashti	59.03%	N. V. Ugale	CPI	31,158	59.51%	B. K. Ajbe	INC	21,201	40.49%	9,957
187	Chausala	49.06%	V. A. Darade	CPI	29,175	55.42%	S. L. Kadam	INC	17,424	33.10%	11,751
188	Kaij	54.95%	Sundarrao Solanke	INC	19,521	48.77%	G. M. Burrande	CPI(M)	16,703	41.73%	2,818
189	Renapur	52.54%	Anna Ganpathi Gite	INC	20,051	50.71%	A. N. Chavan	PWPI	12,911	32.65%	7,140
190	Ahmedpur	54.31%	Mahalingappa Alias Appasaheb Baslingappa	INC	19,605	44.06%	K. N. Deshmukh	PWPI	19,073	42.86%	532
191	Udgir	40.08%	P. S. Sarwade	INC	15,419	46.11%	V. B. Khadiwale	Independent	9,920	29.67%	5,499
192	Latur	72.10%	V. R. Kaldate	SSP	28,948	53.31%	Keshavrao Sonawane	INC	24,470	45.07%	4,478
193	Kallam	58.65%	D. T. Mohite	INC	23,974	46.17%	N. K. Jadhav Patil	PWPI	21,628	41.65%	2,346
194	Parel	73.56%	Krishna Desai	CPI	28,847	47.38%	Madhavrao Ganpatrao Mani	INC	18,231	29.94%	10,616
195	Osmanabad	69.25%	Udhavrao Patil	PWPI	24,877	48.01%	K. D. Samudra	INC	23,330	45.03%	1,547
196	Ausa	66.52%	V. S. Musande	INC	27,882	53.21%	M. G. Maharaj	PWPI	21,994	41.97%	5,888
197	Nilanga	73.39%	Shivajirao Patil Nilangekar	INC	32,744	55.34%	Shripatrao Gyanurao Solunke	PWPI	22,394	37.85%	10,350
198	Omerga	69.15%	Bhaskarrao Chalukya	INC	27,581	53.48%	H. Y. Belurkar	CPI	21,423	41.54%	6,158
199	Tuljapur	63.41%	Shivajirao Patil	INC	20,001	39.75%	P. S. Shinde	Independent	17,870	35.51%	2,131
200	Akkalkot	67.54%	Nirmalaraje Vijayasinh Bhosale	INC	29,868	56.87%	R. K. Magonda	Independent	18,158	34.58%	11,710
71	Solapur South	52.75%	Virupakshappa Guruppa Shivdare	INC	27,507	77.60%	M. B. Dheke	SWA	4,259	12.02%	23,248
202	Solapur City South	65.26%	V. R. Patil	Independent	15,105	37.31%	V. S. Nanshetti	INC	14,373	35.51%	732
203	Solapur City North	71.89%	Ramkrishna Pant Bet	INC	18,722	40.49%	V. R. Madur	CPI	15,809	34.19%	2,913
204	North Sholapur	65.76%	B. K. Mane	Independent	19,772	45.58%	R. S. Shah	INC	18,796	43.33%	976
205	Mangalwedha	65.70%	K. R. Marda	INC	26,208	51.09%	R. S. Shah	Independent	22,921	44.68%	3,287
206	Mohol	68.07%	G. B. Buragute	INC	19,523	38.42%	D. M. Kade	Independent	16,593	32.66%	2,930
207	Barshi	72.36%	Prabhatai Shankarrao Zadbuke	INC	27,161	53.67%	P. P. Surana	SSP	21,369	42.23%	5,792
208	Madha	69.98%	Sampatrao Maruti Patil	PWPI	28,948	52.98%	K. K. Parabat	INC	22,634	41.42%	6,314
209	Pandharpur	63.83%	Audumber Kondiba Patil	INC	26,336	52.40%	J. G. More	Independent	14,591	29.03%	11,745
210	Sangola	68.07%	Ganpatrao Deshmukh	PWPI	26,843	50.63%	B. B. Salunkhe	INC	26,175	49.37%	668
211	Malshiras	72.83%	Shankarrao Mohite-Patil	INC	34,145	60.99%	J. N. Jadhav	PWPI	21,019	37.54%	13,126
212	Karmala	55.98%	K. G. Kamble	INC	20,542	58.04%	R. S. Ranshrungare	RPI	13,259	37.46%	7,283
213	Karjat	61.71%	E. B. Nimbalkar	INC	27,142	62.48%	R. M. Zarkar	ABJS	8,519	19.61%	18,623
214	Shrigonda	43.80%	Baburao Mahadeo Bharaskar	INC	14,263	51.59%	A. G. Shinde	RPI	7,139	25.82%	7,124
215	Ahmednagar South	67.11%	S. V. Nisal	INC	16,485	37.24%	P. K. Bhapkar	Independent	14,677	33.16%	1,808
216	Ahmednagar North	63.14%	Mhaske Kisanrao Balaji	INC	22,421	46.27%	Balasaheb Nabaji Nagwade	CPI	15,866	32.74%	6,555
217	Pathardi	63.30%	T. S. Bharade	INC	28,316	50.57%	J. K. Kakade	CPI	26,520	47.36%	1,796
218	Shevgaon	69.21%	Marutrao Shankarao Ghule	INC	26,610	51.60%	V. B. Langhe	CPI	21,223	41.15%	5,387
219	Shrirampur	64.04%	J. W. Bankar	INC	23,066	56.27%	G. J. Ogale	PSP	13,120	32.01%	9,946
220	Shirdi	74.27%	Mohanrao Abasaheb Gade	Independent	31,482	54.81%	S. D. Kale	INC	22,581	39.31%	8,901
221	Rahuri	65.07%	Baburao Bapuji Tanapure	INC	26,320	53.63%	B. G. Thorat	CPI	18,525	37.75%	7,795
222	Parner	52.67%	N. T. Gunjal	INC	18,814	48.89%	S. T. Auty	CPI	16,451	42.75%	2,363
223	Sangamner	70.69%	B. J. Khatal-Patil	INC	28,919	48.76%	B. G. Durve	SSP	27,521	46.41%	1,398
224	Nagar–Akola	65.56%	B. K. Deshmukh	CPI	30,055	57.59%	Y. S. Bhangare	INC	20,073	38.46%	9,982
225	Junnar	55.21%	D. R. Kakade	INC	18,486	48.06%	J. S. Phule	SSP	17,083	44.42%	1,403
226	Ambegaon	60.36%	D. G. Walase	INC	25,553	57.58%	D. K. Kale	PSP	9,554	21.53%	15,999
227	Khed Alandi	62.93%	S. M. Satikar	INC	30,486	60.50%	D. B. Alias Mama	PSP	7,946	15.77%	22,540
228	Maval	69.84%	Raghunath Satkar	INC	19,525	42.86%	K. D. Bhegade	ABJS	19,066	41.85%	459
229	Mulshi	67.69%	N. S. Mohol	INC	35,513	72.64%	S. S. Konde	SSP	10,099	20.66%	25,414
230	Haveli	67.26%	Martand Dhondiba Magar	INC	36,656	61.25%	J. V. Bhosole	SSP	17,165	28.68%	19,491
231	Kasba Peth	75.02%	R. V. Telang	INC	22,567	48.27%	R. P. Vadake	SSP	18,398	39.35%	4,169
232	Bhavani Peth	68.49%	Tikamdas Daduram Memjade	INC	25,883	52.91%	M. B. Sawant	RPI	16,493	33.72%	9,390
233	Shukrawar Peth	76.00%	Rambhau Mhalgi	ABJS	31,265	57.38%	B. P. Apte	INC	14,146	25.96%	17,119
234	Shivajinagar	65.77%	B. D. Killedar	PWPI	23,509	52.59%	N. R. Mate	INC	15,747	35.23%	7,762
235	Pune Cantonment	64.90%	Krishnarao Tukaram Girme	INC	14,924	36.44%	Ram D. Tupe	SSP	12,972	31.67%	1,952
236	Shirur	54.74%	Shamkant Damodar More	PSP	16,814	47.43%	Raosaheb Baburao Pawar	INC	13,480	38.02%	3,334
237	Dhond	42.85%	P. J. Tatyaba	INC	14,099	41.98%	R. B. Takawane	Independent	3,090	9.20%	11,009
238	Indapur	70.32%	Shankarrao Bajirao Patil	INC	32,420	60.97%	G. A. Awate	PSP	20,124	37.85%	12,296
239	Baramati	74.14%	Sharad Pawar	INC	34,160	63.10%	B. S. Kakade	PWPI	17,801	32.88%	16,359
240	Purandar	59.17%	Dayaneshwar Raghunath Khalre	INC	26,841	55.64%	Vithal Sauloba Deshmukh	SSP	17,805	36.91%	9,036
241	Bhor	59.17%	S. M. Bhelke	INC	24,888	66.43%	Dadasaheb Anandrao Rajeshshirke	SSP	8,983	23.98%	15,905
242	Phaltan	75.61%	Krishnachandra Bhoite	INC	24,749	47.20%	V. M. Naiknimbalkar	Independent	22,979	43.82%	1,770
243	Man	58.54%	P. T. Sonawane	INC	26,554	55.94%	G. B. Mane	RPI	13,741	28.95%	12,813
244	Khatav	66.63%	R. G. Patil	INC	40,529	81.45%	S. S. Jadhav	CPI	6,357	12.78%	34,172
245	Kumbharwada	63.64%	Bhanushankar Manchharam Yagnik	INC	23,859	44.16%	J. S. Mahimkar	SSP	15,618	28.91%	8,241
246	Satara	72.18%	Dhondiram Shidoji Jagtap	INC	33,984	64.66%	N. R. Pawar	PWPI	14,228	27.07%	19,756
247	Wai	84.46%	Prataprao Baburao Bhosale	INC	33,106	71.59%	Dadasaheb Khasherao Jagtap	PWPI	7,918	17.12%	25,188
248	Jaoli	63.47%	Bnilare Bhiku Daji	INC	32,618	75.94%	K. H. Tarade	PWPI	4,466	10.40%	28,152
249	Patan		Balasaheb Desai	INC	Elected Unopposed						
250	Karad North	77.45%	Y. B. Patail	INC	35,285	59.12%	A. G. Pawar	PWPI	18,196	30.49%	17,089
251	Karad South	67.98%	Yashwantrao Mohite	INC	40,633	81.63%	R. R. Patil	CPI	9,142	18.37%	31,491
252	Shirala	69.59%	Vasantrao Anandrao Naik	INC	37,304	66.17%	Y. C. Patil	PWPI	10,164	18.03%	27,140
253	Walva	82.46%	Rajarambapu Patil	INC	41,202	63.79%	Narayan Dhyanu Patil	PWPI	22,903	35.46%	18,299
254	Khanapur	78.66%	Sampatrao Sitaram Mane	INC	25,727	42.96%	H. Y. Patil	Independent	22,981	38.37%	2,746
255	Tasgaon	79.67%	Patil Babasaheb Gopalrao	INC	38,595	55.39%	Ganpati Dada Lad	PWPI	29,177	41.88%	9,418
256	Sangli	76.95%	A. B. Birnale	INC	32,966	54.27%	K. A. Chougule	Independent	27,784	45.73%	5,182
257	Miraj	77.55%	Gundu Dasharath Patil	INC	29,853	52.15%	N. R. Pathak	Independent	26,586	46.44%	3,267
258	Kavathe Mahankal	58.07%	B. S. Kore	INC	33,404	62.37%	R. R. Deshmukh	Independent	5,875	10.97%	27,529
259	Jat	53.13%	Shivrudra T. Bamane	INC	28,023	62.82%	B. L. Pawar	Independent	14,497	32.50%	13,526
260	Shirol	87.58%	Ratnappa Kumbhar	INC	37,897	51.81%	Satgonda Revgonda Patil	Independent	35,057	47.93%	2,840
261	Hatkanangale	78.07%	B. Bhausaheb Kahanjire	INC	24,996	42.37%	S. A. Patil	Independent	17,946	30.42%	7,050
262	Vadgaon	61.65%	K. N. Ghatage	INC	20,845	39.29%	D. M. Shirke	RPI	17,424	32.84%	3,421
263	Shahuwadi	71.59%	Rau Dhondi Patil	PWPI	23,059	48.80%	U. N. Gaikwad	INC	21,817	46.17%	1,242
264	Panhala	69.80%	D. Yashwantrao Patil	INC	25,158	50.89%	Sadashiva Daulatrao Patil	PWPI	18,735	37.90%	6,423
265	Radhanagari	77.09%	G. T. Kalikate	PWPI	39,122	64.04%	B. K. Patil	INC	21,965	35.96%	17,157
266	Koregaon	72.19%	A. N. Phalke	INC	37,547	78.19%	P. N. Deshpande	SSP	10,476	21.81%	27,071
267	Karvir	75.51%	Shripatrao S. Bondre	INC	31,060	54.22%	R. R. Sabnis	SSP	25,343	44.24%	5,717
268	Kagal	73.29%	Daulatrao. A. Nikam	INC	32,789	55.48%	J. G. Sawant	Independent	26,307	44.52%	6,482
269	Gadhinglaj	70.80%	T. K. Kolekar	PWPI	23,687	47.41%	P. R. Nalawaderao	INC	19,881	39.79%	3,806
270	Chandgad	71.90%	V. K. Chavan Patil	INC	25,568	50.85%	Narsingrao Bhujang Patil	PWPI	23,058	45.86%	2,510
