= Janephal Assembly constituency =

Constituency of the Maharashtra legislative assembly in India

Janefal
- Former constituency for the Maharashtra Legislative Assembly

Constituency details
- Country: India
- Region: Western India
- State: Maharashtra
- Established: 1962
- Abolished: 1962
- Total electors: 69,688

Janefal Assembly constituency was an assembly constituency in the India state of Maharashtra.

== Members of the Legislative Assembly ==
Election	Member	Party
1962	Balwanta Piraji Wankhede	Indian National Congress

== Election results ==
=== Assembly Election 1962 ===
1962 Maharashtra Legislative Assembly election : Janefal
Party	Candidate	Votes	%	±%
INC	Balwanta Piraji Wankhede	16,920	44.14%	New
ABJS	Mahadu Yeshwanta Bhalerao	7,369	19.22%	New
RPI	Gopalrao Sakharam Jadhao	6,105	15.92%	New
Independent	Deorao Baburao Gaikwad	2,111	5.51%	New
Independent	Tulsiram Rodu Kankal	1,426	3.72%	New
Independent	Ashru Sakharam Borkar	943	2.46%	New
Margin of victory		9,551	24.91%	
Turnout		38,336	50.04%	
Registered electors		69,688		
INC win (new seat)				
