= Vengurla Assembly constituency =

Constituency of the Maharashtra legislative assembly in India

Vengurla
- Former constituency for the Maharashtra Legislative Assembly

Constituency details
- Country: India
- Region: Western India
- State: Maharashtra
- Established: 1952
- Abolished: 2008
- Total electors: 136,354

Vengurla Assembly constituency was an assembly constituency in the India state of Maharashtra.

== Members of the Legislative Assembly ==
Election	Member	Party
1952	Sawant Parsharam Krishnaji	Indian National Congress
1957	Chamankar Narayan Mahadeo	Praja Socialist Party
1962	Prataprao Deorao Bhonsale	Indian National Congress
1967	Pundalik Atmaram Kinalekar	Praja Socialist Party
1972	Sitaram Narayan Desai	Indian National Congress
1978	Pundalik Atmaram Kinalekar	Janata Party
1980	Sitaram Narayan Desai	Indian National Congress
1985	Pushpasen Sawant	Janata Party
1990	Pushpasen Sawant	Janata Dal
1995	Shankar Shivram Kambli	Shiv Sena
1999	Shankar Shivram Kambli	Shiv Sena
2004	Shankar Shivram Kambli	Shiv Sena
2006 By-election	Shankar Shivram Kambli	Indian National Congress

== Election results ==
=== Assembly By-election 2006 ===
2006 Maharashtra Legislative Assembly by-election : Vengurla
Party	Candidate	Votes	%	±%
INC	Kambali Shankar Shivram	65,290	80.45%	▲44.97
SS	Ramesh Naik	12,787	15.76%	▼39.91
Independent	Somnath Vasant Tomke	3,075	3.79%	New
Margin of victory		52,503	64.70%	▲44.51
Turnout		81,152	59.52%	▼4.93
Total valid votes		81,152		
Registered electors		136,354		▼1.13
INC gain from SS		Swing	▲24.78	

=== Assembly Election 2004 ===
2004 Maharashtra Legislative Assembly election : Vengurla
Party	Candidate	Votes	%	±%
SS	Shankar Shivram Kambli	49,474	55.67%	▲12.24
INC	Pushpasen Sawant	31,532	35.48%	▲9.32
Independent	Neeta Ranjit Rane	2,869	3.23%	New
BSP	Santhosh Deu Parab	1,233	1.39%	New
Independent	Tomke Somanath Vasant	1,145	1.29%	New
Margin of victory		17,942	20.19%	▲4.41
Turnout		88,876	64.45%	▲10.98
Total valid votes		88,872		
Registered electors		137,906		▲7.04
SS hold		Swing	▲12.24	

=== Assembly Election 1999 ===
1999 Maharashtra Legislative Assembly election : Vengurla
Party	Candidate	Votes	%	±%
SS	Kambali Shankar Shivram	28,391	43.43%	▲0.47
JD(S)	Pushpasen Sawant	18,073	27.65%	New
INC	Chamankar Jayprakash Narayan	17,100	26.16%	▲5.08
Independent	Shankar Pandurang Aravandekar	736	1.13%	New
Independent	Subhas Shirodkar	563	0.86%	New
ABS	Anand Malbari	509	0.78%	New
Margin of victory		10,318	15.78%	▼0.58
Turnout		68,893	53.47%	▼22.05
Total valid votes		65,372		
Registered electors		128,837		▼2.75
SS hold		Swing	▲0.47	

=== Assembly Election 1995 ===
1995 Maharashtra Legislative Assembly election : Vengurla
Party	Candidate	Votes	%	±%
SS	Kambali Shankar Shivram	41,961	42.96%	▲22.65
JD	Sawant Pushpasen Bhivaji	25,986	26.61%	▼27.51
INC	Parab Hiroji Devarao	20,594	21.08%	▼3.94
Independent	Parab Shridhar Chandroji	2,840	2.91%	New
Independent	Warang Bhalchandra Keshav	2,092	2.14%	New
Independent	Kamal Balkrishna Parulekar	1,804	1.85%	New
Independent	Prof. Mahendra Natekar	1,366	1.40%	New
BBM	Kadam Niranjan Dhaku	644	0.66%	New
Margin of victory		15,975	16.36%	▼12.74
Turnout		100,046	75.52%	▲9.38
Total valid votes		97,673		
Registered electors		132,482		▲6.02
SS gain from JD		Swing	▼11.16	

=== Assembly Election 1990 ===
1990 Maharashtra Legislative Assembly election : Vengurla
Party	Candidate	Votes	%	±%
JD	Pushpasen Sawant	43,946	54.12%	New
INC	Sitaram Narayan Desai	20,316	25.02%	▼9.74
SS	D. D. Desai	16,491	20.31%	New
Margin of victory		23,630	29.10%	▲23.52
Turnout		82,654	66.14%	▲6.40
Total valid votes		81,208		
Registered electors		124,961		▲19.51
JD gain from JP		Swing	▲13.78	

=== Assembly Election 1985 ===
1985 Maharashtra Legislative Assembly election : Vengurla
Party	Candidate	Votes	%	±%
JP	Pushpasen Sawant	24,766	40.34%	New
INC	Sharad Palav	21,338	34.76%	New
Independent	Sitaram Narayan Desai	8,736	14.23%	New
Independent	Jagannath Ramachandra Ghatwal	2,682	4.37%	New
Independent	Vasantrao Khot	1,786	2.91%	New
Independent	C. S. Gaonkar	858	1.40%	New
Independent	Narayan Vasudeo Pitre	670	1.09%	New
Margin of victory		3,428	5.58%	▲3.85
Turnout		62,464	59.74%	▲22.45
Total valid votes		61,389		
Registered electors		104,559		▲7.86
JP gain from INC(I)		Swing	▼6.39	

=== Assembly Election 1980 ===
1980 Maharashtra Legislative Assembly election : Vengurla
Party	Candidate	Votes	%	±%
INC(I)	Sitaram Narayan Desai	16,528	46.73%	▲44.58
JP	Bali Kinalekar	15,916	45.00%	New
Independent	Madhukar Balwant Sarnaik	2,128	6.02%	New
Independent	Vasant Gangavane	795	2.25%	New
Margin of victory		612	1.73%	▼44.21
Turnout		36,146	37.29%	▼30.48
Total valid votes		35,367		
Registered electors		96,937		▲2.03
INC(I) gain from JP		Swing	▼22.75	

=== Assembly Election 1978 ===
1978 Maharashtra Legislative Assembly election : Vengurla
Party	Candidate	Votes	%	±%
JP	Kinalkar Pundlik Atmaram	43,525	69.48%	New
INC	Sitaram Narayan Desai	14,743	23.53%	▼39.32
Independent	Datta Desai	3,032	4.84%	New
INC(I)	Deepak Shriguru Kubal	1,347	2.15%	New
Margin of victory		28,782	45.94%	▲8.00
Turnout		64,385	67.77%	▲3.80
Total valid votes		62,647		
Registered electors		95,004		▲29.02
JP gain from INC		Swing	▲6.63	

=== Assembly Election 1972 ===
1972 Maharashtra Legislative Assembly election : Vengurla
Party	Candidate	Votes	%	±%
INC	Sitaram Narayan Desai	28,655	62.85%	▲37.31
SSP	Pundalik A. Kinalekar	11,356	24.91%	New
INC(O)	Todankar Gunwant Atmaram	3,314	7.27%	New
RPI(K)	Jadhao Baburao Atmaram	1,195	2.62%	New
Independent	Patkar Ankush Wasudeo	1,073	2.35%	New
Margin of victory		17,299	37.94%	▲26.48
Turnout		47,105	63.97%	▲2.09
Total valid votes		45,593		
Registered electors		73,634		▲2.84
INC gain from PSP		Swing	▲21.70	

=== Assembly Election 1967 ===
1967 Maharashtra Legislative Assembly election : Vengurla
Party	Candidate	Votes	%	±%
PSP	Pundalik A. Kinalekar	16,594	41.15%	▲17.16
SSP	S. B. Naik	11,974	29.69%	New
INC	Prataprao Deorao Bhonsale	10,299	25.54%	▼13.66
Independent	Patkar Ankush Wasudeo	1,458	3.62%	New
Margin of victory		4,620	11.46%	▲1.47
Turnout		44,308	61.88%	▲2.27
Total valid votes		40,325		
Registered electors		71,601		▲13.93
PSP gain from INC		Swing	▲1.95	

=== Assembly Election 1962 ===
1962 Maharashtra Legislative Assembly election : Vengurla
Party	Candidate	Votes	%	±%
INC	Prataprao Deorao Bhonsale	13,349	39.20%	▲27.42
Independent	Balasaheb Hanamantrao Khardekar	9,948	29.21%	New
PSP	Narayan Mahadeo Chamankar	8,169	23.99%	▼50.48
ABJS	Wasudeo Balkrishna Moraje	2,586	7.59%	New
Margin of victory		3,401	9.99%	▼50.74
Turnout		37,462	59.61%	▲8.54
Total valid votes		34,052		
Registered electors		62,847		▲7.75
INC gain from PSP		Swing	▼35.27	

=== Assembly Election 1957 ===
1957 Bombay State Legislative Assembly election : Vengurla
Party	Candidate	Votes	%	±%
PSP	Chamankar Narayan Mahadeo	22,183	74.47%	New
Independent	Bhende Dattaram Sakharam	4,093	13.74%	New
INC	Walavalkar Ganpat Mahadeo	3,510	11.78%	▼27.10
Margin of victory		18,090	60.73%	▲47.80
Turnout		29,786	51.07%	▲0.81
Total valid votes		29,786		
Registered electors		58,326		▲7.45
PSP gain from INC		Swing	▲35.59	

=== Assembly Election 1952 ===
1952 Bombay State Legislative Assembly election : Vengurla
Party	Candidate	Votes	%	±%
INC	Sawant Parsharam Krishnaji	10,608	38.88%	New
Socialist	Varadkar Madhukar Vithal	7,080	25.95%	New
PWPI	Gavde Raghunath Fatu	5,133	18.82%	New
Independent	Parab Deorao Hire	4,460	16.35%	New
Margin of victory		3,528	12.93%	
Turnout		27,281	50.26%	
Total valid votes		27,281		
Registered electors		54,283		
INC win (new seat)				
