= Kumbharwada Assembly constituency =

Constituency of the Maharashtra legislative assembly in India

Kumbharwada
- Former constituency for the Maharashtra Legislative Assembly

Constituency details
- Country: India
- Region: Western India
- State: Maharashtra
- Established: 1957
- Abolished: 1978
- Total electors: 78,457

Kumbharwada Assembly constituency was an assembly constituency in the India state of Maharashtra.

== Members of the Legislative Assembly ==
Election	Member	Party
1957	Bhanushankar Manchharam Yagnik	Indian National Congress
1962	Bhanushankar Manchharam Yagnik	Indian National Congress
1967	Bhanushankar Manchharam Yagnik	Indian National Congress
1972	Bukhari Z. Burhanuddin	Independent politician

== Election results ==
=== Assembly Election 1972 ===
1972 Maharashtra Legislative Assembly election : Kumbharwada
Party	Candidate	Votes	%	±%
Independent	Bukhari Z. Burhanuddin	18,145	37.03%	New
INC	Chagla Shaukat Currimbhoy	16,058	32.77%	▼11.39
INC(O)	Shah Chhotalal Nanchand	10,152	20.72%	New
SSP	Sharad Rao	3,543	7.23%	New
Margin of victory		2,087	4.26%	▼10.99
Turnout		49,006	61.64%	▼3.57
Registered electors		78,457		▼4.11
Independent gain from INC		Swing	▼7.13	

=== Assembly Election 1967 ===
1967 Maharashtra Legislative Assembly election : Kumbharwada
Party	Candidate	Votes	%	±%
INC	Bhanushankar Manchharam Yagnik	23,859	44.16%	▼8.42
SSP	J. S. Mahimkar	15,618	28.91%	New
ABJS	V. G. Gupta	8,663	16.03%	▲11.92
Independent	M. A. Dhorajiwala	1,072	1.98%	New
PSP	V. Parekh	1,072	1.98%	▼31.36
SWA	M. P. Kalandan	959	1.78%	New
Independent	C. N. Patel	651	1.20%	New
Margin of victory		8,241	15.25%	▼3.99
Turnout		54,028	63.64%	▲5.99
Registered electors		81,816		▼2.68
INC hold		Swing	▼8.42	

=== Assembly Election 1962 ===
1962 Maharashtra Legislative Assembly election : Kumbharwada
Party	Candidate	Votes	%	±%
INC	Bhanushankar Manchharam Yagnik	26,545	52.58%	▼14.47
PSP	Shantilal Girdharlal Patel	16,833	33.35%	New
Independent	Amathalal Virchan Panchal	2,633	5.22%	New
ABJS	Surajbhan Ramcharanlal Garg	2,077	4.11%	New
Margin of victory		9,712	19.24%	▼19.31
Turnout		50,481	57.20%	▼2.30
Registered electors		84,070		▲13.80
INC hold		Swing	▼14.47	

=== Assembly Election 1957 ===
1957 Bombay State Legislative Assembly election : Kumbharwada
Party	Candidate	Votes	%	±%
INC	Bhanushankar Manchharam Yagnik	30,881	67.05%	New
Independent	Pupala Parshuram Shankar	13,128	28.50%	New
Independent	Vaidya Madhukar Wamanrao	2,048	4.45%	New
Margin of victory		17,753	38.55%	
Turnout		46,057	62.35%	
Registered electors		73,872		
INC win (new seat)				
