= Sadak Arjuni Assembly constituency =

Constituency of the Maharashtra legislative assembly in India

Sadak Arjuni
- Former constituency for the Maharashtra Legislative Assembly

Constituency details
- Country: India
- Region: Western India
- State: Maharashtra
- Established: 1961
- Abolished: 1962
- Total electors: 76,744
- Reservation: SC

Sadak Arjuni Assembly constituency was an assembly constituency in the India state of Maharashtra.

== Members of the Legislative Assembly ==
Election	Member	Party
1962	Shrawan Mangruji Kanhekar	Indian National Congress

== Election results ==
=== Assembly Election 1962 ===
1962 Maharashtra Legislative Assembly election : Sadak Arjuni
Party	Candidate	Votes	%	±%
INC	Shrawan Mangruji Kanhekar	13,111	33.09%	New
RPI	Maroti Waktu Sahkare	12,224	30.85%	New
ABJS	Sohanlal Tikaram Kulbhaje	7,369	18.60%	New
Independent	Durwalu Sampat Shahare	1,629	4.11%	New
Independent	Pancham Chamru Nagdavane	1,491	3.76%	New
Independent	Sadasheo Langda Selokar	332	0.84%	New
Margin of victory		887	2.24%	
Turnout		39,624	47.11%	
Registered electors		76,744		
INC win (new seat)				
