= Peint Assembly constituency =

Constituency of the Maharashtra legislative assembly in India

Peint
- Former constituency for the Maharashtra Legislative Assembly

Constituency details
- Country: India
- Region: Western India
- State: Maharashtra
- Established: 1962
- Abolished: 1962
- Total electors: 56,932

Peint Assembly constituency was an assembly constituency in the India state of Maharashtra.

== Members of the Legislative Assembly ==
Election	Member	Party
1962	Kacharu Bhau Raut	Indian National Congress

== Election results ==
=== Assembly Election 1962 ===
1962 Maharashtra Legislative Assembly election : Peint
Party	Candidate	Votes	%	±%
INC	Kacharu Bhau Raut	9,475	36.56%	New
Independent	Sitaram Sayaji Bhoye	8,308	32.06%	New
PWPI	Shankar Bhikaji Potinde	5,928	22.87%	New
Margin of victory		1,167	4.50%	
Turnout		25,916	41.65%	
Registered electors		56,932		
INC win (new seat)				
