= Bhagur Assembly constituency =

Constituency of the Maharashtra legislative assembly in India

Bhagur
- Former constituency for the Maharashtra Legislative Assembly

Constituency details
- Country: India
- Region: Western India
- State: Maharashtra
- Established: 1962
- Abolished: 1967
- Total electors: 56,303
- Reservation: SC

Bhagur Assembly constituency was an assembly constituency in the India state of Maharashtra.

== Members of the Legislative Assembly ==
Election	Member	Party
1962	Dattaraya Tulsiram Kale	Indian National Congress
1964 By-election	A. T. Kale	Indian National Congress

== Election results ==
=== Assembly By-election 1964 ===
1964 Maharashtra Legislative Assembly by-election : Bhagur
Party	Candidate	Votes	%	±%
INC	A. T. Kale	15,607		
RPI	B. Duttumanji	9,862		
Margin of victory		5,745		
Turnout				
Total valid votes		0		
INC hold		Swing		

=== Assembly Election 1962 ===
1962 Maharashtra Legislative Assembly election : Bhagur
Party	Candidate	Votes	%	±%
INC	Dattaraya Tulsiram Kale	16,289	58.31%	New
RPI	Janardan Sambhaji Unawane	8,462	30.29%	New
ABJS	Tulshiram Dadaji Pawar	2,226	7.97%	New
Independent	Shiwaji Gangaram Kale	959	3.43%	New
Margin of victory		7,827	28.02%	
Turnout		29,653	52.67%	
Total valid votes		27,936		
Registered electors		56,303		
INC win (new seat)				
