= Sangameshwar Assembly constituency =

Constituency of the Maharashtra legislative assembly in India

Sangameshwar
- Former constituency for the Maharashtra Legislative Assembly

Constituency details
- Country: India
- Region: Western India
- State: Maharashtra
- Established: 1952
- Abolished: 2008
- Total electors: 152,433

Sangameshwar Assembly constituency was an assembly constituency in the India state of Maharashtra.

== Members of the Legislative Assembly ==
Election	Member	Party
1952	Shirke Ramdas Bhausaheb	Indian National Congress
1957	Vichare Arjun Bapuji	Independent politician
1962	Jayaram Balkrishna Shetye Alias Bhai Shetye	Praja Socialist Party
1967	Bhuwad Laxmibai Babaji	Indian National Congress
1972	Bhuwad Laxmibai Babaji	Indian National Congress
1978	Jagannathrao Jadhav	Janata Party
1980	Jagannathrao Jadhav	Janata Party
1985	Musa Alli Modak	Indian National Congress
1990	Ravindra Muralidhar Mane	Shiv Sena
1995	Ravindra Muralidhar Mane	Shiv Sena
1999	Ravindra Muralidhar Mane	Shiv Sena
2004	Bane Subhash Shantaram	Shiv Sena
2006 By-election	Bane Subhash Shantaram	Indian National Congress

== Election results ==
=== Assembly By-election 2006 ===
2006 Maharashtra Legislative Assembly by-election : Sangameshwar
Party	Candidate	Votes	%	±%
INC	Bane Subhash Shantaram	43,081	41.25%	▲21.84
SS	Ravindra Muralidhar Mane	33,708	32.28%	▼20.87
Independent	Suresh Laxman Bhayje	24,312	23.28%	New
Independent	Kamble Sandeep Bandu	1,477	1.41%	New
ABHM	Pramila Bharati	1,251	1.20%	New
Margin of victory		9,373	8.98%	▼23.40
Turnout		104,431	68.51%	▼0.17
Total valid votes		104,428		
Registered electors		152,433		▲0.35
INC gain from SS		Swing	▼11.90	

=== Assembly Election 2004 ===
2004 Maharashtra Legislative Assembly election : Sangameshwar
Party	Candidate	Votes	%	±%
SS	Bane Subhash Shantaram	55,431	53.15%	▲9.80
Independent	Bhayaje Suresh Laxman	21,662	20.77%	New
INC	Husain Dalwai	20,246	19.41%	▲8.84
BBM	C. A. Jadhav	3,396	3.26%	New
BSP	Santosh Kashiram Kadam	2,449	2.35%	New
Independent	Jadhav Yashavant Sakharam	1,114	1.07%	New
Margin of victory		33,769	32.38%	▲12.87
Turnout		104,328	68.68%	▲5.35
Total valid votes		104,298		
Registered electors		151,905		▲6.85
SS hold		Swing	▲9.80	

=== Assembly Election 1999 ===
1999 Maharashtra Legislative Assembly election : Sangameshwar
Party	Candidate	Votes	%	±%
SS	Ravindra Muralidhar Mane	35,107	43.35%	▼8.56
Independent	Bane Subhash Shantaram	19,310	23.85%	New
NCP	Desai Rajendra Yashawant	10,383	12.82%	New
INC	Surve Sunil Shrikant	8,556	10.57%	▼19.26
Independent	Madhukar Shivram Baing	7,623	9.41%	New
Margin of victory		15,797	19.51%	▼2.57
Turnout		90,037	63.33%	▼13.30
Total valid votes		80,979		
Registered electors		142,163		▼0.25
SS hold		Swing	▼8.56	

=== Assembly Election 1995 ===
1995 Maharashtra Legislative Assembly election : Sangameshwar
Party	Candidate	Votes	%	±%
SS	Ravindra Muralidhar Mane	54,655	51.91%	▲11.76
INC	Rakhangi Mohammed Shaikh Hussain	31,409	29.83%	▲4.01
JD	Ashok Jadhav	8,408	7.99%	▼19.47
BBM	Kazi Riyaz Usman Alias M. R. Kazi	2,893	2.75%	New
Independent	Kelkar Narayan Keshav	2,019	1.92%	New
Independent	Gamare Vishrm Somaji	1,630	1.55%	New
Independent	Gholam Vishnu Dhondu	1,249	1.19%	New
Independent	Alawani Gurudas Anant	1,075	1.02%	New
Margin of victory		23,246	22.08%	▲9.39
Turnout		109,209	76.63%	▲12.79
Total valid votes		105,280		
Registered electors		142,513		▲9.73
SS hold		Swing	▲11.76	

=== Assembly Election 1990 ===
1990 Maharashtra Legislative Assembly election : Sangameshwar
Party	Candidate	Votes	%	±%
SS	Ravindra Muralidhar Mane	32,385	40.15%	New
JD	Jagannath Jadhav	22,151	27.46%	New
INC	M. D. Naik	20,827	25.82%	▼20.02
Independent	Anant Gangaram Gite	2,452	3.04%	New
Independent	Jadhav Jagannath Ravji	1,555	1.93%	New
Independent	Ayare Anant Ramchandra	1,294	1.60%	New
Margin of victory		10,234	12.69%	▲9.06
Turnout		82,906	63.84%	▲8.29
Total valid votes		80,664		
Registered electors		129,871		▲17.62
SS gain from INC		Swing	▼5.69	

=== Assembly Election 1985 ===
1985 Maharashtra Legislative Assembly election : Sangameshwar
Party	Candidate	Votes	%	±%
INC	Musa Alli Modak	27,282	45.84%	New
JP	Jagannath Jadhav	25,119	42.20%	New
Independent	Mohite Ramchandra Laxman	3,034	5.10%	New
Independent	Ramachandra Humane	2,247	3.78%	New
Independent	Anant R. Ayare	1,837	3.09%	New
Margin of victory		2,163	3.63%	▼34.42
Turnout		61,335	55.55%	▲11.89
Total valid votes		59,519		
Registered electors		110,413		▲5.81
INC gain from JP		Swing	▼15.77	

=== Assembly Election 1980 ===
1980 Maharashtra Legislative Assembly election : Sangameshwar
Party	Candidate	Votes	%	±%
JP	Jagannathrao Jadhav	27,252	61.61%	New
INC(I)	Laxmibai Bhuvad	10,423	23.56%	New
BJP	Chalke Ashok Raghunath	4,989	11.28%	New
Independent	Jayant Ambardekar	1,567	3.54%	New
Margin of victory		16,829	38.05%	▼9.77
Turnout		45,560	43.66%	▼19.29
Total valid votes		44,231		
Registered electors		104,352		▲4.69
JP gain from JP		Swing	▼5.96	

=== Assembly Election 1978 ===
1978 Maharashtra Legislative Assembly election : Sangameshwar
Party	Candidate	Votes	%	±%
JP	Jagannath Jadhav	40,263	67.57%	New
INC	Bhuwad Laxmibai Babaji	11,770	19.75%	▼34.71
RPI	Kambale Gangaram Bhikaji	2,233	3.75%	New
Independent	Sawant Shivajirao Shivaram	1,362	2.29%	New
Independent	Bhinde Yeshwant Padmakar	1,293	2.17%	New
Independent	Dabholkar Sitaram Laxman	1,126	1.89%	New
Independent	Kadam Raghunath Shankar	857	1.44%	New
Independent	Sutar Namdev Ganpat	680	1.14%	New
Margin of victory		28,493	47.82%	▲16.15
Turnout		62,750	62.95%	▲13.51
Total valid votes		59,584		
Registered electors		99,681		▲14.50
JP gain from INC		Swing	▲13.11	

=== Assembly Election 1972 ===
1972 Maharashtra Legislative Assembly election : Sangameshwar
Party	Candidate	Votes	%	±%
INC	Bhuwad Laxmibai Babaji	21,952	54.46%	▲15.96
ABJS	Bhide S. Dattatray	9,186	22.79%	▲0.40
SSP	Anerao Manohar Subhanrao	7,803	19.36%	New
Independent	Shekasan Mohammed Daud	1,364	3.38%	New
Margin of victory		12,766	31.67%	▲15.56
Turnout		43,038	49.44%	▼5.73
Total valid votes		40,305		
Registered electors		87,054		▲10.76
INC hold		Swing	▲15.96	

=== Assembly Election 1967 ===
1967 Maharashtra Legislative Assembly election : Sangameshwar
Party	Candidate	Votes	%	±%
INC	Bhuwad Laxmibai Babaji	15,231	38.50%	▲6.34
ABJS	S. D. Bhide	8,859	22.39%	New
PSP	J. B. Shetye	6,139	15.52%	▼18.96
SSP	A. K. Patankar	4,493	11.36%	New
Independent	T. D. Gamare	3,752	9.48%	New
SWA	R. R. Lotankar	1,084	2.74%	New
Margin of victory		6,372	16.11%	▲13.79
Turnout		43,363	55.17%	▲24.02
Total valid votes		39,558		
Registered electors		78,594		▲18.04
INC gain from PSP		Swing	▲4.02	

=== Assembly Election 1962 ===
1962 Maharashtra Legislative Assembly election : Sangameshwar
Party	Candidate	Votes	%	±%
PSP	Jayaram Balkrishna Shetye Alias Bhai Shetye	6,211	34.48%	New
INC	Dhondiram Krishnaji Ghag	5,793	32.16%	▲10.48
ABJS	Parshuram Ambaji Parab	3,706	20.57%	New
RPI	Laxman Kamu Tambe	1,793	9.95%	New
Independent	Hussain Mohiddin Mukadam	512	2.84%	New
Margin of victory		418	2.32%	▼13.97
Turnout		20,742	31.15%	▼4.87
Total valid votes		18,015		
Registered electors		66,582		▲8.31
PSP gain from Independent		Swing	▼12.82	

=== Assembly Election 1957 ===
1957 Bombay State Legislative Assembly election : Sangameshwar
Party	Candidate	Votes	%	±%
Independent	Vichare Arjun Bapuji	10,476	47.30%	New
PWPI	Salvi Vinayak Shivaram	6,869	31.02%	▲20.21
INC	Shirke Ramdas Bhausaheb	4,801	21.68%	▼31.07
Margin of victory		3,607	16.29%	▼15.04
Turnout		22,146	36.02%	▼8.43
Total valid votes		22,146		
Registered electors		61,474		▲6.49
Independent gain from INC		Swing	▼5.45	

=== Assembly Election 1952 ===
1952 Bombay State Legislative Assembly election : Sangameshwar
Party	Candidate	Votes	%	±%
INC	Shirke Ramdas Bhausaheb	13,535	52.75%	New
Socialist	Vichare Arjun Bapuji	5,495	21.42%	New
PWPI	Jadhav Shridhar Jiwajirao	2,774	10.81%	New
ABHM	Bhide Hari Bhaskar	2,083	8.12%	New
Independent	Ghavali Gangaram Hari	1,233	4.81%	New
Independent	Bhide Yeshwant Padmakar	539	2.10%	New
Margin of victory		8,040	31.33%	
Turnout		25,659	44.45%	
Total valid votes		25,659		
Registered electors		57,725		
INC win (new seat)				
