= Nagpur IV Assembly constituency =

Constituency of the Maharashtra legislative assembly in India

Nagpur IV
- Former constituency for the Maharashtra Legislative Assembly

Constituency details
- Country: India
- Region: Western India
- State: Maharashtra
- Established: 1951
- Abolished: 1955
- Total electors: 87,672
- Reservation: SC

Nagpur IV Assembly constituency was an assembly constituency in the India state of Maharashtra. After the 1955 Delimitation act, it was split into Nagpur Central, Nagpur and Narkhed constituencies.

== Members of the Legislative Assembly ==
Election	Member	Party
1952	Vinayak Jagnnath Changole	Indian National Congress
1952	Mancharsha Rustomji Awari	Kisan Mazdoor Praja Party

== Election results ==
=== Assembly Election 1952 ===
1952 Hyderabad State Legislative Assembly election : Nagpur IV
Party	Candidate	Votes	%	±%
INC	Vinayak Jagnnath Changole	19,069	21.38%	New
KMPP	Mancharsha Rustomji Awari	16,922	18.97%	New
Socialist	Shamnarayan Kashmiri	14,695	16.47%	New
SCF	Haridas Damaji	14,345	16.08%	New
INC	Narayan Shrawan Chhaparghade	13,333	14.95%	New
ABJS	Pandurangpat Vithalrao Sawarkar	3,489	3.91%	New
CPI	Shaligram Tukaram Masurkar	1,972	2.21%	New
Independent	Vithalrao Haibatrao Kale	1,549	1.74%	New
Bolshevik Party of India	Waman Jangloe Bhalekar	1,077	1.21%	New
Independent	Medgulal Bhodilal Tambhurkar	848	0.95%	New
Margin of victory		2,147	2.41%	
Turnout		89,198	101.74%	
Total valid votes		89,198		
Registered electors		87,672		
INC win (new seat)				
