= 1957 Bombay State Legislative Assembly election =

State assembly election in India

1957 Bombay Legislative Assembly election
- 25 February 1957

All 396 seats in the Bombay Legislative Assembly 199 seats needed for a majority
- Registered: 24,458,722
- Turnout: 53.16% (▲2.38%)
	Majority party	Minority party	Third party
	INC	PSP	PWPI
Party	INC	PSP	Peasants and Workers Party of India
Seats before	269	New
Seats won	234	36	31
Seat change	▼35	▲27	▲17
Popular vote	81,31,604	14,98,700	11,13,436
Percentage	48.66%	8.97%	6.66%
CM before election
Yashwantrao Balwantrao Chavan
INC
Elected CM
Yashwantrao Balwantrao Chavan
INC

Elections to the Bombay Legislative Assembly were held on 25 February 1957. 1146 candidates contested for the 339 constituencies in the Assembly. There were 57 two-member constituencies and 282 single-member constituencies.

The incumbent Indian National Congress won reelection, with Yashwantrao Chavan continuing as Chief Minister. Despite suffering a decrease in seats, the incumbent government retained its simple majority in the legislative assembly.

== State reorganization ==
On 1 November 1956, under States Reorganisation Act, 1956, Bombay state was enlarged by the addition of Saurashtra state and Kutch state, the Marathi-speaking districts of Nagpur Division of Madhya Pradesh, and the Marathi speaking Marathwada region of Hyderabad. The state's southernmost Kannada-speaking districts of Dharwad, Bijapur, North Kannada and Belgaum (excluding the Chandgad taluka) were transferred to Mysore state, while Abu Road taluk of the Banaskantha district was transferred to Rajasthan. Hence the constituencies increased from 315 to 396 in 1957 elections.

== Results ==
List of Political Parties participated in 1957 Bombay Assembly Elections.

Party	Abbreviation
National Parties
Akhil Bharatiya Jana Sangh	BJS
Indian National Congress	INC
Praja Socialist Party	PSP
Communist Party of India	CPI
State Parties
Akhil Bharatiya Hindu Mahasabha	HMS
Akhil Bharatiya Ram Rajya Parishad	RRP
Peasants and Workers Party	PWP
All India Scheduled Castes Federation	SCF

Summary of results of the 1957 Bombay Legislative Assembly election
Political party	Flag	Seats Contested	Won	Net change in seats	Votes	Vote %	Change in vote %
Indian National Congress 234 / 396 (59%)		396	234	▼36	81,31,604	48.66%	▼1.29%
Praja Socialist Party 36 / 396 (9%)		98	36	▲27 (from SP)	14,98,700	8.97%	▼2.99% (from SP)
Peasants and Workers Party of India 31 / 396 (8%)		55	31	▲17	11,13,436	6.66%	▲0.21%
Scheduled Castes Federation 13 / 396 (3%)		48	13	▲12	10,41,355	6.23%	▲3.13%
Communist Party of India 13 / 396 (3%)		32	13	▲12	6,07,383	3.63%	▲2.19%
Bharatiya Jana Sangh 4 / 396 (1%)		23	4	▲4	2,60,826	1.56%	▲1.52%
Akhil Bharatiya Hindu Mahasabha 1 / 396 (0.3%)		10	1	▲1	71,514	0.43%	▲0.11%
Akhil Bharatiya Ram Rajya Parishad		10	0	Steady	14,794	0.09%	▼1.03%
Independent 64 / 396 (16%)		400	64	▲45	39,72,548	23.77%	▲7.53%
Total		1072	396	▲81	Turnout (Voters) 1,67,12,160 (3,14,40,079)	53.16%	▲2.38%

== Elected members ==
=== Gujarat ===
Constituency	Reserved for (SC/ST/None)	Member	Party
Gujarat State
Abadasa	None	Vaidya Jamiyatray Gulabshanker	Indian National Congress
Bhuj	None	Kundanlal Jaswantlal Dholakia	Indian National Congress
Mandvi	None	Jumakhlal Lakhmichand	Indian National Congress
Anjar	None	Premji Bhavanji Thacker	Indian National Congress
Vagad	None	Trilochana Ushakant Mehta	Indian National Congress
Dhrangadhra	None	Desai Bhupatbhai Vrajlal	Indian National Congress
Surendranagar	SC	Parikh Rasiklal Umedchand	Indian National Congress
Surendranagar	SC	Parmar Pethabhai Ganeshbhai	Indian National Congress
Halvad	None	Dave Trambaklal Mohanlal	Indian National Congress
Morvi	None	Parmar Gokaldas Dosabhai	Indian National Congress
Wankaner	None	Sheth Hiralaxmi Keshavlal	Indian National Congress
Rajkot	None	Shah Jaysukhlal Karshanji	Indian National Congress
Jasdan	None	Jasdanwala Akbarali Amiji	Indian National Congress
Kunkavav	SC	Vaghela Tapubhai Pragji	Indian National Congress
Kunkavav	SC	Ranvani Devsibhai Nanjibhai	Indian National Congress
Jetpur	None	Joshi Gajanand Bhavanishanker	Indian National Congress
Dhoraji	None	Kalaria Bhagwanji Bhanji	Indian National Congress
Jamnagar	None	Dave Manjulaben Jayantilal	Indian National Congress
Jodiya	None	Kantilal Premchand Shah	Indian National Congress
Jamjodhpur	None	Sinojia Nanji Devji	Indian National Congress
Bhanvad	None	Nakum Harilal Ramji	Indian National Congress
Dwarka	None	Meswania Bhudarji Dosabhai	Indian National Congress
Porbandar	None	Odedra Maldevji Mandlikji	Indian National Congress
Kutiyana	None	Bhupta Mathuradas Gordhandas	Indian National Congress
Mangrol	SC	Vikani Ramji Parbat	Indian National Congress
Mangrol	SC	Bhaskar Haribhai Ranabhai	Indian National Congress
Somnath	None	Solanki Hamir Sarman	Indian National Congress
Malia	None	Mori Kanji Kachara	Indian National Congress
Junagadh	None	Mehta Pushpaben Janardan	Indian National Congress
Visavadar	None	Kathrecha Parmananddas Jivanbhai	Indian National Congress
Una	None	Adani Ratubhai Mulshanker	Indian National Congress
Amreli	None	Mehta Jivraj Narayan	Indian National Congress
Rajula	None	Varu Suragbhai Kalubhai	Indian National Congress
Kundla	None	Khimani Amlukhrai Kushalchand	Indian National Congress
Lathi	None	Bhatt Hariprasad Vishvanath	Indian National Congress
Botad	None	Gopani Chhaganbhai Laljibhai	Indian National Congress
Bhavnagar	None	Vora Vrajlal Gokaldas	Indian National Congress
Vallabhipur	None	Bharodia Karsanbhai Jerambhai	Indian National Congress
Palitana	None	Indrani Kasturben Jorsinhbhai	Indian National Congress
Mahuva	None	Mehta Jasvantrai Nanubhai	Praja Socialist Party
Talaja	None	Indrani Jorsinh Kasalbhai	Indian National Congress
Tharad	None	Mehta Dahyalal Manilal	Indian National Congress
Kankrej	None	Solanki Joitaram Ajaji	Indian National Congress
Deesa	None	Solanki Joitaram Ajaji	Indian National Congress
Deesa	None	Parmar Gamanbhai Nanji	Indian National Congress
Palanpur	ST	Parmar Dungarbhai Bhagwanbhai	Indian National Congress
Palanpur	ST	Patel Galbabhai Nanjibhai	Indian National Congress
Bhiloda	ST	Parmar Khimjibhai Rupabhai	Indian National Congress
Bhiloda	ST	Taral Dita Marta	Independent
Idar	ST	Mehta Vadilal Premchand	Indian National Congress
Idar	ST	Bhambhi Govindbhai Manabhai	Indian National Congress
Bayad	None	Rahevar Lalusing Kishorsing	Independent
Prantij	None	Vora Ranjanben Madhukumar	Indian National Congress
Vijapur North	None	Raval Gangaram Chunilal	Independent
Vijapur South	None	Patel Bechardas Hargovandas	Independent
Kalol	None	Thakarda Shankerji Maganji	Independent
Kadi	None	Patel Chhootalal Maganlal	Independent
Mehsana	None	Patel Popatlal Gulabdas	Independent
Visnagar	None	Maniar Ramaniklal Trikamlal	Independent
Kheralu	None	Patel Natwarlal Maganlal	Independent
Sidhpur	None	Patel Mafatlal Motilal	Independent
Patan	SC	Shah Chimanlal Wadilal	Independent
Patan	SC	Bhankharia Laxmanbhai Shamjibhai	Independent
Radhanpur	None	Vakharia Maneklal Nathalal	Indian National Congress
Chanasma	None	Patel Khodabhai Shivram	Independent
Dhandhuka	None	Patel Dwarkadas Amratlal	Independent
Dholka	None	Shah Maneklal Chunilal	Indian National Congress
Viramgam	None	Desai Dilipsinghji Pratapsinghji	Independent
Sanand	None	Mehta Vardhmanbhai Lalbhai	Independent
Dehgam	None	Amin Chaturbhai Mangalbhai	Independent
Daskroi	None	Patel Chhotalal Narandas	Independent
Ahmedabad	None	Mehta Bhavanishankar Bapuji	Indian National Congress
Ellis Bridge	None	Patel Ganpatram Gokaldas	Independent
Dariapur Kazipur	None	Vyas Mohanlal Popatlal	Indian National Congress
Kalupur	None	Dalal Jayantilal Ghelabhai	Independent
Khadia	None	Bhat Brahmakumar Ranchhodlal	Independent
Jamalpur	None	Shaikh Ahmedmia Sherumia	Independent
Gomtipur	SC	Parmar Jesingji Govindbhai	Indian National Congress
Gomtipur	SC	Vasavda Shamprasad Rupshanker	Indian National Congress
Cambay	None	Nawab Mirza Husein Yawarkhan	Indian National Congress
Borsad South	None	Solanki Madhavsinh Fulsinh	Indian National Congress
Borsad North	None	Patel Shivabhai Ashabhai	Indian National Congress
Anand South	None	Patel Kamlaben Maganbhai	Indian National Congress
Anand North	None	Patel Purshotamdas Talshibhai	Independent
Petlad	None	Parikh Manilal Parbhulal	Indian National Congress
Matar	None	Shah Madhavlal Bhailal	Indian National Congress
Kaira	None	Patel Ramanlal Nagjibhai	Independent
Nadiad South	None	Desai Mahendrabhai Gopaldas	Independent
Nadiad North	None	Vadodia Udesinh Virsinh	Indian National Congress
Kapadwanj	None	Gandhi Nagindas Vadilal	Independent
Thasra	SC	Dave Khushalbhai Morarbhai	Indian National Congress
Thasra	SC	Gohil Kishorsinh Chhagusinh	Independent
Santrampur	ST	Ninama Hirabar Lalchandbhai	Indian National Congress
Lunawada	None	Bhatt Shivprasad Bapulal	Independent
Shehra	None	Parmar Dalabhai Raijibhai	Indian National Congress
Godhra	None	Pratapsing Motising	Indian National Congress
Halol	None	Chauhan Vijaysinhji Bharatsinhji	Indian National Congress
Baria	None	Pandya Jayantkumar Kashiram	Independent
Limkheda	ST	Nisarta Virsingbhai Kanjibhai	Indian National Congress
Jhalod	ST	Hathila Narsinhbhai Kanjibhai	Indian National Congress
Dohad	ST	Solanki Javsing Mansing	Indian National Congress
Chhota Udepur	ST	Patel Bhagwanbhai Ranchhod	Indian National Congress
Chhota Udepur	ST	Bhaijibhai Garbad	Indian National Congress
Naswadi	ST	Bhil Gordhan Chhipa	Indian National Congress
Karjan	None	Patel Maniben Chandubhai	Indian National Congress
Dabhoi	None	Shah Ambalal Chhotalal	Indian National Congress
Savli	SC	Amin Jashbhai Hathibhai	Indian National Congress
Savli	SC	Solanki Ramchandra Chhitabhai	Indian National Congress
Baroda City East	None	Chokshi Nanabhai Dahyabhai	Indian National Congress
Baroda City West	None	Contractor Bhailalbhai Garbaddas	Indian National Congress
Padra	None	Shah Jaswantlal Sobhagyachand	Indian National Congress
Jambusar	None	Patel Chhotubhai Makanbhai	Indian National Congress
Vagra	None	Mansinhji Bhasaheb Tha. Sa.	Indian National Congress
Broach	None	Modi Bhupendrabhai Bapalal	Independent
Nandod	None	Bhil Dalpat Buchar	Indian National Congress
Jhagadia	None	Vasawa Dalpatbhai Amarsinh	Indian National Congress
Ankleshwar	None	Mahida Harisinh Bhagubawa	Indian National Congress
Surat City East	None	Desai Ishvarlal Gulabbhai	Indian National Congress
Surat City West	None	Golandaz Mohmad Husain Abdul Samad	Indian National Congress
Chorasi	None	Bhatt Kikiben Alias Urmilaben	Indian National Congress
Navsari	ST	Rathod Bhanabhai Dahyabhai	Indian National Congress
Navsari	ST	Patel Lalloobhai Makanji	Indian National Congress
Bardoli	None	Mehta Kalyanjibhai Vithalbhai	Indian National Congress
Mangrol	None	Desai Hitendra Kanaiyalal	Indian National Congress
Kamrej	ST	Patel Prabhubhai Dhanabhai	Indian National Congress
Songadh	ST	Chodhari Mavjibhai Chimabhai	Indian National Congress
Bansda	ST	Patel Bahadurbhai Kuthabhai	Indian National Congress
Dharampur	ST	Jadav Ramu Balu	Praja Socialist Party
Chikhli	ST	Patel Shantaben Kalidas	Indian National Congress
Bulsar	SC	Rathod Naranbhai Madhavbhai	Indian National Congress
Bulsar	SC	Desai Gopalji Dahyabhai	Indian National Congress
Pardi	ST	Patel Uttam Harji	Praja Socialist Party

=== Maharashtra ===
Constituency	Reserved for (SC/ST/None)	Member	Party
Maharashtra State
Mumbai City-Mumbai Suburban District
Colaba	None	Dharia Kalaram Shankar	Indian National Congress
Mandvi	None	Salebhoy Abdul Kadar	Indian National Congress
Dongri	None	Hafizka Abdul Kadar Mohiuddin	Indian National Congress
Kumbharwada	None	Yagnik Bhanushankar Manchharam	Indian National Congress
Dhobi Talao	None	Narola Kailasnarayan Shivnarayan	Indian National Congress
Girgaum	None	Atre Prahlad Keshav	Independent
Walkeshwar	None	Silam Sayaji Laxman	Indian National Congress
Mahalaxmi	None	Taleyarkhan Homi Jrhangir	Indian National Congress
Byculla	SC	Boricha Paljibhai Hamabhai	Scheduled Castes Federation
Byculla	SC	Jagtap Bapurao Dhondiba	Communist Party of India
Nagpada	None	Safia Zubair	Indian National Congress
Mazgaon	None	Anande Deorao Laxman	Independent
Sewree	None	Patkar Savlaram	Communist Party of India
Parel	None	Shenoy Vyankatesh Appa	Praja Socialist Party
Matunga	SC	Mane Madhavrao Ganpatrao	Praja Socialist Party
Matunga	SC	Bhatankar Jagannath Ganpatrao	Scheduled Castes Federation
Worli	None	Bhandare Ramchandra Dhondiba	Scheduled Castes Federation
Dadar	None	Naravane Trimbakrao Ramchandra	Independent
Mahim	None	Pinto Frederick Michael	Praja Socialist Party
Parle Andheri	None	Shah Shantilal Harjivan	Indian National Congress
Bandra	None	Kher Purshottam Ganesh	Indian National Congress
Kurla	None	Magar Anjanabai Narhar	Indian National Congress
Chembur	None	Oza Indravadanrai Manmohanrai	Indian National Congress
Borivali	None	Parekh Ishwarlal Pranjivandas	Indian National Congress
Thane-Palghar District
Bassein	None	Warty Sadanand Gopal	Praja Socialist Party
Palghar	None	Shah Navnitrai Bhogilal	Praja Socialist Party
Dahanu	ST	Patil Shamrao Ramchandra	Indian National Congress
Dahanu	ST	Thakaria Santu Devoo	Indian National Congress
Jawhar	ST	Mukane Trimbak Bhau	Indian National Congress
Bhiwandi	ST	Ambekar Yashwant Gunaji	Peasants and Workers Party of India
Bhiwandi	ST	Patil Bhalchandra Shivaram	Peasants and Workers Party of India
Murbad	None	Thakare Shantaram Balkrishna	Peasants and Workers Party of India
Kalyan	None	Dhulup Krishnarao Narayan	Peasants and Workers Party of India
Ulhasnagar	None	Gurbani Nevandram Vishindas	Indian National Congress
Thane	None	Tamhane Dattatraya Balkrishna	Praja Socialist Party
Raigad District
Panvel	None	Patil Dinkar Balu	Peasants and Workers Party of India
Pen	ST	Katkari Govind Sonu	Peasants and Workers Party of India
Pen	ST	Raut Vasant Rajaram	Peasants and Workers Party of India
Alibag	None	Patil Dattatraya Narayan	Peasants and Workers Party of India
Roha	None	Sanap Pandurang Ramji	Peasants and Workers Party of India
Mangaon	SC	Tipnis Surendranath Govind	Praja Socialist Party
Mangaon	SC	Gaikwad Tanhaji Ganpat	Independent
Mahad	None	Purohit Digambar Vinayak	Praja Socialist Party
Pune District
Shukrawar Peth	None	Joshi Shridhar Mahadeo	Praja Socialist Party
Kasba Peth	None	Chitale Vishnu Dattatraya	Communist Party of India
Shivajinagar	None	Tilak Jayant Shridhar	Hindu Mahasabha
Poona Cantonment	None	Shivarkar Vithal Namdeo	Praja Socialist Party
Haveli	SC	Choure Purshottam Martandrao	Scheduled Castes Federation
Haveli	SC	Tupe Ram Dashrath	Praja Socialist Party
Indapur	None	Patil Shankarrao Bajirao	Indian National Congress
Baramati	SC	Jagtap Nanasaheb Bapuji	Peasants and Workers Party of India
Baramati	SC	Londhe Sambhaji Bandoba	Scheduled Castes Federation
Shirur	None	More Shamakant Damodar	Praja Socialist Party
Junnar	None	Kale Shivaji Mahadu	Praja Socialist Party
Ambegaon	None	Gholap Baburao Krishnaji	Independent
Khed	None	Vadgaonkar Tarachand Hirachand	Praja Socialist Party
Maval	None	Mhalgi Ramchandra Kashinath	Bharatiya Jana Sangh
Bhor	None	Mali Jayasing Parasharam	Independent
Purandar	None	Pawar Raghunathrao Anandrao	Peasants and Workers Party of India
Ratnagiri-Sindhudurga District
Khed	None	Patne Jagannath Shioram	Scheduled Castes Federation
Dapoli	None	Mandlik Purshottam Vasudeo	Praja Socialist Party
Guhagar	None	Vilankar Dattatraya Yeshawant	Bharatiya Jana Sangh
Chiplun	SC	Tambitkar Shankar Ganu	Communist Party of India
Chiplun	SC	Kambale Gangaram Bhikaji	Scheduled Castes Federation
Sangameshwar	None	Vichare Arjun Bapuji	Independent
Ratnagiri	None	Modak Atmaram Vasudeo	Praja Socialist Party
Lanja	None	Athale Shashishekhar Kashinath	Praja Socialist Party
Rajapur	None	Kulkarni Prabhat Mahadeo	Praja Socialist Party
Malvan	None	Manjarekar Shridhar Balkrishna	Bharatiya Jana Sangh
Deogad	None	Tawade Jagannath Ramkrishna	Peasants and Workers Party of India
Kankavli	None	Sawant Bhaskar Balkrishna	Peasants and Workers Party of India
Vengurla	None	Chamankar Narayan Mahadeo	Praja Socialist Party
Sawantwadi	None	Bhosale Shivram Sawantkhem Sawant	Independent
Kolhapur District
Chandgad	None	Patil Narsing Bhujang	Peasants and Workers Party of India
Gadhinglaj	None	Narwekr Dnyandeo Santram	Peasants and Workers Party of India
Kagal	None	Bagal Vimalabai Vasant	Independent
Bhudargad	None	Desai Kaka Gopal	Communist Party of India
Radhanagari	None	Khandekar Dnyandeo Santaram	Peasants and Workers Party of India
Panhala	None	Desai Babajirao Balasaheb	Independent
Shahuwadi	None	Karkhanis Tryambak Sitaram	Peasants and Workers Party of India
Kolhapur	None	Salokhe Pandurang Bapurao	Peasants and Workers Party of India
Hatkanangale	SC	Shirke Dadasaheb Malharrao	Scheduled Castes Federation
Hatkanangale	SC	Patil Santaram Sakharam	Independent
Shirol	None	Patil Satgonda Ravagonda	Independent
Sangli District
Jat	None	Dafale Vijaysinhrao Ramrao	Independent
Miraj	None	Patil Gundu Dasharath	Indian National Congress
Sangli	None	Patil Vasantrao Banduji	Indian National Congress
Tasgaon	None	Lad Ganpati Dada	Peasants and Workers Party of India
Vita	SC	More Bhagwan Nanasaheb	Peasants and Workers Party of India
Vita	SC	Madhale Pirajirao Tayapa	Scheduled Castes Federation
Walva	None	Nayakwadi Nagnath Ramachandra	Peasants and Workers Party of India
Shirala	None	Patil Yashavant Chandru	Peasants and Workers Party of India
Satara District
Karad North	None	Chavan Yashwantrao Balwantrao	Indian National Congress
Karad South	None	Mohite Yashwantrao Jijaba	Peasants and Workers Party of India
Patan	None	(satara)	Indian National Congress
Jaoli	None	Tarade Krishnarao Haribhau	Peasants and Workers Party of India
Wai	None	Jagtap Dadasaheb Khasherao	Peasants and Workers Party of India
Satara	None	Patil Vithal Nanasaheb	Independent
Koregaon	None	Mane Vishwasrao Vithalrao	Indian National Congress
Khatav	None	Patil Keshav Shankar	Praja Socialist Party
Phaltan	SC	Bandisode Sadashivrao Marutirao	Scheduled Castes Federation
Phaltan	SC	Nimbalkar Haribhau Vithalrao	Communist Party of India
Solapur District
Malshiras	None	Mohite Shankarrao Narayanrao	Independent
Pandharpur	None	Raul Raghunath Namdeo	Praja Socialist Party
Sangola	SC	Kambale Maruti Mahadeo	Indian National Congress
Sangola	SC	Raut Keshavrao Shripatrao	Indian National Congress
Akkalkot	None	Chandele Chhanusing Kalyansing	Indian National Congress
South Solapur	None	Basawanti Shantirappa Basappa	Indian National Congress
Solapur City North	None	Shah Keshavlal Veerchand	Indian National Congress
Solapur City South	None	Dhavale Rajaram Sawalaram	Indian National Congress
North Sholapur	None	Bhosale Nirmalaraje W/o Vijayasing	Indian National Congress
Barshi	None	Arya Shivaji Parshuram	Indian National Congress
Madha	SC	Sonawane Ganpat Laxman	Indian National Congress
Madha	SC	Jagatap Namdeo Mahadeo	Indian National Congress
Ahmednagar District
Shrigonda	SC	Pawar Ramchandra Devkaji	Independent
Shrigonda	SC	Satha Navshervan Navrozaji	Independent
Pathardi	None	Avhad Narayan Ganapat	Independent
Shegaon	None	Bhagwat Eknath Laxman	Independent
Ahmednagar North	None	Bhapkar Prabhakar Kondji	Independent
Ahmednagar South	None	Bharde Trimbak Shivram	Indian National Congress
Parner	None	Auti Bhaskar Tukaram	Independent
Rahuri	None	Patil Laxamanrao Madhavrao	Independent
Shirdi	SC	Pawar Arjun Giri	Independent
Shirdi	SC	Galande Bhaskarrao Sadashiv	Independent
Sangamner	ST	Deshmukh Datta Appaji	Independent
Sangamner	ST	Navali Narayan Ramji	Independent
Nashik District
Igatpuri	None	Govardhane Punjaji Laxman	Communist Party of India
Nashik	SC	Hande Vithalrao Ganpatrao	Peasants and Workers Party of India
Nashik	SC	Kamble S. L.	Scheduled Castes Federation
Dindori	ST	Bagul Ramdas Pandu	Communist Party of India
Dindori	ST	Daokhar Fakirrao Sakharam	Communist Party of India
Dangs	ST	Patel Naranbhai Lashabhai	Independent
Niphad	ST	Wagh Deoram Sayaji	Communist Party of India
Sinnar	None	Navale Shankar Kondaji	Praja Socialist Party
Yeola	None	Kanade Dagu Shankar	Praja Socialist Party
Nandgaon	None	Hiray Bhausahib Sakharam	Indian National Congress
Malegaon	None	Ansari Haroon Ahmed	Praja Socialist Party
Baglan	None	Sonawane Narayan Mansaram	Praja Socialist Party
Dhule-Nandurbar District
Sakri	ST	Padawi Rama Jirya	Independent
Sakri	ST	Bedase Shankerrao Chindhuji	Independent
Navapur	ST	Chaudhari Abramji Dongarsing	Independent
Talode	ST	Padvi Gorji Surji	Praja Socialist Party
Shahada	ST	Bhandari Chandrasing Dhanka	Indian National Congress
Shahada	ST	Dhobi Vyankat Tanaji	Indian National Congress
Sindkheda	None	Sonawane Shankar Gorakh	Praja Socialist Party
Dhulia South	None	Chaudhari Ramdas Bhagawan	Independent
Dhulia North	None	Raundale Chudaman Ananda	Indian National Congress
Jalgaon District
Amalner	ST	Patil Madhav Gotu	Indian National Congress
Amalner	ST	Tadavi Jalamkhan Sandebajkhan	Indian National Congress
Parola	None	Marwadi Shrinivas Chunilal	Bharatiya Jana Sangh
Chalisgaon	None	Sonawane Rajaram Bhila	Praja Socialist Party
Pachora	None	Vagh Onkar Narayan	Praja Socialist Party
Jamner	None	Garud Gajananrao Raghunathrao	Praja Socialist Party
Erandol	None	Birla Sitaram Hirachand	Indian National Congress
Jalgaon	None	Bhalerao Sadashiv Narayan	Communist Party of India
Bhusawal	None	Bhirud Dattatraya Senu	Indian National Congress
Yawal	None	Deshpande Ramabai Narayan	Indian National Congress
Raver	SC	Chaudhari Madhukar Dhannaji	Indian National Congress
Raver	SC	Wankhede Keshavrao Raghoo	Indian National Congress
Buldhana District
Chikhali	None	Pawar Namdeo Punjaji	Indian National Congress
Buldhana	None	Kotamkar Indirabai Ramrao	Indian National Congress
Malkapur	None	Shelki Bhiku Fakira	Indian National Congress
Jalamb	None	Vithal Sadashio	Indian National Congress
Khamgaon	None	Bhatia Govindadas Ratanlal	Indian National Congress
Mehkar	None	Kakal Tulsiram Rodu	Scheduled Castes Federation
Mehkar	None	Annasaheb Alias Shankarrao	Peasants and Workers Party of India
Akola-Washim District
Washim	SC	Salwe Rambhau Chinkaji	Indian National Congress
Washim	SC	Rajurkar Jaisingrao Dinkarrao	Indian National Congress
Mangrulpir	SC	Biyani Brijlal Nandlal	Indian National Congress
Murtizapur	SC	Palaspagar Dagadu Zangoji	Indian National Congress
Murtizapur	SC	Korpe Kusum W/o Wamanrao	Indian National Congress
Akole	None	Vairale Madhusudan Atmaram	Indian National Congress
Balapur	None	Kazi Syed Ghiyasuddin Kazi Syed Nasiruddin	Indian National Congress
Akot	None	Saqui Niyazi Mohammad Subhan	Indian National Congress
Amravati District
Daryapur	SC	Khandare Kisanrao Narayan	Indian National Congress
Daryapur	SC	Deshmukh Narayan Uttarmrao	Indian National Congress
Melghat	None	Gawande Kokilabai Jagannath	Indian National Congress
Amravati	None	Joshi Maltibai Wamanrao	Indian National Congress
Badnera	None	Deshmukh Purushottam Kashirao	Indian National Congress
Chandur	None	Chore Pundalik Balkrishna	Indian National Congress
Achalpur	None	Patil Madhaorao Bhagwantrao	Indian National Congress
Morshi	None	Salao Hirabai Anandrao	Indian National Congress
Nagpur District
Katol	None	Gedam Shankarrao Daulatrao	Indian National Congress
Kalmeshwar	None	Wankhede Sheshrao Krishnarao	Indian National Congress
Saoner	None	Pathan Mohammad Abdullakhan	Indian National Congress
Ramtek	None	Tidke Narendra Mahipati	Indian National Congress
Nagpur I	None	Agarwal Madan Gopal Jodharaj	Indian National Congress
Nagpur II	None	Gupta Dindayal Nandram	Indian National Congress
Nagpur	SC	Shambharkar Punjabrao Hukam	Scheduled Castes Federation
Nagpur	SC	Bardhan Ardhendubhushan	Independent
Umrer	None	(sc)samrath Sadashiorao Rajaramrao	Indian National Congress
Umrer	None	Chaudhari Anantram Dayal	Indian National Congress
Bhandara-Gondia District
Bhandara	SC	Dhote Dada Dajiba	Indian National Congress
Bhandara	SC	Bhambore Sitaram Jairam	Indian National Congress
Tumsar	None	Makade Aoo Malku	Indian National Congress
Tirora	None	Dixit Shaligram Ramratan	Indian National Congress
Gondiya	None	Patel Manoharbhai Babarbhai	Indian National Congress
Goregaon	None	Rahangdale Puranlal Dharmabhau	Praja Socialist Party
Amgaon	None	Ingle Shushilabai Keshaorao	Indian National Congress
Sakoli	None	Tirpude Nashikro Khantadu	Indian National Congress
Sakoli	None	Paulzagade Adku Sonu	Indian National Congress
Chandrapur-Gadchiroli District
Bhadrawati	SC	Mathankar Narayan Harbaji	Indian National Congress
Bramhapuri	None	Nagmoti Murharirao Krishnarao	Indian National Congress
Bramhapuri	None	Meshram Govind Bijaji	Indian National Congress
Armori	SC	Tadurwar Krishnaya Venkayya	Indian National Congress
Sironcha	ST	Weakey Narayansinh Sampatsinh	Praja Socialist Party
Sironcha	ST	Atram Vishweshwarrao Dharmrao	Independent
Saoli	None	Kannamwar Marotrao Sambshio	Indian National Congress
Rajura	None	Dhote Ramchandra Ganpati	Indian National Congress
Chanda	None	Wasekar Laxmanrao Krishnaji	Indian National Congress
Wardha District
Hinganghat	None	Zade Keshaorao Motiram	Indian National Congress
Wardha	SC	Sonavane Shankarrao Vithalrao	Indian National Congress
Wardha	SC	Thakre Mahadeo Tukaram	Indian National Congress
Arvi	None	Deshmukh Bapurao Marotrao	Indian National Congress
Yavatmal District
Wani	ST	Kirtimantrao Bhujangrao	Indian National Congress
Wani	ST	Shridharrao Jawade	Indian National Congress
Kelapur	None	Tryambak Dattatraya Deshmukh Parvekar	Indian National Congress
Yavatmal	None	Ramchandra Jagoba Kadu alias Babasaheb Gharfalkar	Indian National Congress
Darwha	None	Deoram Shirom Patil	Independent
Digras	None	Madhaorao Baburao Mahindre	Indian National Congress
Pusad	SC	Daulat Laxman Khadse	Indian National Congress
Pusad	SC	Vasantrao Naik	
Nanded District
Kinwat	None	Uttam Baliram	Indian National Congress
Hadgaon	None	Anjanbai Jaiwantrao	Indian National Congress
Nanded	None	Deshpande Vithalrao Devidasrao	Communist Party of India
Dharmabad	None	Chaudhan Shankarao Bhaurao	Indian National Congress
Biloli	None	Laxmanrao	Indian National Congress
Biloli	None	More Jaywant Dnyaneshwar	Indian National Congress
Khandhar	None	Dhondge Keshavrao	Peasants and Workers Party of India
Osmanabad-Latur District
Renapur	None	Chandhari Gungadherappa S/o Chanbusappa	Indian National Congress
Ahmedpur	SC	Pawar Vasant Gangaram	Indian National Congress
Ahmedpur	SC	Tulsiram Kamble	Indian National Congress
Nilanga	None	Salunke Shripatrao Gayanurao	Peasants and Workers Party of India
Latur	None	Keshavrao Sonwane	Indian National Congress
Ausa	None	Chauhan Devisingh Venkatsingh	Indian National Congress
Omerga	None	Vishwambhar Namdeo	Indian National Congress
Tuljapur	None	Sahebrao Dada	Indian National Congress
Osmanabad	None	Udhavrao Patil	Peasants and Workers Party of India
Kalam	SC	Revappa Krishna	Indian National Congress
Kalam	SC	Tarabai W/o Mansing	Indian National Congress
Beed District
Ashti	None	Vishwanath Dagdu Ji	Indian National Congress
Bhir	None	Shantabai W/o Ratanlal	Indian National Congress
Georai	None	Limbaji Mukataji	Indian National Congress
Manjlegaon	None	Sabderali S/o Sujatali	Indian National Congress
Kaij	SC	Gaikwad Govindrao Keroji	Indian National Congress
Kaij	SC	Ramlingswami Mahalingswami	Indian National Congress
Parbhani-Hingoli District
Gangakhed	SC	Sakharam S/o Gopalrao	Indian National Congress
Gangakhed	SC	Pagare Namdeo S/o Deoji	Indian National Congress
Parbhani	None	Annaji S/o Ramchandra	Peasants and Workers Party of India
Basmath	None	Vishwanathrao S/o Madhaorao	Indian National Congress
Hingoli	SC	Surajmal S/o Narayan	Indian National Congress
Hingoli	SC	Baburao S/o Kondji	Indian National Congress
Partur	None	Wamanrao S/o Anand Rao	Indian National Congress
Aurangabad-Jalna District
Jintur	None	Bhagwanrao S/o Daulatrao	Indian National Congress
Ambad	None	Jedhe Nana	Indian National Congress
Jalna	SC	Rustumji Bezonji	Indian National Congress
Jalna	SC	Dhondirai Ganpatrao	Indian National Congress
Bhokardan	None	Gade Bhagwant Rao	Indian National Congress
Aurangabad	None	Mir Mahmood Ali	Indian National Congress
Paithan	None	Jadhav Venkat Rao	Indian National Congress
Gangapur	None	Chandragupta Digamberdas	Communist Party of India
Vaijapur	None	Mahendranath Ramchandra	Praja Socialist Party
Kannad	None	Baburao Manikrao	Indian National Congress
Sillod	None	Nagorao	Indian National Congress

== See also ==
- 1957 elections in India
- Bombay State
- 1952 Bombay Legislative Assembly election
