= Bhudargad Assembly constituency =

Constituency of the Maharashtra legislative assembly in India

Bhudargad
- Former constituency for the Maharashtra Legislative Assembly

Constituency details
- Country: India
- Region: Western India
- State: Maharashtra
- Established: 1952
- Abolished: 1967
- Total electors: 63,578
- Reservation: None

Bhudargad Assembly constituency (formerly Bhudargad–Ajra Assembly constituency) was an assembly constituency in the Indian state of Maharashtra.

Following the 1955 Delimitation, no major boundary changes were made, and the Bhudargad–Ajra constituency was renamed as Bhudargad Assembly constituency. After the 1967 Delimitation, the constituency was abolished.

As part of the reorganisation, the Bhudargad area was merged into the Radhanagari Assembly constituency, while the Ajra Mahal region was divided between the Chandgad Assembly constituency and the Gadhinglaj Assembly constituency (Uttur e.d.).

== Members of the Legislative Assembly ==
Election	Member	Party
1952	Patil Vishwanath Tukaram	Indian National Congress
1957	Desai Kaka Gopal	Communist Party of India
1962	Anandrao Kondiba Desai	Indian National Congress

== Election results ==
=== Assembly Election 1962 ===
1962 Maharashtra Legislative Assembly election : Bhudargad
Party	Candidate	Votes	%	±%
INC	Anandrao Kondiba Desai	22,171	60.38%	▲51.80
CPI	Kaka Gopala Desai	10,146	27.63%	▼28.00
Independent	Nana Santaram Bhosale	4,402	11.99%	New
Margin of victory		12,025	32.75%	▼2.80
Turnout		39,754	62.53%	▲6.24
Total valid votes		36,719		
Registered electors		63,578		▲15.71
INC gain from CPI		Swing	▲4.75	

=== Assembly Election 1957 ===
1957 Bombay State Legislative Assembly election : Bhudargad
Party	Candidate	Votes	%	±%
CPI	Desai Kaka Gopal	17,205	55.63%	New
Independent	Khorate Shivaji Vithoji	6,210	20.08%	New
Independent	Jadhav Hindurao Shamrao	4,859	15.71%	New
INC	Shane Diwan Sharfuddin Gudansaheb	2,654	8.58%	▼24.50
Margin of victory		10,995	35.55%	▲29.24
Turnout		30,928	56.29%	▼0.93
Total valid votes		30,928		
Registered electors		54,948		▲0.40
CPI gain from INC		Swing	▲22.55	

=== Assembly Election 1952 ===
1952 Bombay State Legislative Assembly election : Bhudargad Ajra
Party	Candidate	Votes	%	±%
INC	Patil Vishwanath Tukaram	10,359	33.08%	New
PWPI	Desai Amrit Santaji	8,383	26.77%	New
Independent	Desai Kaka Gopal	5,184	16.55%	New
Independent	Varake Shankarrao Daji	3,757	12.00%	New
Socialist	Tendulkar Gopal Mahadeo	2,697	8.61%	New
Independent	Paranjape Rajaram Govind	938	3.00%	New
Margin of victory		1,976	6.31%	
Turnout		31,318	57.22%	
Total valid votes		31,318		
Registered electors		54,728		
INC win (new seat)				
