= Dongri Assembly constituency =

Constituency of the Maharashtra legislative assembly in India

Dongri
- Former constituency for the Maharashtra Legislative Assembly

Constituency details
- Country: India
- Region: Western India
- State: Maharashtra
- Established: 1955
- Abolished: 1964
- Total electors: 63,408
- Reservation: None

Dongri Assembly constituency was an assembly constituency in the India state of Maharashtra.

== Members of the Legislative Assembly ==
Election	Member	Party
1957	Hafizka Abdul Kadar Mohiuddin	Indian National Congress
1962	Mustafa Gulamnabi Faki	Indian National Congress

== Election results ==
=== Assembly Election 1962 ===
1962 Maharashtra Legislative Assembly election : Dongri
Party	Candidate	Votes	%	±%
INC	Mustafa Gulamnabi Faki	18,906	50.60%	▼41.26
Independent	Gulam Mahmud Haji Noor Mohamed Banatwalla	18,457	49.40%	New
Margin of victory		449	1.20%	▼82.52
Turnout		38,103	60.09%	▲1.49
Total valid votes		37,363		
Registered electors		63,408		▲23.01
INC hold		Swing	▼41.26	

=== Assembly Election 1957 ===
1957 Bombay State Legislative Assembly election : Dongri
Party	Candidate	Votes	%	±%
INC	Hafizka Abdul Kadar Mohiuddin	27,749	91.86%	New
Independent	Tilve Bapusaheb Narayan	2,458	8.14%	New
Margin of victory		25,291	83.73%	
Turnout		30,207	58.60%	
Total valid votes		30,207		
Registered electors		51,547		
INC win (new seat)				
