= Chanda Assembly constituency =

Constituency of the Maharashtra legislative assembly in India

Chanda
- Former constituency for the Maharashtra Legislative Assembly

Constituency details
- Country: India
- Region: Western India
- State: Maharashtra
- Established: 1952
- Abolished: 1978
- Total electors: 107,024

Chanda Assembly constituency was an assembly constituency in the India state of Maharashtra.

== Members of the Legislative Assembly ==
Election	Member	Party
1952	Wasekar Laxmanrao Krishnaji	Indian National Congress
1957	Wasekar Laxmanrao Krishnaji	Indian National Congress
1962	Ramchandrarao Rajeshwarrao Ptdukhe	Independent politician
1967	E. P. Salve	Indian National Congress
1972	E. P. Salve	Indian National Congress

== Election results ==
=== Assembly Election 1972 ===
1972 Maharashtra Legislative Assembly election : Chanda
Party	Candidate	Votes	%	±%
INC	Eknath Salwe	41,514	64.30%	▲14.71
Independent	M. Krushnaji Kotpalliwar	15,779	24.44%	New
RPI	Ram Dass Dinu	3,286	5.09%	▼13.95
Independent	Madhao Balaji Thakare	2,950	4.57%	New
Independent	Belekar Das Jashwantrao	605	0.94%	New
Independent	Balkri Shna Potdukhe	425	0.66%	New
Margin of victory		25,735	39.86%	▲15.31
Turnout		66,827	62.44%	▲1.87
Total valid votes		64,559		
Registered electors		107,024		▲26.00
INC hold		Swing	▲14.71	

=== Assembly Election 1967 ===
1967 Maharashtra Legislative Assembly election : Chanda
Party	Candidate	Votes	%	±%
INC	E. P. Salve	23,782	49.59%	▲18.45
Independent	S. S. Potdukhe	12,007	25.04%	New
RPI	R. T. Dumbere	9,133	19.04%	New
Independent	W. L. Kedai	3,034	6.33%	New
Margin of victory		11,775	24.55%	▲7.75
Turnout		51,449	60.57%	▼12.88
Total valid votes		47,956		
Registered electors		84,943		▲28.99
INC gain from Independent		Swing	▲1.65	

=== Assembly Election 1962 ===
1962 Maharashtra Legislative Assembly election : Chanda
Party	Candidate	Votes	%	±%
Independent	Ramchandrarao Rajeshwarrao Ptdukhe	21,708	47.94%	New
INC	Lanmanrao Krishnaji Wasekar	14,099	31.14%	▼18.14
RPI	Upasrao Watuji Ghagargunde	7,878	17.40%	New
ABJS	Sachihitanand Sambashio Mungantiwar	1,594	3.52%	New
Margin of victory		7,609	16.80%	▼6.87
Turnout		48,373	73.45%	▲5.02
Total valid votes		45,279		
Registered electors		65,854		▲19.83
Independent gain from INC		Swing	▼1.34	

=== Assembly Election 1957 ===
1957 Bombay State Legislative Assembly election : Chanda
Party	Candidate	Votes	%	±%
INC	Wasekar Laxmanrao Krishnaji	18,531	49.28%	▼12.39
SCF	Rangari Khemdeo Pralhad	9,632	25.61%	▼0.65
Independent	Kotpalliwar Manoharrao Krishnaji	9,440	25.10%	New
Margin of victory		8,899	23.67%	▼11.74
Turnout		37,603	68.43%	▲9.77
Total valid votes		37,603		
Registered electors		54,954		▼0.41
INC hold		Swing	▼12.39	

=== Assembly Election 1952 ===
1952 Hyderabad State Legislative Assembly election : Chanda
Party	Candidate	Votes	%	±%
INC	Wasekar Laxmanrao Krishnaji	19,960	61.67%	New
SCF	Laxman Narayan Khobragade	8,499	26.26%	New
KMPP	Mohanlal Bansidhar Bajaj	1,470	4.54%	New
Independent	Rajeshwar Sonbaji Hood	1,220	3.77%	New
Socialist	Kisan Venku Patel	1,219	3.77%	New
Margin of victory		11,461	35.41%	
Turnout		32,368	58.66%	
Total valid votes		32,368		
Registered electors		55,183		
INC win (new seat)				
