= Mandvi, Maharashtra Assembly constituency =

Constituency of the Maharashtra legislative assembly in India

Mandvi
- Former constituency for the Maharashtra Legislative Assembly

Constituency details
- Country: India
- Region: Western India
- State: Maharashtra
- Established: 1955
- Abolished: 1964
- Total electors: 73,764
- Reservation: None

Mandvi Assembly constituency was an assembly constituency in the India state of Maharashtra.

== Members of the Legislative Assembly ==
Election	Member	Party
1957	Abdul Kadar Salebhoy	Indian National Congress
1962	Abdul Kadar Salebhoy	Indian National Congress

== Election results ==
=== Assembly Election 1962 ===
1962 Maharashtra Legislative Assembly election : Mandvi
Party	Candidate	Votes	%	±%
INC	Abdul Kadar Salebhoy	19,101	49.61%	▼5.07
PSP	Manohar Gopinath Kotwal	8,718	22.64%	New
Independent	Hanashyam Hari Kale	5,629	14.62%	New
Socialist	Munawar Usman Khan	3,804	9.88%	New
ABJS	Pannalal Amritlal Shah	1,248	3.24%	New
Margin of victory		10,383	26.97%	▲4.47
Turnout		39,975	54.19%	▼5.12
Total valid votes		38,500		
Registered electors		73,764		▲18.48
INC hold		Swing	▼5.07	

=== Assembly Election 1957 ===
1957 Bombay State Legislative Assembly election : Mandvi
Party	Candidate	Votes	%	±%
INC	Abdul Kadar Salebhoy	20,193	54.69%	New
ABHM	Savarkar Shantaram Shivram	11,885	32.19%	New
Independent	Fernandes George Mathew John	4,848	13.13%	New
Margin of victory		8,308	22.50%	
Turnout		36,926	59.31%	
Total valid votes		36,926		
Registered electors		62,257		
INC win (new seat)				
