= Khandhar Assembly constituency =

Constituency of the Maharashtra legislative assembly in India

Khandhar
- Former constituency for the Maharashtra Legislative Assembly

Constituency details
- Country: India
- Region: Western India
- State: Maharashtra
- Established: 1955
- Abolished: 1961
- Total electors: 64,563

Khandhar Assembly constituency was an assembly constituency in the India state of Maharashtra.

== Members of the Legislative Assembly ==
Election	Member	Party
1957	Dhondge Keshavrao	Peasants and Workers Party of India

== Election results ==
=== Assembly Election 1957 ===
1957 Bombay State Legislative Assembly election : Khandhar
Party	Candidate	Votes	%	±%
PWPI	Dhondge Keshavrao	13,326	61.25%	New
INC	Anandrao Narsingrao	8,430	38.75%	New
Margin of victory		4,896	22.50%	
Turnout		21,756	33.70%	
Total valid votes		21,756		
Registered electors		64,563		
PWPI win (new seat)				
