= Bhiwandi Assembly constituency =

Constituency of the Maharashtra legislative assembly in India

Bhiwandi
- Former constituency for the Maharashtra Legislative Assembly

Constituency details
- Country: India
- Region: Western India
- State: Maharashtra
- Established: 1955
- Abolished: 2008
- Total electors: 4,81,177
- Reservation: ST

Bhiwandi Assembly constituency was an assembly constituency in the India state of Maharashtra.

== Members of the Legislative Assembly ==
Election	Member	Party
1957	Patil Bhalchandra Shivaram; Ambekar Yashwant Gunaji (St)	Peasants and Workers Party of India
1962	Bango Nana Bhoir	Indian National Congress
1967	Bhai Patil	Peasants and Workers Party of India
1972	Haris Ridwan Burhan Saheb	Indian National Congress
1978	Taware Parsharam Dhondu	Independent politician
1980	Momin Vaqar Ahmed Ghulam Mohmed	Indian National Congress
1985	Taware Parsharam Dhondu	Janata Party
1990	Taware Parsharam Dhondu	Janata Dal
1995	Khan Mohammed Ali	Samajwadi Party
1999	Abdul Rasheed Tahir Momin	Indian National Congress
2004	Yogesh Ramesh Patil	Shiv Sena

== Election results ==
=== Assembly Election 2004 ===
2004 Maharashtra Legislative Assembly election : Bhiwandi
Party	Candidate	Votes	%	±%
SS	Yogesh Ramesh Patil	118,561	45.19%	▲19.70
SP	Abu Asim Azmi	78,467	29.91%	▲18.89
INC	Ansari Shujauddin Nizam	27,290	10.40%	▼28.27
Independent	Abdul Rasheed Tahir Momin	24,424	9.31%	New
BSP	Mohammad Khalid (Guddu)	3,642	1.39%	▼0.12
Independent	Sanjay Patil	3,520	1.34%	New
Margin of victory		40,094	15.28%	▲2.11
Turnout		2,62,338	54.51%	▲15.49
Registered electors		4,81,177		▲9.61
SS gain from INC		Swing	▲6.53	

=== Assembly Election 1999 ===
1999 Maharashtra Legislative Assembly election : Bhiwandi
Party	Candidate	Votes	%	±%
INC	Abdul Rasheed Tahir Momin	66,257	38.67%	▲26.14
SS	Naik Madan (Buwa) Krushna	43,680	25.49%	▼4.37
SP	Khan Mohammed Ali	18,878	11.02%	▼25.14
Independent	Taware Kamlakar Kashinath	16,652	9.72%	New
Independent	Shetty Santosh Manjayya	6,348	3.70%	New
CPI	Kamble Vijay Namdeo	2,626	1.53%	New
BSP	Ansari Mohiuddin Bangali	2,589	1.51%	New
Margin of victory		22,577	13.18%	▲6.88
Turnout		1,71,348	36.83%	▼15.19
Registered electors		4,38,978		▲7.00
INC gain from SP		Swing	▲2.51	

=== Assembly Election 1995 ===
1995 Maharashtra Legislative Assembly election : Bhiwandi
Party	Candidate	Votes	%	±%
SP	Khan Mohammed Ali	80,444	36.16%	New
SS	Naik Madan Krishna	66,434	29.86%	▲5.09
JD	Taware Parsharam Dhondu	32,667	14.68%	▼23.82
INC	Taware Gurunath Janardan	27,877	12.53%	▼3.96
Independent	Bhoi Anant Govidrao	2,473	1.11%	New
Independent	Ansari Mukhtar Ahamad Abdul Sattar	2,074	0.93%	New
Independent	Khan Mukhtar Ahamad Mahamadali	1,369	0.62%	New
Margin of victory		14,010	6.30%	▼7.44
Turnout		2,22,467	52.98%	▲2.48
Registered electors		4,10,269		▲34.40
SP gain from JD		Swing	▼2.34	

=== Assembly Election 1990 ===
1990 Maharashtra Legislative Assembly election : Bhiwandi
Party	Candidate	Votes	%	±%
JD	Taware Parsharam Dhondu	60,818	38.50%	New
SS	Raghunath (Appa) Padyal	39,123	24.77%	New
INC	Aajami Abdul Salam M. Rafi	26,046	16.49%	▼6.52
Independent	Bubere Ridwan Anwar Rafiuddin	14,241	9.02%	New
Independent	Ansari Amjadraja Nurul Hasan	7,011	4.44%	New
Independent	Malsahe Vilas Vishnu	2,409	1.53%	New
AIML	Ansari Gulamnabi Jalil Ahamad	2,086	1.32%	New
Margin of victory		21,695	13.73%	▼5.73
Turnout		1,57,960	50.77%	▼4.16
Registered electors		3,05,259		▲59.04
JD gain from JP		Swing	▼3.98	

=== Assembly Election 1985 ===
1985 Maharashtra Legislative Assembly election : Bhiwandi
Party	Candidate	Votes	%	±%
JP	Taware Parsharam Dhondu	45,579	42.48%	▼0.53
INC	R. C. Patil	24,690	23.01%	New
Independent	Amajad Raza Nurool Hasan Ansari	23,431	21.84%	New
Independent	Ayyub Solapurkar	5,503	5.13%	New
Independent	Kondalekar Krishnakant Kashinath	3,808	3.55%	New
Margin of victory		20,889	19.47%	▲14.34
Turnout		1,07,299	54.68%	▲6.23
Registered electors		1,91,938		▲24.79
JP gain from INC(I)		Swing	▼5.66	

=== Assembly Election 1980 ===
1980 Maharashtra Legislative Assembly election : Bhiwandi
Party	Candidate	Votes	%	±%
INC(I)	Momin Vaqar Ahmed Ghulam Mohmed	36,782	48.14%	▲21.75
JP	Taware Parsharam Dhondu	32,865	43.01%	▲26.32
BJP	Taware Shantaram Maruti	4,912	6.43%	New
Margin of victory		3,917	5.13%	▲2.04
Turnout		76,407	48.48%	▼7.65
Registered electors		1,53,808		▲25.10
INC(I) gain from Independent		Swing		

=== Assembly Election 1978 ===
1978 Maharashtra Legislative Assembly election : Bhiwandi
Party	Candidate	Votes	%	±%
Independent	Taware Parsharam Dhondu	20,774	29.47%	New
INC(I)	Hegde Prabhakar Madhavrao	18,600	26.39%	New
INC	Harris Ridwan Burhan	11,847	16.81%	▼29.71
JP	Kazi Shoukat Ali Mohomed	11,769	16.70%	New
SS	Krishna Kant Kashinath Kondlekar	3,243	4.60%	▼0.81
PWPI	Bhai Patil	1,898	2.69%	▼12.68
Independent	Jangi Sundra Ram	498	0.71%	New
Margin of victory		2,174	3.08%	▼22.01
Turnout		70,484	55.94%	▼5.11
Registered electors		1,22,952		▲2.08
Independent gain from INC		Swing	▼17.05	

=== Assembly Election 1972 ===
1972 Maharashtra Legislative Assembly election : Bhiwandi
Party	Candidate	Votes	%	±%
INC	Haris Ridwan Burhan Saheb	34,983	46.52%	▲14.33
ABJS	Bhagwan P. Vyas	16,115	21.43%	▲16.96
PWPI	Bhalchandra Shivram Patil	11,558	15.37%	▼31.59
CPI(M)	Momim Abdul J. Sattar	5,549	7.38%	New
SS	Tamhane Dilip Yashwant	4,068	5.41%	New
Independent	Raghunath Laxman Jadhav	1,014	1.35%	New
Margin of victory		18,868	25.09%	▲10.32
Turnout		75,202	60.84%	▼2.11
Registered electors		1,20,450		▲27.05
INC gain from PWPI		Swing	▼0.44	

=== Assembly Election 1967 ===
1967 Maharashtra Legislative Assembly election : Bhiwandi
Party	Candidate	Votes	%	±%
PWPI	Bhai Patil	28,735	46.96%	▲6.40
INC	N. B. Patil	19,698	32.19%	▼9.59
PSP	Taware Parsharam Dhondu	5,971	9.76%	New
ABJS	D. P. Gaikwad	2,736	3.64%	New
Independent	A. K. Gaikwad	1,141	1.52%	New
Margin of victory		9,037	14.77%	▲13.54
Turnout		61,194	61.48%	▲9.87
Registered electors		94,803		▲4.01
PWPI gain from INC		Swing	▲5.17	

=== Assembly Election 1962 ===
1962 Maharashtra Legislative Assembly election : Bhiwandi
Party	Candidate	Votes	%	±%
INC	Bango Nana Bhoir	20,824	45.84%	▲24.36
PWPI	Bhalchandra Shivram Patil	20,212	44.49%	▲18.51
Independent	Yashwant Lahu Thorat	2,566	5.65%	New
Independent	Gopal Dhau Gaikawad	1,238	2.73%	New
Independent	Shantaram Dundya Patil	589	1.30%	New
Margin of victory		612	1.35%	▼3.16
Turnout		49,839	54.68%	▼47.90
Total valid votes		45,429		
Registered electors		91,148		▼27.07
INC gain from PWPI		Swing	▲19.85	

=== Assembly Election 1957 ===
1957 Bombay State Legislative Assembly election : Bhiwandi
Party	Candidate	Votes	%	±%
PWPI	Patil Bhalchandra Shivaram	31,742	25.98%	New
INC	Fakih Mustafa Gulamnabi	26,237	21.48%	New
PWPI	Ambekar Yashwant Gunaji (St)	26,118	21.38%	New
INC	Wagh Yashwant Govind (St)	22,634	18.53%	New
Independent	Bhere Krishna Ganapat	15,425	12.63%	New
Margin of victory		5,505	4.51%	
Turnout		122,156	97.74%	
Total valid votes		122,156		
Registered electors		124,980		
PWPI gain from INC		Swing		
