= Roha Assembly constituency =

Constituency of the Maharashtra legislative assembly in India

Roha
- Former constituency for the Maharashtra Legislative Assembly

Constituency details
- Country: India
- Region: Western India
- State: Maharashtra
- Established: 1955
- Abolished: 1964
- Total electors: 60,831
- Reservation: None

Roha Assembly constituency was an assembly constituency in the India state of Maharashtra.

== Members of the Legislative Assembly ==
Election	Member	Party
1957	Pandurang Ramaji Sanap	Peasants and Workers Party of India
1962	Pandurang Ramaji Sanap	Peasants and Workers Party of India

== Election results ==
=== Assembly Election 1962 ===
1962 Maharashtra Legislative Assembly election : Roha
Party	Candidate	Votes	%	±%
PWPI	Pandurang Ramaji Sanap	17,466	47.68%	▼19.53
INC	Yashwant Dwarkanath Deshmukh	15,606	42.60%	▲9.81
Independent	Keshav Ganpat Gaikwad	1,908	5.21%	New
ABJS	Dattatraya Bhikaji Gadre	1,651	4.51%	New
Margin of victory		1,860	5.08%	▲5.08
Turnout		39,596	65.09%	▲8.68
Total valid votes		36,631		
Registered electors		60,831		▲16.55
PWPI hold		Swing	▼19.53	

=== Assembly Election 1957 ===
1957 Bombay State Legislative Assembly election : Roha
Party	Candidate	Votes	%	±%
PWPI	Pandurang Ramaji Sanap	19,787	67.21%	New
PWPI	Sanap Pandurang Ramji	19,787	67.21%	New
INC	Dighe Bhaskar Narayan	9,654	32.79%	New
Turnout		29,441	56.41%	
Total valid votes		29,441		
Registered electors		52,193		
PWPI win (new seat)				
