= Lanja Assembly constituency =

Constituency of the Maharashtra legislative assembly in India

Lanja
- Former constituency for the Maharashtra Legislative Assembly

Constituency details
- Country: India
- Region: Western India
- State: Maharashtra
- Established: 1951
- Abolished: 1976
- Total electors: 67,646

Lanja Assembly constituency was an assembly constituency in the India state of Maharashtra. After 1976 Delimitation act, it was split into Rajapur and Sangameshwar.

== Members of the Legislative Assembly ==
| Election | Member | Party |
|---|---|---|
| 1952 | Kalambate Vithal Ganesh | Indian National Congress |
| 1957 | Shashishenkar Kashinath Athalye | Praja Socialist Party |
| 1962 | Shashishenkar Kashinath Athalye | Praja Socialist Party |
| 1967 | Shashishenkar Kashinath Athalye | Praja Socialist Party |
| 1972 | Shiwajirao Sawant | Indian National Congress |

== Election results ==
=== Assembly Election 1972 ===
1972 Maharashtra Legislative Assembly election : Lanja
| Party | Candidate | Votes | % | ±% |
|---|---|---|---|---|
| INC | Shiwajirao Sawant | 21,939 | 60.34% | ▲24.17 |
| SSP | Jagannathrao Jadhao | 11,308 | 31.10% | New |
| INC(O) | Vanjare Nana | 2,376 | 6.54% | New |
| Independent | Gopal Kashinath Surve | 734 | 2.02% | New |
| Margin of victory | | 10,631 | 29.24% | ▲17.53 |
| Turnout | | 38,513 | 56.93% | ▼2.12 |
| Total valid votes | | 36,357 | | |
| Registered electors | | 67,646 | | ▲5.63 |
| INC gain from PSP | | Swing | ▲12.46 | |

=== Assembly Election 1967 ===
1967 Maharashtra Legislative Assembly election : Lanja
| Party | Candidate | Votes | % | ±% |
|---|---|---|---|---|
| PSP | Shashishenkar Kashinath Athalye | 16,620 | 47.88% | ▼3.74 |
| INC | Shiwajirao Sawant | 12,556 | 36.17% | ▲12.76 |
| Independent | R. R. Kamble | 5,539 | 15.96% | New |
| Margin of victory | | 4,064 | 11.71% | ▼16.50 |
| Turnout | | 37,816 | 59.05% | ▲22.09 |
| Total valid votes | | 34,715 | | |
| Registered electors | | 64,039 | | ▲16.70 |
| PSP hold | | Swing | ▼3.74 | |

=== Assembly Election 1962 ===
1962 Maharashtra Legislative Assembly election : Lanja
| Party | Candidate | Votes | % | ±% |
|---|---|---|---|---|
| PSP | Shashishenkar Kashinath Athalye | 9,562 | 51.62% | ▼29.23 |
| INC | Anna Shripat Vishwasrao | 4,336 | 23.41% | ▲11.97 |
| PWPI | Narayan Babu Chaugule | 2,669 | 14.41% | New |
| ABJS | Purushottam Pandurang Chawan | 1,958 | 10.57% | New |
| Margin of victory | | 5,226 | 28.21% | ▼41.21 |
| Turnout | | 20,283 | 36.96% | ▼4.99 |
| Total valid votes | | 18,525 | | |
| Registered electors | | 54,876 | | ▲4.43 |
| PSP hold | | Swing | ▼29.23 | |

=== Assembly Election 1957 ===
1957 Bombay State Legislative Assembly election : Lanja
| Party | Candidate | Votes | % | ±% |
|---|---|---|---|---|
| PSP | Athale Shashishekhar Kashinath | 17,824 | 80.85% | New |
| INC | Kalambate Vithal Ganesh | 2,521 | 11.44% | ▼27.88 |
| Independent | Khanvilkar Appasaheb Balvantrao | 1,700 | 7.71% | New |
| Margin of victory | | 15,303 | 69.42% | ▲61.67 |
| Turnout | | 22,045 | 41.95% | ▲9.46 |
| Total valid votes | | 22,045 | | |
| Registered electors | | 52,547 | | ▼14.28 |
| PSP gain from INC | | Swing | ▲41.53 | |

=== Assembly Election 1952 ===
1952 Bombay State Legislative Assembly election : Lanja
| Party | Candidate | Votes | % | ±% |
|---|---|---|---|---|
| INC | Kalambate Vithal Ganesh | 7,831 | 39.32% | New |
| Socialist | Athiye Shashishekhar Kashinath | 6,288 | 31.58% | New |
| Independent | Thakurdesai Shivram Ganesh | 3,143 | 15.78% | New |
| PWPI | Salvi Vinayakrao Shivramrao | 2,652 | 13.32% | New |
| Margin of victory | | 1,543 | 7.75% | |
| Turnout | | 19,914 | 32.49% | |
| Total valid votes | | 19,914 | | |
| Registered electors | | 61,299 | | |
| INC win (new seat) | | | | |
