= Deogad Assembly constituency =

Constituency of the Maharashtra legislative assembly in India

Deogad
- Former constituency for the Maharashtra Legislative Assembly

Constituency details
- Country: India
- Region: Western India
- State: Maharashtra
- Established: 1952
- Abolished: 2008
- Total electors: 119,838

Deogad Assembly constituency was an assembly constituency in the India state of Maharashtra.

== Members of the Legislative Assembly ==
Election	Member	Party
1952	Wamanrao Nagoji Rane	Indian National Congress
1957	Tawade Jagannath Ramkrishna	Peasants and Workers Party of India
1962	Wamanrao Nagoji Rane	Indian National Congress
1967	R. B. Munj	Praja Socialist Party
1972	Mirashi Rajabhau Govind	Indian National Congress
1978	Vasant Sadashiv Satam	Janata Party
1980	Amrit Gangaram Rane	Indian National Congress
1985	Appa Gogate	Bharatiya Janata Party
1990	Appa Gogate	Bharatiya Janata Party
1995	Janardan Moreshwar Gogate	Bharatiya Janata Party
1999	Appa Gogate	Bharatiya Janata Party
2004	Ajit Pandurang Gogate	Bharatiya Janata Party

== Election results ==
=== Assembly Election 2004 ===
2004 Maharashtra Legislative Assembly election : Deogad
Party	Candidate	Votes	%	±%
BJP	Ajit Pandurang Gogate	42,384	48.28%	▲8.33
NCP	Kuldeep Pednekar	41,312	47.06%	New
Independent	Saravankar Sunil	1,824	2.08%	New
Independent	Prin. Mahendra Natekar	977	1.11%	New
BSP	Sudhakar Shantaram Mangaonkar	633	0.72%	New
Margin of victory		1,072	1.22%	▼15.26
Turnout		87,789	73.26%	▲15.43
Total valid votes		87,789		
Registered electors		119,838		▲7.38
BJP hold		Swing	▲8.33	

=== Assembly Election 1999 ===
1999 Maharashtra Legislative Assembly election : Deogad
Party	Candidate	Votes	%	±%
BJP	Appa Gogate	23,268	39.95%	▼16.12
Independent	Narayan Kashinath Uparkar	13,669	23.47%	New
INC	Balu Kubal	10,601	18.20%	▼16.90
Independent	Prabhakar Laxman Patil	7,604	13.06%	New
Independent	Vinayak Dhaku Mithbavkar	2,570	4.41%	New
Independent	Ganpat Narayan Patade	524	0.90%	New
Margin of victory		9,599	16.48%	▼4.49
Turnout		64,534	57.83%	▼23.82
Total valid votes		58,236		
Registered electors		111,600		▼2.57
BJP hold		Swing	▼16.12	

=== Assembly Election 1995 ===
1995 Maharashtra Legislative Assembly election : Deogad
Party	Candidate	Votes	%	±%
BJP	Janardan Moreshwar Gogate	51,352	56.07%	▲2.58
INC	Nandkumar Laxman Ghate	32,147	35.10%	▲1.06
JD	Kishor Rameshar Powar	5,281	5.77%	▼4.46
Doordarshi Party	Parab Vasant Sadashiv	1,139	1.24%	New
Independent	Sonu Govind Kokare	555	0.61%	New
Margin of victory		19,205	20.97%	▲1.53
Turnout		93,526	81.65%	▲11.99
Total valid votes		91,580		
Registered electors		114,549		▲1.88
BJP hold		Swing	▲2.58	

=== Assembly Election 1990 ===
1990 Maharashtra Legislative Assembly election : Deogad
Party	Candidate	Votes	%	±%
BJP	Appa Gogate	41,126	53.49%	▲14.94
INC	A. G. Alias Dada Rane	26,176	34.04%	▲8.65
JD	Kamaltai Balkrishna Parulekar	7,868	10.23%	New
Independent	Prakash Kashiram Rane	998	1.30%	New
Margin of victory		14,950	19.44%	▲6.28
Turnout		78,318	69.66%	▲7.40
Total valid votes		76,890		
Registered electors		112,431		▲23.56
BJP hold		Swing	▲14.94	

=== Assembly Election 1985 ===
1985 Maharashtra Legislative Assembly election : Deogad
Party	Candidate	Votes	%	±%
BJP	Appa Gogate	21,386	38.55%	▲7.55
INC	R. R. Loke	14,085	25.39%	New
Independent	Mirashi Rajabhau Govind	9,317	16.79%	New
Independent	Dada Alias Bhaskar Shankar Talekar	7,278	13.12%	New
Independent	Shankar Yashwant Ghadigaonkar	2,648	4.77%	New
Independent	Vinayak Dhaku Mithbavkar	762	1.37%	New
Margin of victory		7,301	13.16%	▲8.22
Turnout		56,649	62.26%	▲6.76
Total valid votes		55,476		
Registered electors		90,991		▲8.16
BJP gain from INC(I)		Swing	▲2.61	

=== Assembly Election 1980 ===
1980 Maharashtra Legislative Assembly election : Deogad
Party	Candidate	Votes	%	±%
INC(I)	Amrit Gangaram Rane	16,423	35.94%	▲33.80
BJP	Appa Gogate	14,165	31.00%	New
INC(U)	Mirashi Rajabhau Govind	12,014	26.29%	New
Independent	Kamatekar Sadashiv Krishnaji	3,096	6.77%	New
Margin of victory		2,258	4.94%	▼39.17
Turnout		46,692	55.50%	▼13.34
Total valid votes		45,698		
Registered electors		84,130		▼0.20
INC(I) gain from JP		Swing	▼34.52	

=== Assembly Election 1978 ===
1978 Maharashtra Legislative Assembly election : Deogad
Party	Candidate	Votes	%	±%
JP	Vasant Sadashiv Satam	39,499	70.46%	New
INC	Rajabhau Mirashi	14,774	26.36%	▼42.25
INC(I)	Girkar Prabhakar Ramchandra	1,199	2.14%	New
Independent	Vinayak Dhaku Mithbavkar	583	1.04%	New
Margin of victory		24,725	44.11%	▼8.49
Turnout		58,030	68.84%	▲5.37
Total valid votes		56,055		
Registered electors		84,301		▲31.57
JP gain from INC		Swing	▲1.85	

=== Assembly Election 1972 ===
1972 Maharashtra Legislative Assembly election : Deogad
Party	Candidate	Votes	%	±%
INC	Mirashi Rajabhau Govind	26,918	68.61%	▲41.65
ABJS	Vasant Sadashiv Satam	6,279	16.00%	▼7.92
SSP	Ramchandra Balkrishna Munja	5,412	13.79%	New
Independent	Tawade J. Ramkrishna	626	1.60%	New
Margin of victory		20,639	52.60%	▲37.79
Turnout		40,668	63.47%	▲1.67
Total valid votes		39,235		
Registered electors		64,072		▲2.84
INC gain from PSP		Swing	▲26.83	

=== Assembly Election 1967 ===
1967 Maharashtra Legislative Assembly election : Deogad
Party	Candidate	Votes	%	±%
PSP	R. B. Munj	14,561	41.78%	▲10.02
INC	R. G. Mirashi	9,398	26.96%	▼6.58
ABJS	V. S. Satam	8,339	23.92%	New
RPI	B. S. Tambe	1,978	5.67%	New
Independent	V. K. Dadam	579	1.66%	New
Margin of victory		5,163	14.81%	▲13.04
Turnout		38,500	61.80%	▲15.96
Total valid votes		34,855		
Registered electors		62,301		▲0.06
PSP gain from INC		Swing	▲8.24	

=== Assembly Election 1962 ===
1962 Maharashtra Legislative Assembly election : Deogad
Party	Candidate	Votes	%	±%
INC	Wamanrao Nagoji Rane	8,616	33.54%	▲7.77
PSP	Ramchandra Balkrishna Munja	8,161	31.76%	New
ABJS	Vasant Sadashiv Satam	4,626	18.01%	New
PWPI	Akaram Govind Kadam	2,975	11.58%	▼62.65
Independent	Sonu Punaji Jadhav	1,314	5.11%	New
Margin of victory		455	1.77%	▼46.70
Turnout		28,543	45.84%	▼2.11
Total valid votes		25,692		
Registered electors		62,265		▲6.84
INC gain from PWPI		Swing	▼40.69	

=== Assembly Election 1957 ===
1957 Bombay State Legislative Assembly election : Deogad
Party	Candidate	Votes	%	±%
PWPI	Tawade Jagannath Ramkrishna	20,742	74.23%	▲52.95
INC	Gawade Ankush Shankar	7,199	25.77%	▼14.84
Margin of victory		13,543	48.47%	▲45.97
Turnout		27,941	47.95%	▲11.98
Total valid votes		27,941		
Registered electors		58,277		▲18.33
PWPI gain from INC		Swing	▲33.62	

=== Assembly Election 1952 ===
1952 Bombay State Legislative Assembly election : Deogad
Party	Candidate	Votes	%	±%
INC	Rane Waman Nagoji	7,193	40.61%	New
Independent	Kode Dattatray Balkrishna	6,751	38.11%	New
PWPI	Jogal Dhakoji Mukund	3,769	21.28%	New
Margin of victory		442	2.50%	
Turnout		17,713	35.97%	
Total valid votes		17,713		
Registered electors		49,250		
INC win (new seat)				
