= Dhulia South Assembly constituency =

Constituency of the Maharashtra legislative assembly in India

Dhulia South
- Former constituency for the Maharashtra Legislative Assembly

Constituency details
- Country: India
- Region: Western India
- State: Maharashtra
- Established: 1955
- Abolished: 1976
- Total electors: 94,617
- Reservation: None

Dhulia South Assembly constituency was an assembly constituency in the India state of Maharashtra.

== Members of the Legislative Assembly ==
Election	Member	Party
1957	Chaudhari Ramdas Bhagawan	Independent politician
1962	Bhagwatiprasad Rambharos Pande	Indian National Congress
1967	Dr. Chaudhari	Communist Party of India
1972	Kamalabai Chhaganlal	Indian National Congress

== Election results ==
=== Assembly Election 1972 ===
1972 Maharashtra Legislative Assembly election : Dhulia South
Party	Candidate	Votes	%	±%
INC	Kamalabai Chhaganlal	25,919	46.83%	▲5.43
Independent	Chaudhari	18,959	34.25%	New
ABJS	Madanlal Jamnalal Mishra	5,749	10.39%	New
CPI	Namdeorao K. Gaikwad	1,565	2.83%	▼43.61
RPI	Tayade Balwant Pandurang	1,361	2.46%	New
INC(O)	Pande B. P. Rambharos	874	1.58%	New
Independent	Hiraman Dhudaku Raerkar	599	1.08%	New
Margin of victory		6,960	12.58%	▲7.54
Turnout		56,778	60.01%	▼5.56
Total valid votes		55,347		
Registered electors		94,617		▲18.78
INC gain from CPI		Swing	▲0.39	

=== Assembly Election 1967 ===
1967 Maharashtra Legislative Assembly election : Dhulia South
Party	Candidate	Votes	%	±%
CPI	Dr. Chaudhari	21,997	46.44%	New
INC	J. D. Raul	19,612	41.40%	▼6.92
Independent	Bhagwatiprasad Rambharos Pande	2,439	5.15%	New
PSP	B. B. Mali	1,941	4.10%	▼3.27
Independent	H. D. Nerkar	1,381	2.92%	New
Margin of victory		2,385	5.03%	▼11.71
Turnout		52,230	65.57%	▲4.61
Total valid votes		47,370		
Registered electors		79,655		▲10.28
CPI gain from INC		Swing	▼1.89	

=== Assembly Election 1962 ===
1962 Maharashtra Legislative Assembly election : Dhulia South
Party	Candidate	Votes	%	±%
INC	Bhagwatiprasad Rambharos Pande	21,278	48.33%	▲3.83
Independent	Ramdas Bhagwan Choudhary	13,903	31.58%	New
ABJS	Balkrishna Rameshwar Bhatwal	4,800	10.90%	New
PSP	Shankuntala Shankar Paranjape	3,244	7.37%	New
Independent	Momin A. Kadir A. Asagar	370	0.84%	New
Margin of victory		7,375	16.75%	▲5.73
Turnout		47,693	66.03%	▼2.00
Total valid votes		44,031		
Registered electors		72,227		▲17.43
INC gain from Independent		Swing	▼7.18	

=== Assembly Election 1957 ===
1957 Bombay State Legislative Assembly election : Dhulia South
Party	Candidate	Votes	%	±%
Independent	Chaudhari Ramdas Bhagawan	21,496	55.51%	New
INC	Mudholkar Saralabai Vasudeo	17,229	44.49%	New
Margin of victory		4,267	11.02%	
Turnout		38,725	62.96%	
Total valid votes		38,725		
Registered electors		61,505		
Independent win (new seat)				
