= Nagpur II Assembly constituency =

Constituency of the Maharashtra legislative assembly in India

Nagpur Ii
- Former constituency for the Maharashtra Legislative Assembly

Constituency details
- Country: India
- Region: Western India
- State: Maharashtra
- Established: 1951
- Abolished: 1964
- Total electors: 84,209
- Reservation: None

Nagpur II Assembly constituency was an assembly constituency in the India state of Maharashtra.

== Members of the Legislative Assembly ==
Election	Member	Party
1952	Dindayal Nandram Gupta	Indian National Congress
1957	Gupta Dindayal Nandram	Indian National Congress
1962	Dhondbaji Dashrath Hadav	Independent politician

== Election results ==
=== Assembly Election 1962 ===
1962 Maharashtra Legislative Assembly election : Nagpur II
Party	Candidate	Votes	%	±%
Independent	Dhondbaji Dashrath Hadav	33,176	53.95%	New
INC	Pratapsinhrao Laxmanrao Bhonsle	16,175	26.30%	▼24.45
ABJS	Ramjiwan Faluram Choudhary	9,787	15.91%	New
Independent	Vikram Narayan Sawarkar	2,361	3.84%	New
Margin of victory		17,001	27.64%	▲26.13
Turnout		63,731	75.68%	▲7.27
Total valid votes		61,499		
Registered electors		84,209		▲25.37
Independent gain from INC		Swing	▲3.20	

=== Assembly Election 1957 ===
1957 Bombay State Legislative Assembly election : Nagpur II
Party	Candidate	Votes	%	±%
INC	Gupta Dindayal Nandram	23,321	50.75%	▼9.35
Independent	Samarth Ramkrishna Paikuji	22,629	49.25%	New
Margin of victory		692	1.51%	▼32.82
Turnout		45,950	68.41%	▲5.50
Total valid votes		45,950		
Registered electors		67,169		▲47.86
INC hold		Swing	▼9.35	

=== Assembly Election 1952 ===
1952 Hyderabad State Legislative Assembly election : Nagpur II
Party	Candidate	Votes	%	±%
INC	Dindayal Nandram Gupta	17,175	60.10%	New
Forward Bloc (Marxist Group)	Ramchndra Sakharam Ruikar	7,364	25.77%	New
Socialist	Vithoba Gopal Badwaik	3,215	11.25%	New
SKP	Baburao Tatyaji Bhonsale	825	2.89%	New
Margin of victory		9,811	34.33%	
Turnout		28,579	62.91%	
Total valid votes		28,579		
Registered electors		45,426		
INC win (new seat)				
