= North Sholapur Assembly constituency =

Constituency of the Maharashtra legislative assembly in India

North Sholapur
- Former constituency for the Maharashtra Legislative Assembly

Constituency details
- Country: India
- Region: Western India
- State: Maharashtra
- Established: 1951
- Abolished: 2008
- Total electors: 384,527
- Reservation: None

North Sholapur Assembly constituency was an assembly constituency in the India state of Maharashtra.

== Members of the Legislative Assembly ==
Election	Member	Party
1952	Bhosale Raje Nirmala Vijaysinh	Indian National Congress
1957	Bhosale Raje Nirmala Vijaysinh	Indian National Congress
1962	Govind Bhaurao Burgute	Indian National Congress
1967	B. K. Mane	Independent politician
1972	Killedar Abasaheb Baburao	Indian National Congress
1978	Sushilkumar Sambhaji Shinde	Indian National Congress
1980	Sushilkumar Sambhaji Shinde	Indian National Congress
1985	Sushilkumar Sambhaji Shinde	Indian National Congress
1990	Sushilkumar Sambhaji Shinde	Indian National Congress
1995	Khandare Uttamprakash Baburao	Shiv Sena
1999	Khandare Uttamprakash Baburao	Shiv Sena
2004	Khandare Uttamprakash Baburao	Shiv Sena

== Election results ==
=== Assembly Election 2004 ===
2004 Maharashtra Legislative Assembly election : North Sholapur
Party	Candidate	Votes	%	±%
SS	Khandare Uttamprakash Baburao	78,252	46.81%	▲4.15
NCP	Laxman Bapurao Mane	55,986	33.49%	▲15.72
Independent	Bhadkumbe Sambhaji Chandrappa	12,452	7.45%	New
BSP	Anand Pralhad Shinde	11,317	6.77%	New
BBM	Bansode Pandharinath Raju	1,974	1.18%	▼23.02
Independent	Kshirsagar Shivaji Kondiba	1,877	1.12%	New
Independent	Milind Shripati Prakshale	1,475	0.88%	New
LJP	Prop. Dr. Ashok Baburao Gaikwad	1,337	0.80%	New
Margin of victory		22,266	13.32%	▼5.14
Turnout		167,225	43.49%	▼12.01
Total valid votes		167,153		
Registered electors		384,527		▲34.49
SS hold		Swing	▲4.15	

=== Assembly Election 1999 ===
1999 Maharashtra Legislative Assembly election : North Sholapur
Party	Candidate	Votes	%	±%
SS	Khandare Uttamprakash Baburao	63,274	42.66%	▼1.03
BBM	Bansode Pandharinath Raju	35,898	24.20%	New
NCP	Mane Laxman Bapurao	26,349	17.77%	New
Independent	Sarvade Raja Alias Sudhakar Tukaram	10,978	7.40%	New
Independent	Gaikwad Pramod Ramchandra	3,385	2.28%	New
Independent	Dhavare Dharmadeo Kondiba	2,852	1.92%	New
Independent	Kamble Babu Bhanudas	1,815	1.22%	New
Independent	Ganeshkar Nanda Eknath	1,595	1.08%	New
Margin of victory		27,376	18.46%	▲11.18
Turnout		158,675	55.50%	▼9.59
Total valid votes		148,316		
Registered electors		285,922		▲6.13
SS hold		Swing	▼1.03	

=== Assembly Election 1995 ===
1995 Maharashtra Legislative Assembly election : North Sholapur
Party	Candidate	Votes	%	±%
SS	Khandare Uttamprakash Baburao	74,951	43.69%	▲42.76
INC	Kamalapure Sundararaj Narasappa	62,455	36.40%	▼25.53
Independent	Gaikwad Pramod Ramachandra	11,701	6.82%	New
BSP	Bansode Bhagawantrao Ramachandra	7,407	4.32%	▲3.13
BBM	Gaikwad Ravindra Khajappa	4,772	2.78%	New
JD	Surve Chandrkant Sakharam	3,584	2.09%	▲1.12
Independent	Jogadankar Dhondiba Apparao	1,047	0.61%	New
Margin of victory		12,496	7.28%	▼24.16
Turnout		175,354	65.09%	▲3.79
Total valid votes		171,568		
Registered electors		269,397		▲30.49
SS gain from INC		Swing	▼18.24	

=== Assembly Election 1990 ===
1990 Maharashtra Legislative Assembly election : North Sholapur
Party	Candidate	Votes	%	±%
INC	Sushilkumar Sambhaji Shinde	77,309	61.93%	▼20.95
Independent	Chalawade Mallikarjun Shankar	38,067	30.49%	New
BSP	Rahul Vithalrao Sarwade	1,490	1.19%	New
JD	Gaikwad Ashok Baburao	1,217	0.97%	New
Independent	Bhagwan Ginyani Ughade	1,201	0.96%	New
SS	Sayajirao Salunke	1,161	0.93%	New
Independent	Londhe Hanumantu Khandhu	820	0.66%	New
Margin of victory		39,242	31.44%	▼34.32
Turnout		126,545	61.30%	▲3.32
Total valid votes		124,835		
Registered electors		206,451		▲53.68
INC hold		Swing	▼20.95	

=== Assembly Election 1985 ===
1985 Maharashtra Legislative Assembly election : North Sholapur
Party	Candidate	Votes	%	±%
INC	Sushilkumar Sambhaji Shinde	63,475	82.88%	New
Independent	Shinde Mallapppa Hanmantu	13,113	17.12%	New
Margin of victory		50,362	65.76%	▲53.84
Turnout		77,884	57.98%	▲0.32
Total valid votes		76,588		
Registered electors		134,335		▲28.10
INC gain from INC(I)		Swing	▲28.10	

=== Assembly Election 1980 ===
1980 Maharashtra Legislative Assembly election : North Sholapur
Party	Candidate	Votes	%	±%
INC(I)	Sushilkumar Sambhaji Shinde	32,511	54.78%	▲28.93
INC(U)	Ranshrungare Ramchandra Sakharam	25,436	42.86%	New
Independent	Tulse Pundlik Lakula	586	0.99%	New
Margin of victory		7,075	11.92%	▼7.82
Turnout		60,472	57.66%	▼4.50
Total valid votes		59,348		
Registered electors		104,868		▲11.48
INC(I) gain from INC		Swing	▲9.19	

=== Assembly Election 1978 ===
1978 Maharashtra Legislative Assembly election : North Sholapur
Party	Candidate	Votes	%	±%
INC	Sushilkumar Sambhaji Shinde	25,795	45.59%	▼9.31
INC(I)	Ranshrungare Ramchandra Sakharam	14,624	25.85%	New
Independent	Sonkamble Sidram Gundi	14,180	25.06%	New
Independent	Shinde Ambadas Saidu	1,981	3.50%	New
Margin of victory		11,171	19.74%	▲4.23
Turnout		58,480	62.16%	▼6.02
Total valid votes		56,580		
Registered electors		94,073		▲13.87
INC hold		Swing	▼9.31	

=== Assembly Election 1972 ===
1972 Maharashtra Legislative Assembly election : North Sholapur
Party	Candidate	Votes	%	±%
INC	Killedar Abasaheb Baburao	29,978	54.90%	▲11.57
Independent	Mane Brahmadeo Krishnat	21,509	39.39%	New
Independent	Babare Viththal Govind	2,659	4.87%	New
RPI	Sarwade Bhimrao Sidram	456	0.84%	▼10.25
Margin of victory		8,469	15.51%	▲13.26
Turnout		56,326	68.18%	▲2.42
Total valid votes		54,602		
Registered electors		82,616		▲18.06
INC gain from Independent		Swing	▲9.32	

=== Assembly Election 1967 ===
1967 Maharashtra Legislative Assembly election : North Sholapur
Party	Candidate	Votes	%	±%
Independent	B. K. Mane	19,772	45.58%	New
INC	R. S. Shah	18,796	43.33%	▼1.98
RPI	L. N. Abute	4,810	11.09%	New
Margin of victory		976	2.25%	▼11.14
Turnout		46,019	65.76%	▲3.40
Total valid votes		43,378		
Registered electors		69,976		▲9.07
Independent gain from INC		Swing	▲0.27	

=== Assembly Election 1962 ===
1962 Maharashtra Legislative Assembly election : North Sholapur
Party	Candidate	Votes	%	±%
INC	Govind Bhaurao Burgute	16,987	45.31%	▼4.23
PWPI	Vishwasrao Kondiba Phate	11,965	31.91%	▼7.44
Independent	Dhanyakumar Abaji Bhumkar	7,547	20.13%	New
Independent	Bali Buwaji Kadam	995	2.65%	New
Margin of victory		5,022	13.39%	▲3.20
Turnout		40,006	62.36%	▲16.39
Total valid votes		37,494		
Registered electors		64,156		▲1.99
INC hold		Swing	▼4.23	

=== Assembly Election 1957 ===
1957 Bombay State Legislative Assembly election : North Sholapur
Party	Candidate	Votes	%	±%
INC	Bhosale Raje Nirmala Vijaysinh	14,325	49.54%	▲5.07
PWPI	Fate Vishwas Kondiba	11,378	39.35%	▲10.50
Independent	Karande Babasaheb Damodhar	3,215	11.12%	New
Margin of victory		2,947	10.19%	▼5.43
Turnout		28,918	45.97%	▼3.91
Total valid votes		28,918		
Registered electors		62,905		▲4.00
INC hold		Swing	▲5.07	

=== Assembly Election 1952 ===
1952 Bombay State Legislative Assembly election : North Sholapur
Party	Candidate	Votes	%	±%
INC	Bhosale Raje Nirmala Vijaysinh	13,419	44.47%	New
PWPI	Jadhav Ambaddas Krishna	8,706	28.85%	New
SCF	Jadhav Sayabu Laxman	5,104	16.92%	New
Independent	Patil Vishnu Ramrao	2,944	9.76%	New
Margin of victory		4,713	15.62%	
Turnout		30,173	49.88%	
Total valid votes		30,173		
Registered electors		60,487		
INC win (new seat)				
