= Vita Assembly constituency =

Constituency of the Maharashtra legislative assembly in India

Vita
- Former constituency for the Maharashtra Legislative Assembly

Constituency details
- Country: India
- Region: Western India
- State: Maharashtra
- Established: 1955
- Abolished: 1964
- Total electors: 69,022

Vita Assembly constituency was an assembly constituency in the India state of Maharashtra.

== Members of the Legislative Assembly ==
Election	Member	Party
1957	More Bragwan Nanasaheb	Peasants and Workers Party of India
1957	Madhale Pirajirao Tayapa (Sc)	Scheduled Castes Federation
1962	Bhagwanrao Lalasaheb Pawar	Indian National Congress

== Election results ==
=== Assembly Election 1962 ===
1962 Maharashtra Legislative Assembly election : Vita
Party	Candidate	Votes	%	±%
INC	Bhagwanrao Lalasaheb Pawar	29,528	65.39%	▲47.66
RPI	Piraji Tayappa Madhale	10,927	24.20%	New
Independent	Rajaram Pandurang Badekar	1,392	3.08%	New
ABJS	Santram Gangaram Khade	929	2.06%	New
Margin of victory		18,601	41.19%	▲40.80
Turnout		45,154	62.29%	▼51.63
Registered electors		69,022		▼40.79
INC gain from PWPI		Swing	▲32.78	

=== Assembly Election 1957 ===
1957 Bombay State Legislative Assembly election : Vita
Party	Candidate	Votes	%	±%
PWPI	More Bragwan Nanasaheb	44,493	32.61%	New
SCF	Madhale Pirajirao Tayapa (Sc)	43,953	32.21%	New
INC	Deshmukh Vithalrao Bhausaheb	24,197	17.73%	New
INC	Satpvte Miraji Daii (Sc)	23,798	17.44%	New
Margin of victory		540	0.40%	
Turnout		136,441	117.05%	
Registered electors		116,571		
PWPI win (new seat)				
