= Dhulia North Assembly constituency =

Constituency of the Maharashtra legislative assembly in India

Dhulia North
- Former constituency for the Maharashtra Legislative Assembly

Constituency details
- Country: India
- Region: Western India
- State: Maharashtra
- Established: 1955
- Abolished: 1972
- Total electors: 96,999
- Reservation: None

Dhulia North Assembly constituency was an assembly constituency in the India state of Maharashtra.

== Members of the Legislative Assembly ==
Election	Member	Party
1957	Raundale Chudaman Ananda	Indian National Congress
1962	Chandrakant Nandeo Patil	Indian National Congress
1967	Chandrakant Nandeo Patil	Indian National Congress
1972	Sadashiv Shankar Mali	Indian National Congress

== Election results ==
=== Assembly Election 1972 ===
1972 Maharashtra Legislative Assembly election : Dhulia North
Party	Candidate	Votes	%	±%
INC	Sadashiv Shankar Mali	33,898	67.84%	▲6.67
PWPI	Zulal Bhilajirao Patil	15,623	31.26%	New
Independent	Madhavrao M. Sonawane	449	0.90%	New
Margin of victory		18,275	36.57%	▲9.15
Turnout		51,840	53.44%	▲3.72
Total valid votes		49,970		
Registered electors		96,999		▲9.10
INC hold		Swing	▲6.67	

=== Assembly Election 1967 ===
1967 Maharashtra Legislative Assembly election : Dhulia North
Party	Candidate	Votes	%	±%
INC	Chandrakant Nandeo Patil	25,993	61.17%	▼1.52
SSP	D. P. Patil	14,342	33.75%	New
Independent	D. T. Thakare	1,614	3.80%	New
Independent	V. T. Patil	546	1.28%	New
Margin of victory		11,651	27.42%	▼16.42
Turnout		47,768	53.73%	▼1.61
Total valid votes		42,495		
Registered electors		88,909		▲8.50
INC hold		Swing	▼1.52	

=== Assembly Election 1962 ===
1962 Maharashtra Legislative Assembly election : Dhulia North
Party	Candidate	Votes	%	±%
INC	Chandrakant Nandeo Patil	25,381	62.69%	▲4.12
PWPI	Zulal Bhilajirao Patil	7,634	18.86%	New
Independent	Dattu Waman Bhadane	3,843	9.49%	New
PSP	Bajrao Baliram Mali	3,629	8.96%	New
Margin of victory		17,747	43.83%	▲26.70
Turnout		44,138	53.86%	▼3.52
Total valid votes		40,487		
Registered electors		81,945		▲30.12
INC hold		Swing	▲4.12	

=== Assembly Election 1957 ===
1957 Bombay State Legislative Assembly election : Dhulia North
Party	Candidate	Votes	%	±%
INC	Raundale Chudaman Ananda	19,520	58.57%	New
SCF	Lalingkar Punaji Lingaji	13,810	41.43%	New
Margin of victory		5,710	17.13%	
Turnout		33,330	52.92%	
Total valid votes		33,330		
Registered electors		62,976		
INC hold		Swing		
