= Parola Assembly constituency =

Constituency of the Maharashtra legislative assembly in India

Parola
- Former constituency for the Maharashtra Legislative Assembly

Constituency details
- Country: India
- Region: Western India
- State: Maharashtra
- Established: 1951
- Abolished: 2008
- Total electors: 225,602
- Reservation: None

Parola Assembly constituency was an assembly constituency in the India state of Maharashtra.

== Members of the Legislative Assembly ==
Election	Member	Party
1952	Deshmukh Bhagwantrao Damodar	Indian National Congress
1957	Marwadi Shrinivas Chunilal	Bharatiya Jana Sangh
1962	Gulabrao Narayanrao Pawar	Indian National Congress
1967	Gulabrao Narayanrao Pawar	Indian National Congress
1972	Patil Bhaskarrao Rajaram	Indian National Congress
1978	Uttamrao Patil	Janata Party
1980	Patil Bhaskarrao Rajaram	Independent politician
1985	Vasantrao Jivanrao More	Indian Congress
1990	Vasantrao Jivanrao More	Indian National Congress
1995	Patil Bhaskarrao Rajaram	Independent politician
1996 By-election	Dr. Satish Bhaskarrao Patil	Indian National Congress
1999	Patil Chimanrao Rupchand	Shiv Sena
2004	Dr. Satish Bhaskarrao Patil	Nationalist Congress Party

== Election results ==
=== Assembly Election 2004 ===
2004 Maharashtra Legislative Assembly election : Parola
Party	Candidate	Votes	%	±%
NCP	Dr. Satish Bhaskarrao Patil	65,346	41.88%	▲6.59
SS	Patil Chimanrao Rupchand	65,199	41.78%	▲2.27
Independent	Pradeep Gulabrao Pawar	15,024	9.63%	New
Independent	Malche Rajesh Sukram	3,700	2.37%	New
Independent	Salve Sumanbai Rajaram	3,322	2.13%	New
BSP	More Surendra Chandra	1,713	1.10%	New
Margin of victory		147	0.09%	▼4.13
Turnout		156,108	69.20%	▲4.46
Total valid votes		156,050		
Registered electors		225,602		▲14.08
NCP gain from SS		Swing	▲2.37	

=== Assembly Election 1999 ===
1999 Maharashtra Legislative Assembly election : Parola
Party	Candidate	Votes	%	±%
SS	Patil Chimanrao Rupchand	47,041	39.51%	▲5.67
NCP	Dr. Satish Bhaskarrao Patil	42,013	35.29%	New
INC	Pawar Pradiprao Gulabrao	24,699	20.75%	▼38.20
Independent	Dr. Patil Sanjiv Krishnarao	4,434	3.72%	New
Independent	Thakare Babulal Rama	863	0.72%	New
Margin of victory		5,028	4.22%	▼20.89
Turnout		128,039	64.74%	▲5.37
Total valid votes		119,050		
Registered electors		197,764		▲6.36
SS gain from INC		Swing	▼19.44	

=== Assembly By-election 1996 ===
1996 Maharashtra Legislative Assembly by-election : Parola
Party	Candidate	Votes	%	±%
INC	Dr. Satish Bhaskarrao Patil	59,931	58.95%	▲42.56
SS	Patil Chimanrao Rupchand	34,406	33.84%	▲25.44
Independent	Patil Shantaram Bhila	3,014	2.96%	New
Independent	Mahajan Sanjay Bhimrao	2,411	2.37%	New
RPI	Nikam Mohan Girdhar	1,053	1.04%	New
Margin of victory		25,525	25.11%	▲2.41
Turnout		110,394	59.37%	▼13.62
Total valid votes		101,658		
Registered electors		185,931		▼3.04
INC gain from Independent		Swing	▲19.09	

=== Assembly Election 1995 ===
1995 Maharashtra Legislative Assembly election : Parola
Party	Candidate	Votes	%	±%
Independent	Patil Bhaskarrao Rajaram	54,095	39.86%	New
Independent	Vasantrao Jivanrao More	23,291	17.16%	New
INC	Pawar Pradeeprao Gulabrao	22,247	16.39%	▼15.28
Maharashtra Vikas Congres	Jain Mansuklal Motilal	12,310	9.07%	New
SS	Patil Ajabrao Mahadu	11,396	8.40%	▼6.94
BBM	Naik Mehtapsing Ramsing	5,600	4.13%	New
Independent	Patil Ashok Hari	3,007	2.22%	New
Independent	Dr. Netkar Santosh Bhikari	1,448	1.07%	New
Margin of victory		30,804	22.70%	▲20.01
Turnout		139,957	72.99%	▲14.14
Total valid votes		135,701		
Registered electors		191,756		▲10.83
Independent gain from INC		Swing	▲8.19	

=== Assembly Election 1990 ===
1990 Maharashtra Legislative Assembly election : Parola
Party	Candidate	Votes	%	±%
INC	Vasantrao Jivanrao More	31,511	31.67%	▼3.65
Independent	Patil Bhaskarrao Rajaram	28,830	28.97%	New
JD	Patil Bharat Ramshingh	18,775	18.87%	New
SS	Anandrao Sadashiv Pawar	15,267	15.34%	New
Independent	Bhagwan Panditrao Patil	3,047	3.06%	New
Independent	Mali Shivram Kashiram	622	0.63%	New
Margin of victory		2,681	2.69%	▼21.91
Turnout		101,820	58.85%	▼2.38
Total valid votes		99,507		
Registered electors		173,025		▲22.34
INC gain from IC(S)		Swing	▼28.25	

=== Assembly Election 1985 ===
1985 Maharashtra Legislative Assembly election : Parola
Party	Candidate	Votes	%	±%
IC(S)	Vasantrao Jivanrao More	50,640	59.92%	New
INC	Patil Bhaskarrao Rajaram	29,853	35.32%	New
Independent	Devendrakumar Dudhasing Nayak	1,685	1.99%	New
Independent	Kedar Vasant Valha	1,269	1.50%	New
Margin of victory		20,787	24.60%	▲12.37
Turnout		86,601	61.23%	▲11.07
Total valid votes		84,512		
Registered electors		141,430		▲9.51
IC(S) gain from Independent		Swing	▲19.71	

=== Assembly Election 1980 ===
1980 Maharashtra Legislative Assembly election : Parola
Party	Candidate	Votes	%	±%
Independent	Patil Bhaskarrao Rajaram	25,326	40.21%	New
JP	Vasantrao Jivanrao More	17,623	27.98%	New
INC(I)	K. D. Patil	12,996	20.63%	▲7.94
BJP	Patil Murlidhar Rajaram	6,044	9.60%	New
Independent	Patil Nawal Yadav	405	0.64%	New
Margin of victory		7,703	12.23%	▼7.77
Turnout		64,782	50.16%	▼17.77
Total valid votes		62,984		
Registered electors		129,152		▲8.72
Independent gain from JP		Swing	▼12.93	

=== Assembly Election 1978 ===
1978 Maharashtra Legislative Assembly election : Parola
Party	Candidate	Votes	%	±%
JP	Uttamrao Patil	40,965	53.14%	New
INC	Patil Bhaskarrao Rajaram	25,548	33.14%	▼55.65
INC(I)	Patil Shantaram Bhila	9,785	12.69%	New
Independent	Khairnar Sadashiv Daulat	792	1.03%	New
Margin of victory		15,417	20.00%	▼57.59
Turnout		80,690	67.93%	▲21.69
Total valid votes		77,090		
Registered electors		118,788		▲22.56
JP gain from INC		Swing	▼35.65	

=== Assembly Election 1972 ===
1972 Maharashtra Legislative Assembly election : Parola
Party	Candidate	Votes	%	±%
INC	Patil Bhaskarrao Rajaram	38,127	88.79%	▲41.97
ABJS	Suryawanshi C. Chindha	4,812	11.21%	▼18.13
Margin of victory		33,315	77.59%	▲60.11
Turnout		44,815	46.24%	▼8.64
Total valid votes		42,939		
Registered electors		96,923		▲8.78
INC hold		Swing	▲41.97	

=== Assembly Election 1967 ===
1967 Maharashtra Legislative Assembly election : Parola
Party	Candidate	Votes	%	±%
INC	Gulabrao Narayanrao Pawar	20,569	46.82%	▼4.59
ABJS	Shrinivas Chunilal Agarwal	12,889	29.34%	New
SSP	R. B. Sowane	7,199	16.39%	New
PSP	T. K. More	3,273	7.45%	▼12.06
Margin of victory		7,680	17.48%	▼11.19
Turnout		48,897	54.88%	▼5.81
Total valid votes		43,930		
Registered electors		89,099		▲11.37
INC hold		Swing	▼4.59	

=== Assembly Election 1962 ===
1962 Maharashtra Legislative Assembly election : Parola
Party	Candidate	Votes	%	±%
INC	Gulabrao Narayanrao Pawar	22,750	51.41%	▲9.84
ABJS	Shrinivas Chunilal Agarwal	10,065	22.74%	New
PSP	Dharma Gajmal Patil	8,635	19.51%	New
RPI	Namdeo Shivram Nhanavekar	2,802	6.33%	New
Margin of victory		12,685	28.67%	▲11.80
Turnout		48,555	60.69%	▲5.35
Total valid votes		44,252		
Registered electors		80,006		▲16.38
INC gain from ABJS		Swing	▼7.02	

=== Assembly Election 1957 ===
1957 Bombay State Legislative Assembly election : Parola
Party	Candidate	Votes	%	±%
ABJS	Marwadi Shrinivas Chunilal	22,233	58.43%	New
INC	Patil Abhiman Arjun	15,815	41.57%	▼27.84
Margin of victory		6,418	16.87%	▼34.43
Turnout		38,048	55.34%	▼2.51
Total valid votes		38,048		
Registered electors		68,748		▲39.31
ABJS gain from INC		Swing	▼10.98	

=== Assembly Election 1952 ===
1952 Bombay State Legislative Assembly election : Parola
Party	Candidate	Votes	%	±%
INC	Deshmukh Bhagwantrao Damodar	19,814	69.41%	New
Socialist	Pawar, Balawantrao Manikrao	5,169	18.11%	New
Independent	Bichave, Khandu Devchandra	3,565	12.49%	New
Margin of victory		14,645	51.30%	
Turnout		28,548	57.85%	
Total valid votes		28,548		
Registered electors		49,350		
INC win (new seat)				
