= Nagpur I Assembly constituency =

Constituency of the Maharashtra legislative assembly in India

Nagpur I
- Former constituency for the Maharashtra Legislative Assembly

Constituency details
- Country: India
- Region: Western India
- State: Maharashtra
- Established: 1951
- Abolished: 1964
- Total electors: 94,575
- Reservation: None

Nagpur I Assembly constituency was an assembly constituency in the India state of Maharashtra.

== Members of the Legislative Assembly ==
Election	Member	Party
1952	Madangopal Jodharaj Agarwal	Indian National Congress
1957	Agarwal Madan Gopal Jodharaj	Indian National Congress
1962	Vinayak Sakharam Dandekar	Independent politician

== Election results ==
=== Assembly Election 1962 ===
1962 Maharashtra Legislative Assembly election : Nagpur I
Party	Candidate	Votes	%	±%
Independent	Vinayak Sakharam Dandekar	30,643	46.38%	New
INC	Maangopal Jodharaj Agarwal	15,191	22.99%	▼22.14
PSP	Vasant Purushottam Sathe	12,294	18.61%	▼9.68
ABJS	Shankarrao Sakharamji Supare	3,957	5.99%	New
Independent	M. Zahiruddin M. Hafizuddin	3,091	4.68%	New
Independent	Namdeorao Kamalakar	612	0.93%	New
Margin of victory		15,452	23.39%	▲6.55
Turnout		69,064	73.03%	▲5.81
Total valid votes		66,069		
Registered electors		94,575		▲30.07
Independent gain from INC		Swing	▲1.25	

=== Assembly Election 1957 ===
1957 Bombay State Legislative Assembly election : Nagpur I
Party	Candidate	Votes	%	±%
INC	Agarwal Madan Gopal Jodharaj	22,057	45.13%	▼2.21
PSP	Sathe Vasantrao Purushottam	13,826	28.29%	New
Independent	Mahendre Narendra Bhayaji	9,452	19.34%	New
ABHM	Khare Narayan Bhaskar	1,356	2.77%	New
Independent	Vyas Pannalal Mulchand	837	1.71%	New
Independent	Parate Babulal Bhagwandin	526	1.08%	New
Independent	Burade Purushottam Pandurang	431	0.88%	New
Independent	Paranjpe Kashinath Dhundiraj	392	0.80%	New
Margin of victory		8,231	16.84%	▼12.13
Turnout		48,877	67.22%	▼21.19
Total valid votes		48,877		
Registered electors		72,709		▲110.37
INC hold		Swing	▼2.21	

=== Assembly Election 1952 ===
1952 Hyderabad State Legislative Assembly election : Nagpur I
Party	Candidate	Votes	%	±%
INC	Madangopal Jodharaj Agarwal	14,467	47.34%	New
SCF	Revaram Vithoba Kawade	5,614	18.37%	New
ABJS	Ramchandra Kashinath Manohar	5,231	17.12%	New
KMPP	Syed Minhaul Hasan Syed Maimuddin Ahmad	1,599	5.23%	New
Socialist	Pannalal Kanhaiyalal Deshraj	1,355	4.43%	New
CPI	Bhupendranath Mukherjee	645	2.11%	New
Independent	Anant Vishnu Khare	435	1.42%	New
Independent	Lala Jalnarain Lala Mohanlal	415	1.36%	New
Independent	Sadashiv Balwant Karkare	211	0.69%	New
Margin of victory		8,853	28.97%	
Turnout		30,557	88.41%	
Total valid votes		30,557		
Registered electors		34,563		
INC win (new seat)				
