= Sewree Assembly constituency =

Constituency of the Maharashtra legislative assembly in India

Sewree
- Former constituency for the Maharashtra Legislative Assembly

Constituency details
- Country: India
- Region: Western India
- State: Maharashtra
- Established: 1955
- Abolished: 1976
- Total electors: 102,600

Sewree Assembly constituency was an assembly constituency in the India state of Maharashtra.

== Members of the Legislative Assembly ==
Election	Member	Party
1957	Sawalram Gopal Patkar	Communist Party of India
1962	Sawalram Gopal Patkar	Communist Party of India
1967	Sawalram Gopal Patkar	Communist Party of India
1972	A. T. Alias Bhai Bhosle	Indian National Congress

== Election results ==
=== Assembly Election 1972 ===
1972 Maharashtra Legislative Assembly election : Sewree
Party	Candidate	Votes	%	±%
INC	A. T. Alias Bhai Bhosle	35,705	51.25%	▲17.52
SS	Dattaji Salvi	16,785	24.09%	New
CPI	Ganpat Laxman Patil	14,062	20.18%	▼27.65
RPI	Bhagwat Pagare	3,118	4.48%	New
Margin of victory		18,920	27.16%	▲13.05
Turnout		71,080	69.28%	▼0.55
Total valid votes		69,670		
Registered electors		1,02,600		▲9.27
INC gain from CPI		Swing	▲3.41	

=== Assembly Election 1967 ===
1967 Maharashtra Legislative Assembly election : Sewree
Party	Candidate	Votes	%	±%
CPI	Sawalram Gopal Patkar	30,163	47.84%	▼2.91
INC	V. B. Arolkar	21,266	33.73%	▼4.12
PSP	P. D. Shigwan	5,171	8.20%	▲0.94
ABJS	J. S. Gautam	3,672	5.82%	▲1.68
SWA	K. B. Mohite	2,781	4.41%	New
Margin of victory		8,897	14.11%	▲1.22
Turnout		65,564	69.83%	▲6.25
Total valid votes		63,053		
Registered electors		93,893		▼9.15
CPI hold		Swing	▼2.91	

=== Assembly Election 1962 ===
1962 Maharashtra Legislative Assembly election : Sewree
Party	Candidate	Votes	%	±%
CPI	Sawalram Gopal Patkar	33,341	50.74%	▼25.23
INC	Madhavrao Parsharam Thorat	24,871	37.85%	▲13.82
PSP	Bapoo Ramchandra Hatle	4,772	7.26%	New
ABJS	Ramchandra Balaji Mayekar	2,722	4.14%	New
Margin of victory		8,470	12.89%	▼39.05
Turnout		67,407	65.23%	▼4.83
Total valid votes		65,706		
Registered electors		1,03,345		▲44.77
CPI hold		Swing	▼25.23	

=== Assembly Election 1957 ===
1957 Bombay State Legislative Assembly election : Sewree
Party	Candidate	Votes	%	±%
CPI	Patkar Savlaram	37,100	75.97%	New
INC	Arolkar Vithal Baburao	11,736	24.03%	New
Margin of victory		25,364	51.94%	
Turnout		48,836	68.41%	
Total valid votes		48,836		
Registered electors		71,387		
CPI win (new seat)				
