= Mahalaxmi Assembly constituency =

Constituency of the Maharashtra legislative assembly in India

Mahalaxmi
- Former constituency for the Maharashtra Legislative Assembly

Constituency details
- Country: India
- Region: Western India
- State: Maharashtra
- Established: 1957
- Abolished: 1972
- Total electors: 74,080

Mahalaxmi Assembly constituency was an assembly constituency in the India state of Maharashtra.

== Members of the Legislative Assembly ==
Election	Member	Party
1957	Taleyarkhan Homi Jrhangir	Indian National Congress
1962	Jehangir Taleyarkhan Homi	Indian National Congress

== Election results ==
=== Assembly Election 1962 ===
1962 Maharashtra Legislative Assembly election : Mahalaxmi
Party	Candidate	Votes	%	±%
INC	Jehangir Taleyarkhan Homi	26,768	58.49%	▲5.30
CPI	Shantaram Sawalram Mirajkar	8,009	17.50%	New
Independent	Dara Dinshah Vania	7,577	16.56%	New
ABJS	Ramakant Anant Paradkar	1,455	3.18%	New
Independent	Kalkaprasad Maikoo Dhobi	601	1.31%	New
Independent	Dattatraya Mukund Nagarkatty	280	0.61%	New
Margin of victory		18,759	40.99%	▲34.61
Turnout		45,762	60.33%	▼2.15
Registered electors		74,080		▲25.09
INC hold		Swing	▲5.30	

=== Assembly Election 1957 ===
1957 Bombay State Legislative Assembly election : Mahalaxmi
Party	Candidate	Votes	%	±%
INC	Taleyarkhan Homi Jrhangir	20,136	53.19%	New
PSP	Tembe Vishwanath Krishna	17,720	46.81%	New
Margin of victory		2,416	6.38%	
Turnout		37,856	63.92%	
Registered electors		59,223		
INC win (new seat)				
