= Dharmabad Assembly constituency =

Constituency of the Maharashtra legislative assembly in India

Dharmabad
- Former constituency for the Maharashtra Legislative Assembly

Constituency details
- Country: India
- Region: Western India
- State: Maharashtra
- Established: 1957
- Abolished: 1962
- Total electors: 73,938

Dharmabad Assembly constituency was an assembly constituency in the India state of Maharashtra.

== Members of the Legislative Assembly ==
Election	Member	Party
1957	Chaudhan Shankarao Bhaurao	Indian National Congress
1962	Chaudhan Shankarao Bhaurao	Indian National Congress

== Election results ==
=== Assembly Election 1962 ===
1962 Maharashtra Legislative Assembly election : Dharmabad
Party	Candidate	Votes	%	±%
INC	Chaudhan Shankarao Bhaurao	25,065	60.07%	▼9.15
Independent	Konbderao Manoharrao	10,366	24.84%	New
Independent	Chandrao Mariba	1,416	3.39%	New
Independent	Gopalya Namya	1,184	2.84%	New
Independent	Vithalrao Wamanrao	1,116	2.67%	New
Margin of victory		14,699	35.23%	▼3.22
Turnout		41,728	52.95%	▲15.67
Registered electors		73,938		▲15.70
INC hold		Swing	▼9.15	

=== Assembly Election 1957 ===
1957 Bombay State Legislative Assembly election : Dharmabad
Party	Candidate	Votes	%	±%
INC	Chaudhan Shankarao Bhaurao	18,033	69.22%	New
CPI	Digambarrao Bapurao	8,018	30.78%	New
Margin of victory		10,015	38.44%	
Turnout		26,051	40.77%	
Registered electors		63,905		
INC win (new seat)				
