= Solapur City South Assembly constituency =

Constituency of the Maharashtra legislative assembly in India

Solapur City South
- Former constituency for the Maharashtra Legislative Assembly

Constituency details
- Country: India
- Region: Western India
- State: Maharashtra
- Established: 1951
- Abolished: 2008
- Total electors: 189,224

Solapur City South Assembly constituency was an assembly constituency in the India state of Maharashtra.

== Members of the Legislative Assembly ==
| Election | Member | Party |
|---|---|---|
| 1952 | Sane Govind Dattatraya | Peasants and Workers Party of India |
| 1957 | Dhavale Rajaram Sawalaram | Indian National Congress |
| 1962 | Dhavale Rajaram Sawalaram | Indian National Congress |
| 1967 | V. R. Patil | Independent politician |
| 1972 | Thokal Nirmala Shankar Rao | Indian National Congress |
| 1978 | Rone Bhimrao Laxmanrao | Janata Party |
| 1980 | Kamale Dinanath Shireppa | Indian National Congress |
| 1985 | Yalgulwar Prakash Balkrishna | Indian National Congress |
| 1990 | Yalgulwar Prakash Balkrishna | Indian National Congress |
| 1995 | Adam Narsayya Narayan | Communist Party of India |
| 1999 | Birajdar Patil Shivsharan Hanmantappa | Shiv Sena |
| 2004 | Adam Narsayya Narayan | Communist Party of India |

== Election results ==
=== Assembly Election 2004 ===
2004 Maharashtra Legislative Assembly election : Solapur City South
| Party | Candidate | Votes | % | ±% |
|---|---|---|---|---|
| CPI(M) | Adam Narsayya Narayan | 32,552 | 30.63% | ▲6.40 |
| SS | Shivsharan Hanmantappa Birajdar-patil | 27,361 | 25.74% | ▼3.30 |
| Independent | Dilip Bramhadeo Mane | 24,790 | 23.33% | New |
| Independent | Mohammad Salim A. Karim Kalyani | 12,077 | 11.36% | New |
| BSP | A. Razaque Nabilal Shaikh | 2,427 | 2.28% | ▲1.88 |
| SP | Shaikh Hazi Shahanaj Mahibub Sabe | 1,870 | 1.76% | ▼19.72 |
| Independent | Yadgir Syeed Ahmed Bujurajeruksab | 1,774 | 1.67% | New |
| Independent | Heman Jagannath Chitappa | 1,460 | 1.37% | New |
| Margin of victory | | 5,191 | 4.88% | ▲0.06 |
| Turnout | | 106,320 | 56.19% | ▼3.74 |
| Total valid votes | | 106,277 | | |
| Registered electors | | 189,224 | | ▲11.32 |
| CPI(M) gain from SS | | Swing | ▲1.59 | |

=== Assembly Election 1999 ===
1999 Maharashtra Legislative Assembly election : Solapur City South
| Party | Candidate | Votes | % | ±% |
|---|---|---|---|---|
| SS | Birajdar Patil Shivsharan Hanmantappa | 28,350 | 29.04% | ▲5.25 |
| CPI(M) | Adam Narsayya Narayan | 23,647 | 24.23% | ▼1.80 |
| INC | Yalgulwar Prakash Balkrishna | 22,981 | 23.54% | ▲9.38 |
| SP | Kalyani M. Salim A. Karim | 20,962 | 21.48% | New |
| Independent | Sangepang Babu Rangappa | 946 | 0.97% | New |
| Margin of victory | | 4,703 | 4.82% | ▲2.58 |
| Turnout | | 101,877 | 59.93% | ▼11.71 |
| Total valid votes | | 97,611 | | |
| Registered electors | | 169,989 | | ▲5.52 |
| SS gain from CPI(M) | | Swing | ▲3.01 | |

=== Assembly Election 1995 ===
1995 Maharashtra Legislative Assembly election : Solapur City South
| Party | Candidate | Votes | % | ±% |
|---|---|---|---|---|
| CPI(M) | Adam Narsayya Narayan | 29,589 | 26.03% | New |
| SS | Birajdar Patil Shivsharan Hanmantappa | 27,038 | 23.79% | ▼10.35 |
| INC | Yalgurwar Prakash Balkrishna | 16,093 | 14.16% | ▼21.18 |
| Independent | Surwase Dattatraya Sakharam | 11,138 | 9.80% | New |
| Independent | Kazi Saheblal Papamiya | 11,060 | 9.73% | New |
| JD | Tamshetty Suresh Sadashiv | 4,573 | 4.02% | New |
| Independent | Mulik Ashok Keshavrao | 1,834 | 1.61% | New |
| Independent | Chandele Hamirsingh Channusingh | 1,631 | 1.43% | New |
| Margin of victory | | 2,551 | 2.24% | ▲1.03 |
| Turnout | | 115,412 | 71.64% | ▲11.25 |
| Total valid votes | | 113,675 | | |
| Registered electors | | 161,099 | | ▲6.31 |
| CPI(M) gain from INC | | Swing | ▼9.31 | |

=== Assembly Election 1990 ===
1990 Maharashtra Legislative Assembly election : Solapur City South
| Party | Candidate | Votes | % | ±% |
|---|---|---|---|---|
| INC | Yalgurwar Prakash Balkrishna | 31,975 | 35.34% | ▼10.58 |
| SS | Birajdar Patil Shivsharan Hanmantappa | 30,884 | 34.14% | New |
| Independent | Khairdi A. Gafur Ismailsab | 24,591 | 27.18% | New |
| Independent | Yevalekar Solomon Shamrao | 552 | 0.61% | New |
| Margin of victory | | 1,091 | 1.21% | ▼8.15 |
| Turnout | | 91,510 | 60.39% | ▼1.64 |
| Total valid votes | | 90,473 | | |
| Registered electors | | 151,534 | | ▲29.47 |
| INC hold | | Swing | ▼10.58 | |

=== Assembly Election 1985 ===
1985 Maharashtra Legislative Assembly election : Solapur City South
| Party | Candidate | Votes | % | ±% |
|---|---|---|---|---|
| INC | Yalgulwar Prakash Balkrishna | 32,959 | 45.92% | New |
| IC(S) | Shaikh Mohammed Yunnns Jainoddin | 26,240 | 36.56% | New |
| CPI(M) | Adam Narsayya Narayan | 6,249 | 8.71% | New |
| Independent | Vidap Shrihari Ramayya | 5,174 | 7.21% | New |
| Independent | Gaikwad Kumar Bhivaji | 621 | 0.87% | New |
| Margin of victory | | 6,719 | 9.36% | ▼7.09 |
| Turnout | | 72,598 | 62.03% | ▲0.09 |
| Total valid votes | | 71,769 | | |
| Registered electors | | 117,042 | | ▲15.44 |
| INC gain from INC(I) | | Swing | ▼0.27 | |

=== Assembly Election 1980 ===
1980 Maharashtra Legislative Assembly election : Solapur City South
| Party | Candidate | Votes | % | ±% |
|---|---|---|---|---|
| INC(I) | Kamale Dinanath Shireppa | 28,635 | 46.19% | ▲11.98 |
| INC(U) | Shaikh Mohammed Yunnns Jainoddin | 18,437 | 29.74% | New |
| BJP | Valsangkar Padmakar Govind | 8,447 | 13.62% | New |
| JP | Rone Bhimrao Laxman | 5,788 | 9.34% | New |
| Independent | Ramchandra Dattatraya Paradkar | 548 | 0.88% | New |
| Margin of victory | | 10,198 | 16.45% | ▲15.89 |
| Turnout | | 62,800 | 61.94% | ▼6.16 |
| Total valid votes | | 61,999 | | |
| Registered electors | | 101,391 | | ▲7.12 |
| INC(I) gain from JP | | Swing | ▲11.42 | |

=== Assembly Election 1978 ===
1978 Maharashtra Legislative Assembly election : Solapur City South
| Party | Candidate | Votes | % | ±% |
|---|---|---|---|---|
| JP | Rone Bhimrao Laxmanrao | 22,085 | 34.77% | New |
| INC(I) | Kuchan Rajaram Sidramappa | 21,731 | 34.21% | New |
| CPI | Ganacharya Rambhau Venkatesh | 6,641 | 10.45% | New |
| INC | Thokal Nirma Atai Shankarrao | 6,191 | 9.75% | ▼47.19 |
| Independent | Khatib Sayyadali Yasufalli | 5,193 | 8.18% | New |
| Independent | Gaikwad Shivaji Ram | 917 | 1.44% | New |
| ABHM | Patil Vishnupant Ramrao | 387 | 0.61% | ▼18.65 |
| Margin of victory | | 354 | 0.56% | ▼36.54 |
| Turnout | | 64,464 | 68.10% | ▲1.24 |
| Total valid votes | | 63,520 | | |
| Registered electors | | 94,655 | | ▲33.05 |
| JP gain from INC | | Swing | ▼22.17 | |

=== Assembly Election 1972 ===
1972 Maharashtra Legislative Assembly election : Solapur City South
| Party | Candidate | Votes | % | ±% |
|---|---|---|---|---|
| INC | Thokal Nirmala Shankar Rao | 26,529 | 56.94% | ▲21.43 |
| Independent | Rone Bhimrao Laxmanrao | 9,245 | 19.84% | New |
| ABHM | Patil Vishnupant Ramrao | 8,973 | 19.26% | New |
| RPI | Baburao Sarawade | 1,222 | 2.62% | New |
| Independent | Ajisab Bableshwar | 347 | 0.74% | New |
| Margin of victory | | 17,284 | 37.10% | ▲35.29 |
| Turnout | | 47,565 | 66.86% | ▲1.60 |
| Total valid votes | | 46,590 | | |
| Registered electors | | 71,141 | | ▲7.91 |
| INC gain from Independent | | Swing | ▲19.63 | |

=== Assembly Election 1967 ===
1967 Maharashtra Legislative Assembly election : Solapur City South
| Party | Candidate | Votes | % | ±% |
|---|---|---|---|---|
| Independent | V. R. Patil | 15,105 | 37.31% | New |
| INC | V. S. Nanshetti | 14,373 | 35.51% | ▲3.46 |
| SWA | M. B. Shaikh | 6,643 | 16.41% | New |
| Independent | N. R. Beriya | 2,422 | 5.98% | New |
| Independent | B. G. Ughade | 1,612 | 3.98% | New |
| Independent | K. H. Chalwadi | 326 | 0.81% | New |
| Margin of victory | | 732 | 1.81% | ▼3.30 |
| Turnout | | 43,022 | 65.26% | ▲1.84 |
| Total valid votes | | 40,481 | | |
| Registered electors | | 65,924 | | ▼5.76 |
| Independent gain from INC | | Swing | ▲5.26 | |

=== Assembly Election 1962 ===
1962 Maharashtra Legislative Assembly election : Solapur City South
| Party | Candidate | Votes | % | ±% |
|---|---|---|---|---|
| INC | Rajaram Savalaram Dhavale | 12,904 | 32.05% | ▼22.34 |
| PSP | Rone Bhimrao Laxmanrao | 10,847 | 26.94% | New |
| Independent | Ahmad Haji Hannusher Hundekari | 7,487 | 18.59% | New |
| RPI | Ramchandra Sakharam Ranshringare | 5,870 | 14.58% | New |
| Independent | Murlidhar Dattatraya Mane | 2,196 | 5.45% | New |
| Independent | Shivappa Nagappa Umrage | 718 | 1.78% | New |
| Margin of victory | | 2,057 | 5.11% | ▼3.67 |
| Turnout | | 44,368 | 63.42% | ▼1.07 |
| Total valid votes | | 40,265 | | |
| Registered electors | | 69,955 | | ▲22.43 |
| INC hold | | Swing | ▼22.34 | |

=== Assembly Election 1957 ===
1957 Bombay State Legislative Assembly election : Solapur City South
| Party | Candidate | Votes | % | ±% |
|---|---|---|---|---|
| INC | Dhavale Rajaram Sawalaram | 20,042 | 54.39% | ▲18.42 |
| CPI | Sane Govindrao Dattatray | 16,806 | 45.61% | New |
| Margin of victory | | 3,236 | 8.78% | ▲5.74 |
| Turnout | | 36,848 | 64.49% | ▲23.00 |
| Total valid votes | | 36,848 | | |
| Registered electors | | 57,138 | | ▲10.16 |
| INC gain from PWPI | | Swing | ▲15.38 | |

=== Assembly Election 1952 ===
1952 Bombay State Legislative Assembly election : Solapur City South
| Party | Candidate | Votes | % | ±% |
|---|---|---|---|---|
| PWPI | Sane Govind Dattatraya | 8,396 | 39.01% | New |
| INC | Chandale Channusing Kalyansingh | 7,741 | 35.97% | New |
| Independent | Mulay Bhalchandra Waman | 3,311 | 15.38% | New |
| SCF | Shivsharan Udhav Dhondo | 2,075 | 9.64% | New |
| Margin of victory | | 655 | 3.04% | |
| Turnout | | 21,523 | 41.49% | |
| Total valid votes | | 21,523 | | |
| Registered electors | | 51,870 | | |
| PWPI win (new seat) | | | | |
