= Jawhar Assembly constituency =

Constituency of the Maharashtra legislative assembly in India

Jawhar
- Former constituency for the Maharashtra Legislative Assembly

Constituency details
- Country: India
- Region: Western India
- State: Maharashtra
- Established: 1952
- Abolished: 2008
- Total electors: 2,36,964

Jawhar Assembly constituency (formerly Jawahar) was an assembly constituency in the India state of Maharashtra.

== Members of the Legislative Assembly ==
Election	Member	Party
1952	Mukane Trimbak Bhau (St)	Indian National Congress
1957	Mukane Trimbak Bhau (St)	Indian National Congress
1962	Baburao Sadashiv Jadhav	Indian National Congress
1967	K. S. Karavande	Indian National Congress
1972	Ramchandra Gopal Bhoye	Indian National Congress
1978	Kurhada Barkya Lakhya	Communist Party of India
1980	Kom Lahanu Shidva	Communist Party of India
1985	Kom Lahanu Shidva	Communist Party of India
1990	Kom Lahanu Shidva	Communist Party of India
1995	Varatha Ramjee Mahadu	Communist Party of India
1999	Varatha Ramjee Mahadu	Communist Party of India
2004	Ozare Rajaram Nathu	Communist Party of India

== Election results ==
=== Assembly Election 2004 ===
2004 Maharashtra Legislative Assembly election : Jawhar
Party	Candidate	Votes	%	±%
CPI(M)	Ozare Rajaram Nathu	60,050	42.19%	▲1.05
BJP	Bhoye Harishchandra Sakharam	36,819	25.87%	▼1.50
Independent	Govind Hemant Ramachandra	28,721	20.18%	New
Independent	Phupane Chandrakant Balu	8,423	5.92%	New
BSP	Khetade Kashinath Bhika	5,074	3.56%	New
Independent	Jadhav Gopal Anant	3,256	2.29%	New
Margin of victory		23,231	16.32%	▲2.55
Turnout		142,345	60.07%	▲0.33
Total valid votes		142,343		
Registered electors		236,964		▲16.15
CPI(M) hold		Swing	▲1.05	

=== Assembly Election 1999 ===
1999 Maharashtra Legislative Assembly election : Jawhar
Party	Candidate	Votes	%	±%
CPI(M)	Varatha Ramjee Mahadu	47,475	41.14%	▼4.55
BJP	Vadu Kanchan Ramji	31,584	27.37%	▲2.52
NCP	Govind Hemant Ramachandra	27,481	23.81%	New
INC	Chavare Ravindra Yashvant	8,855	7.67%	▼21.79
Margin of victory		15,891	13.77%	▼2.46
Turnout		121,875	59.74%	▼6.80
Total valid votes		115,395		
Registered electors		204,024		▲4.57
CPI(M) hold		Swing	▼4.55	

=== Assembly Election 1995 ===
1995 Maharashtra Legislative Assembly election : Jawhar
Party	Candidate	Votes	%	±%
CPI(M)	Varatha Ramjee Mahadu	59,309	45.69%	▼2.50
INC	Patil Devidas Pandurang	38,245	29.46%	▲1.26
BJP	Wadu Kanchan Ramji	32,262	24.85%	▲2.15
Margin of victory		21,064	16.23%	▼3.76
Turnout		138,682	71.08%	▲14.95
Total valid votes		129,816		
Registered electors		195,099		▲23.07
CPI(M) hold		Swing	▼2.50	

=== Assembly Election 1990 ===
1990 Maharashtra Legislative Assembly election : Jawhar
Party	Candidate	Votes	%	±%
CPI(M)	Kom Lahanu Shidva	39,408	48.19%	▼6.83
INC	Kom Ladkya Radka	23,060	28.20%	▼9.23
BJP	Bhoye Sudesh Kakadya	18,563	22.70%	▲17.35
Independent	Ozare Jayvant Surji	545	0.67%	New
Margin of victory		16,348	19.99%	▲2.40
Turnout		84,287	53.17%	▲2.30
Total valid votes		81,782		
Registered electors		158,532		▲23.25
CPI(M) hold		Swing	▼6.83	

=== Assembly Election 1985 ===
1985 Maharashtra Legislative Assembly election : Jawhar
Party	Candidate	Votes	%	±%
CPI(M)	Kom Lahanu Shidva	34,882	55.02%	▲5.72
INC	Kirkira Tryambak Dhakal	23,728	37.43%	New
BJP	Raut Sakharam Ramji	3,393	5.35%	▼8.68
Independent	Ozare Jayvant Surji	786	1.24%	New
Independent	Talpade Shashikant Gangaram	609	0.96%	New
Margin of victory		11,154	17.59%	▲4.95
Turnout		65,942	51.27%	▲5.45
Total valid votes		63,398		
Registered electors		128,623		▲8.30
CPI(M) hold		Swing	▲5.72	

=== Assembly Election 1980 ===
1980 Maharashtra Legislative Assembly election : Jawhar
Party	Candidate	Votes	%	±%
CPI(M)	Kom Lahanu Shidva	25,671	49.30%	▼4.78
INC(I)	Kirkira Tryambak Dhakal	19,089	36.66%	New
BJP	Patil Sakharam Ramji	7,308	14.04%	New
Margin of victory		6,582	12.64%	▼10.21
Turnout		54,496	45.89%	▼5.62
Total valid votes		52,068		
Registered electors		118,765		▲6.12
CPI(M) hold		Swing	▼4.78	

=== Assembly Election 1978 ===
1978 Maharashtra Legislative Assembly election : Jawhar
Party	Candidate	Votes	%	±%
CPI(M)	Kurhada Barkya Lakhya	29,934	54.08%	▲45.51
INC	Bhoye Ramchandra Gopal	17,284	31.23%	▼19.67
Independent	Chaudhari Revaji Pandu	5,990	10.82%	New
Independent	Baburao Sadashiv Jadhav	2,144	3.87%	New
Margin of victory		12,650	22.85%	▲5.15
Turnout		59,240	52.93%	▲8.26
Total valid votes		55,352		
Registered electors		111,921		▲34.04
CPI(M) gain from INC		Swing	▲3.19	

=== Assembly Election 1972 ===
1972 Maharashtra Legislative Assembly election : Jawhar
Party	Candidate	Votes	%	±%
INC	Ramchandra Gopal Bhoye	17,508	50.89%	▲16.24
ABJS	Somnath Ramawani	11,419	33.19%	▲0.73
CPI(M)	Konda Lakhama Phadavale	2,949	8.57%	New
PWPI	Pandurang R. Patil	2,525	7.34%	New
Margin of victory		6,089	17.70%	▲15.92
Turnout		36,762	44.03%	▲1.22
Total valid votes		34,401		
Registered electors		83,497		▲17.17
INC hold		Swing	▲16.24	

=== Assembly Election 1967 ===
1967 Maharashtra Legislative Assembly election : Jawhar
Party	Candidate	Votes	%	±%
INC	K. S. Karavande	9,874	34.66%	▼9.55
SSP	Ramchandra Gopal Bhoye	9,367	32.88%	New
ABJS	Somnath Ramawani	9,250	32.47%	▲9.51
Margin of victory		507	1.78%	▼19.47
Turnout		31,521	44.23%	▼2.64
Total valid votes		28,491		
Registered electors		71,259		▼2.85
INC hold		Swing	▼9.55	

=== Assembly Election 1962 ===
1962 Maharashtra Legislative Assembly election : Jawhar
Party	Candidate	Votes	%	±%
INC	Baburao Sadashiv Jadhav	13,819	44.21%	▼6.82
ABJS	Somnath Ramawani	7,176	22.96%	New
PSP	Revji Pandu Chaudhari	6,123	19.59%	▼29.38
PWPI	Yeshwant Gunaji Ambekar	4,142	13.25%	New
Margin of victory		6,643	21.25%	▲19.19
Turnout		35,604	48.54%	▲1.37
Total valid votes		31,260		
Registered electors		73,347		▲31.39
INC hold		Swing	▼6.82	

=== Assembly Election 1957 ===
1957 Bombay State Legislative Assembly election : Jawhar
Party	Candidate	Votes	%	±%
INC	Mukane Trimbak Bhau (St)	11,751	51.03%	New
PSP	Lakhan Navasu Padu (St)	11,276	48.97%	New
Margin of victory		475	2.06%	
Turnout		23,027	41.25%	
Total valid votes		23,027		
Registered electors		55,826		
INC win (new seat)				
