= Khatav Assembly constituency =

Constituency of the Maharashtra legislative assembly in India

Khatav
- Former constituency for the Maharashtra Legislative Assembly

Constituency details
- Country: India
- Region: Western India
- State: Maharashtra
- Established: 1952
- Abolished: 2008
- Total electors: 191,961

Khatav Assembly constituency was an assembly constituency in the India state of Maharashtra.

== Members of the Legislative Assembly ==
Election	Member	Party
1952	Jadhav Tatya Anandrao	Indian National Congress
1957	Patil Keshavrao Shankarrao	Praja Socialist Party
1962	Shivajirao Dadasaheb Pawar	Indian National Congress
1967	R. G. Patil	Indian National Congress
1972	Patil Keshavrao Shankarrao	Independent politician
1978	Patil Keshavrao Shankarrao	Indian National Congress
1980	Patil Keshavrao Shankarrao	Indian National Congress
1985	Gudage Mohanrao Pandurang	Independent politician
1990	Gudage Mohanrao Pandurang	Indian National Congress
1995	Gudage Mohanrao Pandurang	Independent politician
1999	Gudage Mohanrao Pandurang	Nationalist Congress Party
2004	Dilip Muralidhar Yelgaonkar	Bharatiya Janata Party

== Election results ==
=== Assembly Election 2004 ===
2004 Maharashtra Legislative Assembly election : Khatav
Party	Candidate	Votes	%	±%
BJP	Dilip Muralidhar Yelgaonkar	76,435	55.72%	▲16.98
Independent	Gharge Prabhakar Devaba	30,744	22.41%	New
NCP	Jitendra Natha Pawar	24,648	17.97%	▼22.24
Independent	Shivajirao Vaman Mane	1,479	1.08%	New
BSP	Baile Kantabai Ashok	1,466	1.07%	New
Independent	Torane Prakash Mahadev	1,186	0.86%	New
Margin of victory		45,691	33.31%	▲31.84
Turnout		137,298	71.52%	▲0.75
Total valid votes		137,176		
Registered electors		191,961		▲18.95
BJP gain from NCP		Swing	▲15.51	

=== Assembly Election 1999 ===
1999 Maharashtra Legislative Assembly election : Khatav
Party	Candidate	Votes	%	±%
NCP	Gudage Mohanrao Pandurang	42,813	40.21%	New
BJP	Yelgaonkar Dilip Murlidhar	41,249	38.74%	New
INC	Jadhav Suersh Sarjerao	21,753	20.43%	▼21.64
Margin of victory		1,564	1.47%	▲0.99
Turnout		114,201	70.77%	▼8.60
Total valid votes		106,485		
Registered electors		161,379		▲1.78
NCP gain from Independent		Swing	▼2.34	

=== Assembly Election 1995 ===
1995 Maharashtra Legislative Assembly election : Khatav
Party	Candidate	Votes	%	±%
Independent	Gudage Mohanrao Pandurang	52,514	42.55%	New
INC	Bagal Aarunrao Shivram	51,919	42.07%	▼10.58
SS	Korade Bhanudas Ekanath	14,704	11.91%	▲4.79
Independent	Khatavkar Vishnupant Krishna	1,383	1.12%	New
BSP	Thombare Tanaji Namdeo	1,138	0.92%	New
Margin of victory		595	0.48%	▼13.12
Turnout		125,848	79.37%	▲9.38
Total valid votes		123,424		
Registered electors		158,552		▲3.41
Independent gain from INC		Swing	▼10.10	

=== Assembly Election 1990 ===
1990 Maharashtra Legislative Assembly election : Khatav
Party	Candidate	Votes	%	±%
INC	Gudage Mohanrao Pandurang	55,481	52.65%	▲16.73
JD	Bagal Arunrao Shivaram	41,150	39.05%	New
SS	Jadhav Shivajirao Nanaso	7,500	7.12%	New
Margin of victory		14,331	13.60%	▲4.91
Turnout		107,316	69.99%	▼4.76
Total valid votes		105,387		
Registered electors		153,322		▲28.01
INC gain from Independent		Swing	▲8.05	

=== Assembly Election 1985 ===
1985 Maharashtra Legislative Assembly election : Khatav
Party	Candidate	Votes	%	±%
Independent	Gudage Mohanrao Pandurang	39,267	44.60%	New
INC	Patil Keshavrao Shankarrao	31,620	35.92%	New
IC(S)	Jadhav Laxmanrao Nagesh	14,245	16.18%	New
RPI	Chandrakant Nathu Mane	2,493	2.83%	New
Margin of victory		7,647	8.69%	▼6.55
Turnout		89,530	74.75%	▲7.23
Total valid votes		88,034		
Registered electors		119,777		▲11.37
Independent gain from INC(I)		Swing	▼11.98	

=== Assembly Election 1980 ===
1980 Maharashtra Legislative Assembly election : Khatav
Party	Candidate	Votes	%	±%
INC(I)	Patil Keshavrao Shankarrao	40,101	56.58%	New
INC(U)	Mane Hanamantrao Jijaba	29,301	41.34%	New
Independent	Jadhav Baburao Anandrao	1,476	2.08%	New
Margin of victory		10,800	15.24%	▼5.55
Turnout		72,617	67.52%	▼10.27
Total valid votes		70,878		
Registered electors		107,553		▲8.00
INC(I) gain from INC		Swing	▲0.29	

=== Assembly Election 1978 ===
1978 Maharashtra Legislative Assembly election : Khatav
Party	Candidate	Votes	%	±%
INC	Patil Keshavrao Shankarrao	42,404	56.29%	▲13.90
JP	Patil Chnandrahar Alias Ramchandra Ganpatrao	26,742	35.50%	New
PWPI	Baile Ashok Maruti	2,159	2.87%	New
Independent	Jadhav Bapurao Anandrao	1,809	2.40%	New
Independent	Bapu Bhau Kachare	1,137	1.51%	New
Independent	Bhimrao Maruti Jagtap	1,025	1.36%	New
Margin of victory		15,662	20.79%	▲6.24
Turnout		77,467	77.79%	▲0.94
Total valid votes		75,336		
Registered electors		99,590		▲10.46
INC gain from Independent		Swing	▼0.65	

=== Assembly Election 1972 ===
1972 Maharashtra Legislative Assembly election : Khatav
Party	Candidate	Votes	%	±%
Independent	Keshavarao S. Patil	38,342	56.94%	New
INC	Chandrahar Patil	28,543	42.39%	▼39.06
Independent	Karkhani S. R. Bando	448	0.67%	New
Margin of victory		9,799	14.55%	▼54.12
Turnout		69,287	76.85%	▲10.22
Total valid votes		67,333		
Registered electors		90,160		▲12.85
Independent gain from INC		Swing	▼24.51	

=== Assembly Election 1967 ===
1967 Maharashtra Legislative Assembly election : Khatav
Party	Candidate	Votes	%	±%
INC	R. G. Patil	40,529	81.45%	▲24.87
CPI	S. S. Jadhav	6,357	12.78%	New
ABJS	V. N. Shete	2,875	5.78%	New
Margin of victory		34,172	68.67%	▲49.55
Turnout		53,234	66.63%	▲5.21
Total valid votes		49,761		
Registered electors		79,896		▲7.08
INC hold		Swing	▲24.87	

=== Assembly Election 1962 ===
1962 Maharashtra Legislative Assembly election : Khatav
Party	Candidate	Votes	%	±%
INC	Shivajirao Dadasaheb Pawar	24,477	56.58%	▲27.60
PSP	Keshav Shankar Patil	16,205	37.46%	▼33.56
PWPI	Nivrittirao Marutirao Deshmukh	2,579	5.96%	New
Margin of victory		8,272	19.12%	▼22.93
Turnout		45,824	61.42%	▲4.09
Total valid votes		43,261		
Registered electors		74,610		▲17.02
INC gain from PSP		Swing	▼14.44	

=== Assembly Election 1957 ===
1957 Bombay State Legislative Assembly election : Khatav
Party	Candidate	Votes	%	±%
PSP	Patil Keshav Shankar	25,964	71.02%	New
INC	Gharge Hirabai Parashram	10,593	28.98%	▼22.04
Margin of victory		15,371	42.05%	▲24.40
Turnout		36,557	57.33%	▲2.30
Total valid votes		36,557		
Registered electors		63,761		▲8.28
PSP gain from INC		Swing	▲20.00	

=== Assembly Election 1952 ===
1952 Bombay State Legislative Assembly election : Khatav
Party	Candidate	Votes	%	±%
INC	Jadhav Tatya Anandrao	16,532	51.02%	New
Independent	Bhosle Babasaheb Anandrao	10,812	33.37%	New
PWPI	Patil Anand Krishnarao	2,979	9.19%	New
Independent	Ambike Shankar Raghunath	2,082	6.42%	New
Margin of victory		5,720	17.65%	
Turnout		32,405	55.03%	
Total valid votes		32,405		
Registered electors		58,884		
INC win (new seat)				
