= Nagpur Assembly constituency =

Constituency of the Maharashtra legislative assembly in India

Nagpur
- Former constituency for the Maharashtra Legislative Assembly

Constituency details
- Country: India
- Region: Western India
- State: Maharashtra
- Established: 1955
- Abolished: 1964
- Total electors: 66,600
- Reservation: SC

Nagpur Assembly constituency was an assembly constituency in the India state of Maharashtra.

== Members of the Legislative Assembly ==
Election	Member	Party
1957	Bardhan Ardhendubhushan Hemendra Kumar	Independent politician
1957	Shambharkar Punjabrao Hukam (Sc)	Scheduled Castes Federation
1962	Shusilabai Balraj	Indian National Congress

== Election results ==
=== Assembly Election 1962 ===
1962 Maharashtra Legislative Assembly election : Nagpur
Party	Candidate	Votes	%	±%
INC	Shusilabai Balraj	12,859	29.58%	▲8.91
CPI	Ardhendu Bhushan Hemendra Kumar Bardhan	12,701	29.22%	New
Independent	Govind Gopal Bhambulkar	11,059	25.44%	New
ABJS	Sumati Balkrishna Suklikar	6,385	14.69%	New
Independent	Vijayakant Mukundrao Fulzele	313	0.72%	New
Margin of victory		158	0.36%	▼0.27
Turnout		45,000	67.57%	▼52.10
Total valid votes		43,473		
Registered electors		66,600		▼31.56
INC gain from Independent		Swing	▲6.72	

=== Assembly Election 1957 ===
1957 Bombay State Legislative Assembly election : Nagpur
Party	Candidate	Votes	%	±%
Independent	Bardhan Ardhendubhushan Hemendra Kumar	26,616	22.86%	New
SCF	Shambharkar Punjabrao Hukam (Sc)	25,878	22.22%	New
INC	Borkar Anusayabai W/O Bhaurao (Sc)	24,073	20.67%	New
INC	Gawande Wamanrao Govindrao	24,012	20.62%	New
PSP	Awari Manchearsha Rusramji	11,822	10.15%	New
Independent	Changole Vinayak Jagannath (Sc)	2,427	2.08%	New
Independent	Nagabai W/O Kesheao Alias Chintaman (Sc)	1,619	1.39%	New
Margin of victory		738	0.63%	
Turnout		1,16,447	119.66%	
Total valid votes		1,16,447		
Registered electors		97,312		
Independent win (new seat)				
