= Kantilal Premchand Shah =

Indian politician (1907–1993)

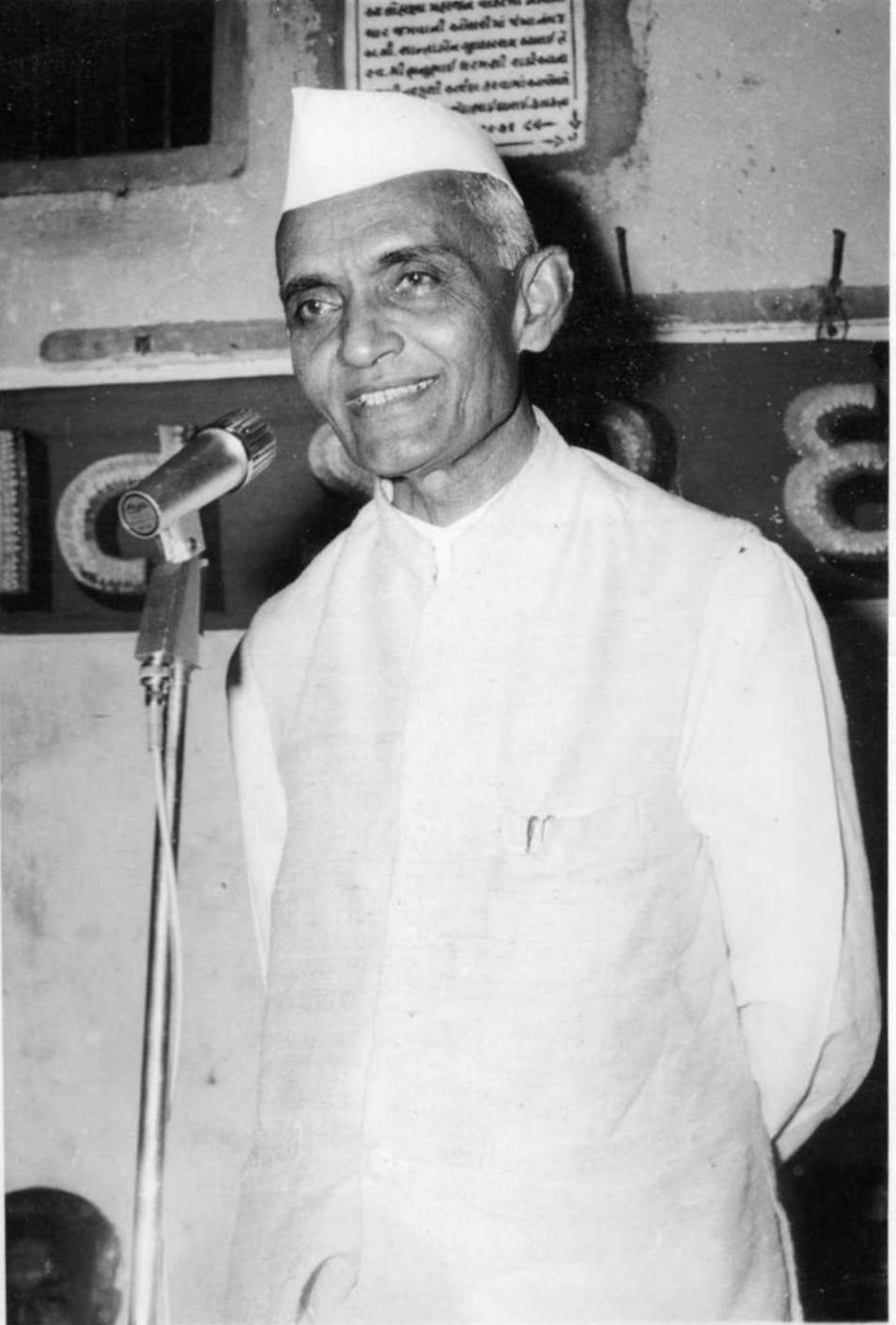

Member of the Gujarat Legislative Assembly
- In office 25 February 1957 – 19 January 1962
- Constituency: Vijapur

Personal details
- Born: 20 May 1907 Gandhinagar, Bombay State, India
- Died: 19 January 1993 (aged 85)
- Party: Indian National Congress

Kantibhai Premchand Shah (20 May 1907 – 19 January 1993), also known as KP Shah, was an Indian politician and businessman from Gujarat, India. He was member of Gujarat Legislative Assembly representing Jodiya Assembly constituency as a member of the Indian National congress. He was known for contributions in textiles sectors, transportation, and local governance.

== Early life and career ==
Shah started his political career as the Madhyaksha of Jamnagar City Municipality from 1953 to 1956. His leadership during this period was valuable in the development of Jamnagar, with the construction of a town hall. He was elected to the Gujarat Legislative Assembly multiple times, first serving from 1957 and later from 1972 until March 1977, representing the Jodia division of Jamnagar district. Throughout his tenure, he was involved in various committees and served as an assistant member of the Election Commission.

He was the Chairman of Gujarat State Transport Corporation from 1966 to 1968 and later served as the Chairman of Gujarat State Textile Corporation from 1971 to 1975. His involvement extended to cooperative banking as he was a director for both the Gujarat State Co-operative Bank and the Gujarat State Land Development Bank. Additionally, he was associated with the All-India Co-operative Spinning Mills Federation and served on the National Consumer Co-operative Federation.

== Social work ==
In addition to his political and business roles, KP Shah was engaged in social initiatives. He founded the Industrial Estate in Jamnagar and contributed to the establishment of small industries in the region during the 1960s and 1970s. He was also involved in education, serving as president of Sri Gangajala Vidyapeeth since 1957. Shah held positions in various organizations, including the District Education Committee and the Industrial Training Center Trust for the Blind.

Shah was known for his philanthropy and social initiatives. He founded the Industrial Estate in Jamnagar and contributed to the establishment of small industries in the region during the 1960s and 1970s. He was also involved in education, serving as president of Sri Gangajala Vidyapeeth since 1957.Shah held leadership positions in various organizations, including the District Education Committee and the Industrial Training Center Trust for the Blind, reflecting his involvement in community service.

Shri Vidyottejak Mandal

In 1953 Shah formed Shri Vidyottejak Mandal, an Indian organisation which aims to establish educational institutions, with Harjivandas V. Bardanwala and other social workers, and was president of the organisation from 1989 to his death in 1993.
