= 2004 Maharashtra Legislative Assembly election =

Maharashtra State Assembly Elections 2004
- 13 October 2004

All 288 assembly constituencies 145 seats needed for a majority
- Turnout: 63.44% (▲2.49%)
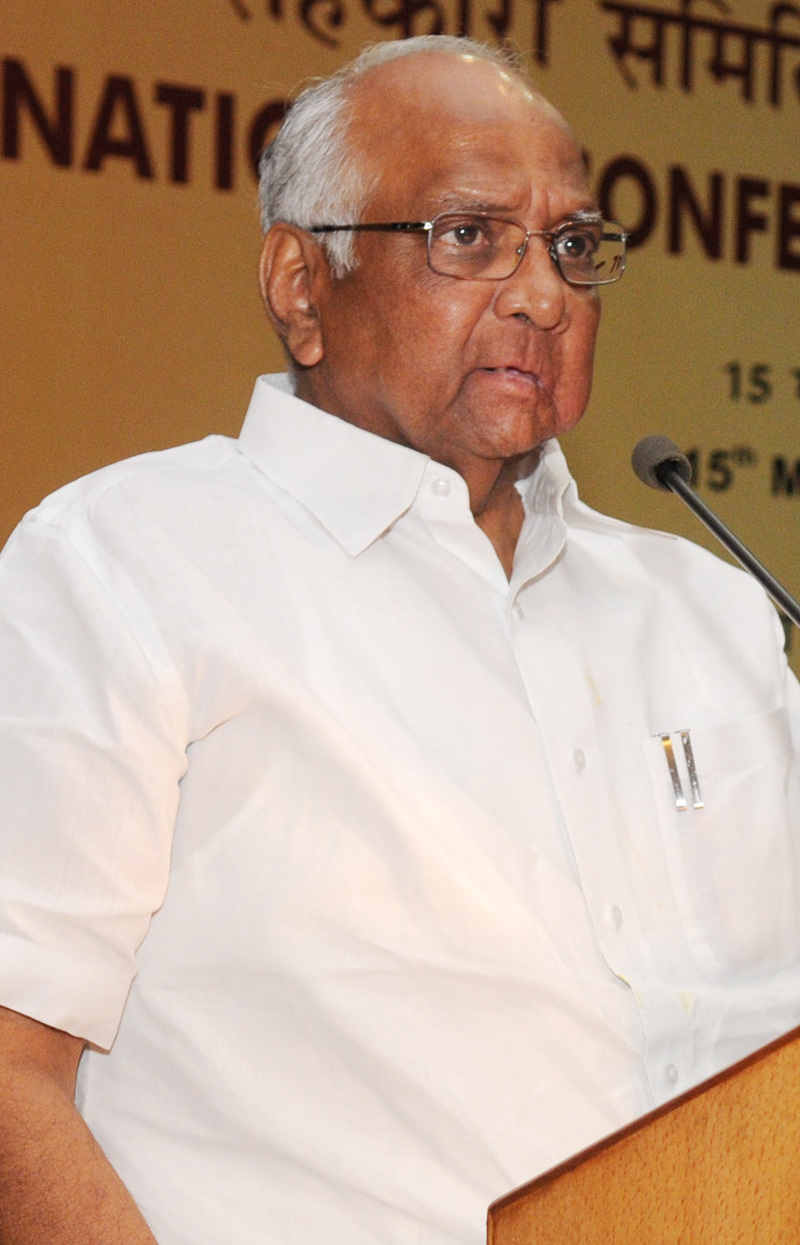

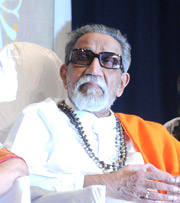

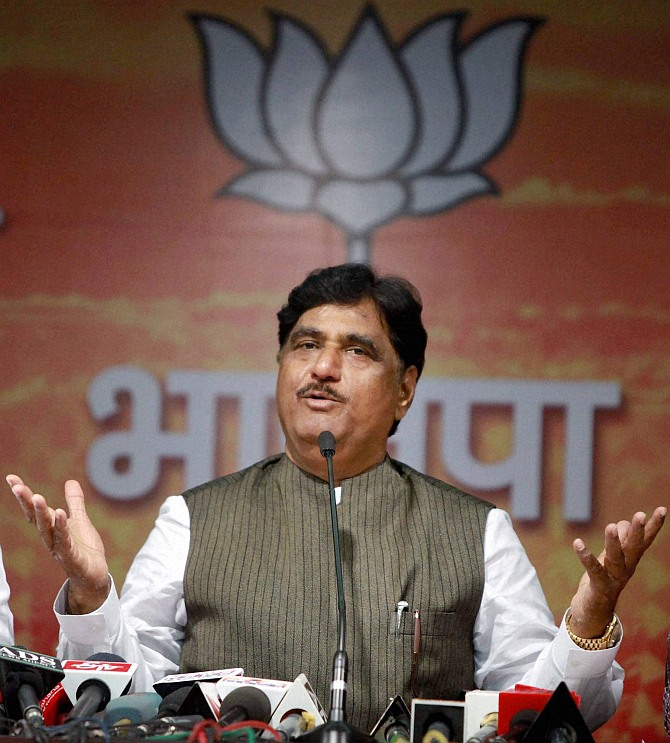
	First party	Second party
Leader	Sharad Pawar	Vilasrao Deshmukh
Party	NCP	INC
Alliance	UPA	UPA
Leader's seat	Did not contest	Latur City
Last election	58	75
Seats won	71	69
Seat change	▲13	▼6
Popular vote	7,841,962	8,810,363
Percentage	18.75%	21.06%
Swing	▼3.85%	▼6.14%
Alliance seats	140	140
Seat change	▼9	▼9
	Third party	Fourth party
Leader	Balasaheb Thackeray	Gopinath Munde
Party	SS	BJP
Alliance	NDA	NDA
Leader's seat	Did not contest	Renapur
Last election	69	56
Seats won	62	54
Seat change	▼7	▼2
Popular vote	8,351,654	5,717,287
Percentage	19.97%	13.67%
Swing	▲2.64%	▼0.87%
Alliance seats	116	116
Seat change	▼12	▼12
Chief Minister before election
Sushil Kumar Shinde
INC
Elected Chief Minister
Vilasrao Deshmukh
INC

Assembly elections was held in Maharashtra, India on October 13, 2004. The major alliances were the Democratic Front and the Bharatiya Janata Party - Shiv Sena alliance. Other political parties contested were the Bahujan Samaj Party, the Samajwadi Party, the Rashtriya Janata Dal, and the LJP. 66,000 electronic voting machines were used to elect the 288 members of the Maharashtra legislative assembly.

== Results ==
List of Political Parties participated in 2004 Maharashtra Assembly Elections.

Party	Abbreviation
National Parties
Bharatiya Janata Party	BJP
Indian National Congress	INC
Nationalist Congress Party	NCP
Communist Party of India (Marxist)	CPM
Communist Party of India	CPI
Bahujan Samaj Party	BSP
State Parties
Shiv Sena	SHS
Muslim League Kerala State Committee	MUL
Janata Dal (United)	JD(U)
Janata Dal (Secular)	JD(S)
Rashtriya Lok Dal	RLD
Samajwadi Party	SP
All India Forward Bloc	AIFB
Registered (Unrecognised) Parties
Akhil Bharatiya Hindu Mahasabha	HMS
Indian Union Muslim League	IUML
Swatantra Bharat Paksha	STBP
Akhil Bharatiya Sena	ABHS
Janata Party	JP
Hindustan Janata Party	HJP
Samajwadi Janata Party (Rashtriya)	SJP(R)
Samajwadi Janata Party (Maharashtra)	SJP(M)
Samajwadi Jan Parishad	SWJP
Peasants and Workers Party	PWP
All India Forward Bloc (Subhasist)	AIFB(S)
Republican Party of India	RPI
Republican Party of India (Athawale)	RPI(A)
Republican Party of India (Democratic)	RPI(D)
Republican Party of India (Kamble)	RPI(KM)
Peoples Republican Party/RPI (Kawade)	PRBP
Bharipa Bahujan Mahasangh	BBM
Jan Surajya Shakti	JSS
Rashtriya Samaj Paksha	RSPS
Apna Dal	AD
Lok Janshakti Party	LJP
Lok Rajya Party	LRP
Indian Justice Party	IJP
Bharatiya Minorities Suraksha Mahasangh	BMSM
National Loktantrik Party	NLP
Womanist Party of India	WPI
Gondwana Ganatantra Party	GGP
Vidharbha Janata Congress	VJC
Nag Vidarbha Andolan Samiti	NVAS
Vidharbha Rajya Party	VRP
Native People's Party	NVPP
Hindu Ekta Andolan Party	HEAP
Shivrajya Party	SVRP
Sachet Bharat Party	SBHP
Bharatiya Rashtriya Swadeshi Congress Paksh	BRSCP
Kranti Kari Jai Hind Sena	KKJHS
All India Krantikari Congress	AIKC
Maharashtra Rajiv Congress	MRRC
Maharashtra Secular Front	MSF
Prabuddha Republican Party	PRCP
Ambedkarist Republican Party	ARP
Bahujan Mahasangha Paksha	BMSP
Rashtriya Samajik Nayak Paksha	RSNP
Savarn Samaj Party	SVSP

The result was announced on October 17, 2004, the Nationalist Congress Party(NCP) emerged as the largest party with 71 Seats along with its ally Congress in second position with 69 Seats.The BJP-Shiv Sena Alliance lost election winning 54 and 62 seats respectively that lead to resignation of Venkaiah Naidu and followed by leading command of party to Lal Krishna Advani.

Summary of results of the Maharashtra State Assembly election, 2004

Political Party	Seats			Popular Vote		
Political Party	Contested	Won	+/-	Votes polled	Votes%	+/-
Nationalist Congress Party 71 / 288 (25%)	124	71 / 124 (57%)	▲13	7,841,962	18.75%	▼3.85%
Indian National Congress 69 / 288 (24%)	157	69 / 157 (44%)	▼6	8,810,363	21.06%	▼6.14%
Shiv Sena 62 / 288 (22%)	163	62 / 163 (38%)	▼7	8,351,654	19.97%	▲2.64%
Bharatiya Janata Party 54 / 288 (19%)	111	54 / 111 (49%)	▼2	5,717,287	13.67%	▼0.87%
Jan Surajya Shakti 4 / 288 (1%)	19	4 / 19 (21%)	▲4	368,156	0.88%	▲0.88% (New Party)
Communist Party of India (Marxist) 3 / 288 (1%)	16	3 / 16 (19%)	▲1	259,567	0.62%	▼0.02%
Peasants and Workers Party of India 2 / 288 (0.7%)	43	2 / 43 (5%)	▼3	549,010	1.31%	▼0.18%
Bharipa Bahujan Mahasangh 1 / 288 (0.3%)	83	1 / 83 (1%)	▼2	516,221	1.23%	▼0.62%
Republican Party of India (Athawale) 1 / 288 (0.3%)	20	1 / 20 (5%)	▲1	206,175	0.49%	▲0.49% (New Party)
Swatantra Bharat Paksh 1 / 288 (0.3%)	7	1 / 7 (14%)	▲1	176,022	0.42%	▲0.05%
Akhil Bharatiya Sena 1 / 288 (0.3%)	20	1 / 20 (5%)	▲1	69,986	0.17%	▲0.01%
Bahujan Samaj Party	272	0	Steady	1,671,429	4.00%	▲3.61%
Samajwadi Party	95	0	▼2	471,425	1.13%	▲0.44%
Janata Dal (Secular)	34	0	▼2	242,720	0.58%	▼0.93%
Republican Party of India	4	0	▼1	62,531	0.15%	▼0.54%
Gondwana Ganatantra Party	30	0	▼1	58,288	0.14%	▼0.06%
Samajwadi Janata Party (Maharashtra)	4	0	▼1	25,866	0.06%	▼0.07%
Native People's Party	1	0	▼1	315	0.00%	▼0.19%
Independents 19 / 288 (7%)	1083	19 / 1,083 (2%)	▲7	58,77,454	14.05%	▲4.56%
Total	2678	288	Steady	4,18,29,645	63.44%	▲2.49%

== Region-wise Breakup ==
Region	Total seats								
Region	Total seats	NCP		INC		SHS		BJP	
Region	Total seats	Seats Won		Seats Won		Seats Won		Seats Won	
Western Maharashtra	67	26	▲03	17	▼01	10	▲01	08	▲04
Vidarbha	60	09	▲05	18	▼06	04	▼03	19	▼04
Marathwada	46	10	▲04	07	▼08	14	▼02	12	▲01
Thane+Konkan	35	11	▲06	02	▲02	12	▼02	04	▼01
Mumbai	35	03	▼10	15	▲05	09	▼02	05	▼03
North Maharashtra	44	12	▲05	10	▲02	13	▲01	06	▼01
Total	288	71	▲13	69	▼06	62	▼07	54	▼02

Region	Total seats	United Progressive Alliance		National Democratic Alliance	
Region	Total seats	Nationalist Congress Party	Indian National Congress	Shiv Sena	Bharatiya Janata Party
Western Maharashtra	67	26 / 67 (39%)	17 / 67 (25%)	10 / 67 (15%)	08 / 67 (12%)
Vidarbha	60	09 / 60 (15%)	18 / 60 (30%)	04 / 60 (7%)	19 / 60 (32%)
Marathwada	46	10 / 46 (22%)	07 / 46 (15%)	14 / 46 (30%)	12 / 46 (26%)
Thane+Konkan	35	11 / 35 (31%)	02 / 35 (6%)	12 / 39 (31%)	04 / 39 (10%)
Mumbai	35	03 / 35 (9%)	15 / 36 (42%)	09 / 36 (25%)	04 / 35 (11%)
North Maharashtra	44	12 / 44 (27%)	10 / 44 (23%)	13 / 44 (30%)	06 / 35 (17%)
Total	288	71 / 288 (25%)	69 / 288 (24%)	62 / 288 (22%)	54 / 288 (19%)

Region	Total Seats	United Progressive Alliance		National Democratic Alliance		Others	
Western Maharashtra	70	▼3	45 / 70 (64%)	▼1	17 / 70 (24%)	▼4	8 / 70 (11%)
Vidarbha	62	Steady	23 / 62 (37%)	▲7	32 / 62 (52%)	▼7	7 / 70 (10%)
Marathwada	46	▲6	26 / 46 (57%)	▲1	18 / 46 (39%)	▼5	2 / 46 (4%)
Thane +Konkan	39	Steady	7 / 39 (18%)	▲5	29 / 39 (74%)	▼5	3 / 39 (8%)
Mumbai	36	▲2	9 / 36 (25%)	▼3	15 / 36 (42%)	▲1	12 / 36 (33%)
North Maharashtra	35	▲2	30 / 35 (86%)	▼6	5 / 35 (14%)	Steady	0 / 35 (0%)
Total		▲7	140 / 288 (49%)	▼9	116 / 288 (40%)	▼12	32 / 288 (11%)

Name of Division	District	Seats	NCP		INC		SHS		BJP	
Amravati Division	Akola	5	01	▲01	01	▼04	02	▲02	01	▲01
Amravati Division	Amravati	8	02	▲01	03	▲01	01	▼2	02	Steady
Amravati Division	Buldhana	7	01	▲01	02	▼01	01	▼3	01	▲01
Amravati Division	Yavatmal	7	03	▲02	02	▲02	01	Steady	0	▼01
Amravati Division	Washim	3	02	▲01	02	▲01	01	Steady	0	Steady
Total Seats		30	9	▲7	10	▼5	6	▼5	4	▲1
Aurangabad Division	Aurangabad	9	02	▲02	03	▼01	01	▼4	01	▲01
Aurangabad Division	Beed	6	03	▲02	02	▲01	2	▲01	01	▼2
Aurangabad Division	Jalna	5	5	▲4	0	▼3	0	▼01	01	▲01
Aurangabad Division	Osmanabad	4	3	▲01	01	Steady	01	Steady	01	▲01
Aurangabad Division	Nanded	9	4	Steady	5	▲5	2	▲01	01	▼2
Aurangabad Division	Latur	6	01	Steady	3	▲02	01	Steady	01	▼2
Aurangabad Division	Parbhani	4	0	▼01	0	▼01	01	▼01	01	▲01
Aurangabad Division	Hingoli	3	0	Steady	0	▼01	0	▼2	0	Steady
Total Seats		46	18	▲8	15	▲3	8	▼7	7	▼2
Konkan Division	Mumbai City	9	1	▲01	3	Steady	5	▼01	1	▲1
Konkan Division	Mumbai Suburban	26	02	▼3	8	▲4	14	▼01	2	Steady
Konkan Division	Thane	24	02	▼2	0	▼1	4	▼01	0	▼5
Konkan Division	Raigad	7	02	Steady	1	▲01	02	▼3	0	Steady
Konkan Division	Ratnagiri	3	1	Steady	0	Steady	02	▲1	0	Steady
Total Seats		69	8	▲1	12	▲4	27	▼6	3	▼4
Nagpur Division	Bhandara	3	01	▲01	02	▲01	01	▼01	3	▲3
Nagpur Division	Chandrapur	6	01	▲01	02	Steady	01	Steady	02	▼01
Nagpur Division	Gadchiroli	3	01	Steady	01	Steady	01	Steady	3	▲3
Nagpur Division	Gondia	4	01	Steady	02	▲01	01	▲01	4	▲2
Nagpur Division	Nagpur	12	01	▲01	6	▲5	01	Steady	4	▼6
Nagpur Division	Wardha	4	01	▲01	03	▲02	0	Steady	4	▲4
Total Seats		32	6	▲4	16	▲9	5	Steady	20	▲5
Nashik Division	Dhule	5	01	▲01	02	Steady	01	▼2	01	▲01
Nashik Division	Jalgaon	11	4	▲3	02	▲02	2	▲01	3	▼2
Nashik Division	Nandurbar	4	01	▲01	1	▼3	01	▲01	01	▲01
Nashik Division	Nashik	15	5	▼2	02	▼01	3	▲2	02	▼2
Nashik Division	Ahmednagar	12	01	▲01	1	▼01	01	▲01	4	▲02
Total Seats		47	12	▲4	8	▼10	8	▲3	11	Steady
Pune Division	Kolhapur	10	5	▼2	01	▼01	02	▲01	02	▲2
Pune Division	Pune	21	07	▼06	3	▼5	01	▲01	04	▲4
Pune Division	Sangli	8	3	▲02	3	▲01	02	▲02	01	▼3
Pune Division	Satara	8	2	▲01	0	▼01	02	▲02	02	▼3
Pune Division	Solapur	13	05	▼01	02	▼01	03	▲01	01	▲01
Total Seats		58	18	▼5	8	▼7	8	▲6	9	▼2
Total Seats		288	71	▲13	69	▼6	62	▼7	54	▼2
Total Seats			140				116			

== Alliance-wise Results ==
71	69	62	54
NCP	INC	SHS	BJP

Alliance	Political Party	Seats	Total Seats
UPA	Nationalist Congress Party	71	152
UPA	Indian National Congress	69	152
UPA	Communist Party of India (Marxist)	3	152
UPA	Peasants and Workers Party of India	2	152
UPA	Independents	7	152
NDA	Shiv Sena	62	128
NDA	Bharatiya Janata Party	54	128
NDA	Independents	12	128

== Results by constituency ==
Winner, runner-up, voter turnout, and victory margin in every constituency
Assembly Constituency		Turnout	Winner				Runner Up				Margin
#k	Names	%	Candidate	Party	Votes	%	Candidate	Party	Votes	%	Margin
Sindhudurg District
1	Sawantwadi	65.84%	Dalvi Shivram Gopal	SS	39,152	36.85%	Bhonsle Pravin Prataprao	NCP	34,868	32.82%	4,284
2	Vengurla	64.45%	Shankar Shivram Kambli	SS	49,474	55.67%	Pushpasen Sawant	INC	31,532	35.48%	17,942
3	Malvan	72.54%	Narayan Tatu Rane	SS	63,784	65.88%	Vijay Sawant	INC	29,639	30.61%	34,145
4	Deogad	73.26%	Ajit Pandurang Gogate	BJP	42,384	48.28%	Kuldeep Pednekar	NCP	41,312	47.06%	1,072
Ratnagiri District
5	Rajapur	66.61%	Kadam Ganpat Daulat	SS	52,231	56.07%	Harish Sitaram Rogye	INC	35,952	38.60%	16,279
6	Ratnagiri	65.76%	Uday Ravindra Samant	NCP	63,233	46.95%	Balasaheb Mane	BJP	57,188	42.46%	6,045
7	Sangameshwar	68.68%	Bane Subhash Shantaram	SS	55,431	53.15%	Bhayaje Suresh Laxman	Independent	21,662	20.77%	33,769
8	Guhagar	68.32%	Dr. Vinay Shridhar Natu	BJP	59,119	58.77%	Nandkishor Rajaram Pawar	NCP	30,936	30.75%	28,183
9	Chiplun	74.24%	Kadam Rameshbhai Ramchandra	NCP	53,311	47.65%	Bhaskar Jadhav	Independent	48,025	42.92%	5,286
10	Khed	66.49%	Ramdas Gangaram Kadam	SS	52,881	57.10%	Jadhav Babaji Gopal	NCP	27,460	29.65%	25,421
Raigad District
11	Dapoli	66.73%	Dalvi Suryakant Shivram	SS	48,219	49.52%	Mokal Chandrakant Jagannath	INC	24,385	25.04%	23,834
12	Mahad	76.49%	Jagtap Manik Motiram	NCP	56,972	47.92%	Prabhakar Sundarrao More	SS	53,193	44.74%	3,779
13	Shrivardhan	70.58%	Sawant Shyam Tukaram	SS	52,998	42.92%	Antulay Mushtaq Ataullah	INC	45,873	37.15%	7,125
14	Mangaon	69.37%	Sunil Tatkare	NCP	69,865	55.80%	Anant Vasant Alias Bal Lokhande	SS	37,591	30.02%	32,274
15	Pen	72.57%	Ravisheth Patil	INC	56,841	38.66%	Bhai Mohan Mahadev Patil	PWPI	41,905	28.50%	14,936
16	Alibag	71.67%	Thakur Madhukar Shankar	INC	65,828	43.28%	Meenakshi Patil	PWPI	59,961	39.42%	5,867
17	Panvel	65.21%	Vivek Shankar Patil	PWPI	93,559	47.51%	Shyam Mhatre	INC	73,836	37.49%	19,723
18	Khalapur	69.45%	Devendra Vitthal Satam	SS	51,632	31.95%	Suresh Narayan Lad	NCP	48,662	30.11%	2,970
Mumbai City District
19	Colaba	42.20%	Annie Shekhar	INC	20,266	41.71%	Adv.Rahul Suresh Narwekar	SS	12,576	25.88%	7,690
20	Umarkhadi	39.80%	Bashir Moosa Patel	NCP	25,180	61.05%	Oza Sharda Sohanlal	SS	8,767	21.25%	16,413
21	Mumbadevi	42.70%	Raj K. Purohit	BJP	19,862	56.37%	Adv. Sushil D. Vyas	INC	14,006	39.75%	5,856
22	Khetwadi	44.12%	Ashok Arjunrao Alias Bhai Jagtap	INC	23,650	52.09%	Atul Shah	BJP	19,876	43.78%	3,774
23	Opera House	48.32%	Arvinda Nerkar	SS	24,968	56.54%	Kisan Jadhav	INC	17,948	40.65%	7,020
24	Malabar Hill	50.56%	Mangal Prabhat Lodha	BJP	41,365	50.27%	Raj Shroff	INC	38,052	46.24%	3,313
25	Chinchpokli	50.51%	Arun Gawli	ABS	31,964	51.24%	Anna Alias Madhu Chavan	INC	20,146	32.29%	11,818
26	Nagpada	44.06%	Dr. Syed Ahmed (politician)	INC	20,869	45.02%	Yashwant Jadhav	SS	17,095	36.88%	3,774
27	Mazgaon	55.85%	Bala Nandgaonkar	SS	27,684	42.91%	Pankaj Bhujbal	NCP	26,212	40.63%	1,472
28	Parel	55.98%	Dagdu Haribhau Sakpal	SS	50,646	66.36%	Ghandat Sandeep Sitaram	INC	20,967	27.47%	29,679
29	Shivadi	53.71%	Sachin Mohan Ahir	NCP	43,816	55.61%	Sunil Rane	BJP	27,225	34.55%	16,591
Mumbai Suburban District
30	Worli	52.80%	Nalawade Datta Shankar	SS	30,106	44.13%	Kudatarkar Vijay Bhau	NCP	21,012	30.80%	9,094
31	Naigaon	52.76%	Kolambkar Kalidas Nilkanth	SS	46,353	56.66%	Rupawate Premanand Dadasaheb	INC	24,495	29.94%	21,858
32	Dadar	58.72%	Sada Sarvankar	SS	42,390	57.12%	Bhosale Shahaji Alias Rajan	INC	29,341	39.54%	13,049
33	Matunga	45.97%	Jagannath Achanna Shetty	INC	48,266	43.48%	Babubhai Bhawanji	BJP	43,610	39.29%	4,656
34	Mahim	49.74%	Suresh Anant Gambhir	SS	35,585	48.84%	Ajit Pandurang Sawant	INC	33,581	46.09%	2,004
35	Dharavi	40.08%	Varsha Eknath Gaikwad	INC	64,981	52.78%	Jadhav Snehal Sudhir	SS	49,151	39.92%	15,830
36	Vandre	43.17%	Baba Siddique	INC	44,517	56.19%	Shaina Nana Chudasama	BJP	25,877	32.66%	18,640
37	Kherwadi	50.49%	Janardan Chandurkar	INC	50,157	50.04%	Prakash(Bala) Vasant Sawant	SS	43,609	43.51%	6,548
38	Vile Parle	50.69%	Ashok Bhau Jadhav	INC	56,436	49.56%	Vinayak Bhaurao Raut	SS	47,453	41.67%	8,983
39	Amboli	44.70%	Baldev Khosa	INC	82,153	47.51%	Jaywant Mahadeo Parab	SS	72,206	41.76%	9,947
40	Santacruz	53.60%	Kripashankar Singh	INC	78,263	55.05%	Alavani Parag Madhusudan	BJP	56,074	39.44%	22,189
41	Andheri	52.78%	Suresh Shetty	INC	96,514	47.98%	Ravindra Dattaram Waikar	SS	87,445	43.47%	9,069
42	Goregaon	51.54%	Subhash Desai	SS	66,050	50.04%	Sharad Rao	NCP	56,911	43.11%	9,139
43	Malad	50.24%	Gajanan Kirtikar	SS	143,082	48.51%	Nirmala Samant Prabhavalkar	INC	129,292	43.83%	13,790
44	Kandivali	44.33%	P. U. Mehta	INC	107,851	48.73%	Jai Prakash Thakur	BJP	93,731	42.35%	14,120
45	Borivali	48.41%	Gopal Shetty	BJP	1,52,748	52.63%	Shashee Prabhu	INC	1,00,475	34.62%	52,273
46	Trombay	44.95%	Abrahani Yusuf Mohamed Hussain	INC	115,823	52.69%	Rahul Shewale	SS	72,095	32.80%	43,728
47	Chembur	50.33%	Chandrakant Handore	INC	46,196	39.43%	Pramod Shirwalkar	BJP	43,746	37.33%	2,450
48	Nehrunagar	51.35%	Nawab Malik	NCP	67,115	57.21%	Suryakant Mahadik	SS	36,854	31.42%	30,261
49	Kurla	43.35%	Mohammed Arif Naseem Khan	INC	119,612	55.36%	Dattaram Gujar	SS	77,119	35.69%	42,493
50	Ghatkopar	51.19%	Prakash Mehta	BJP	73,548	65.51%	Maheshbhai Bhanushali	INC	33,859	30.16%	39,689
51	Bhandup	53.00%	Sanjay Dina Patil	NCP	79,440	44.90%	Liladhar Dake	SS	73,760	41.69%	5,680
52	Mulund	48.18%	Sardar Tara Singh	BJP	90,882	53.33%	Alka Anant Desai	INC	70,124	41.15%	20,758
Thane District
53	Thane	52.73%	Eknath Shinde	SS	131,159	56.14%	Manoj Tukaram Shinde	INC	93,981	40.22%	37,178
54	Belapur	46.08%	Ganesh Naik	NCP	3,24,706	55.08%	Bhoir Sitaram Hendar	SS	2,06,430	35.02%	1,18,276
55	Ulhasnagar	37.50%	Kumar Uttamchand Ailani	BJP	55,397	37.88%	Karotiya Radhacharan Ramkisan	BSP	6,615	4.52%	48,782
56	Ambernath	46.09%	Kisan Kathore	NCP	114,675	45.60%	Sabir Shaikh	SS	106,582	42.38%	8,093
57	Kalyan	38.06%	Harishchandra Patil	BJP	110,752	51.26%	Alka Avalaskar	INC	92,491	42.80%	18,261
58	Murbad	73.43%	Gotiram Padu Pawar	NCP	63,763	44.48%	Salvi Rajaram Rama	BJP	46,698	32.58%	17,065
59	Wada	51.41%	Vishnu Rama Savar	BJP	77,351	47.15%	Suresh Haribhau Pawar	NCP	43,261	26.37%	34,090
60	Bhiwandi	54.51%	Yogesh Ramesh Patil	SS	1,18,561	45.19%	Abu Asim Azmi	SP	78,467	29.91%	40,094
61	Vasai	56.77%	Hitendra Vishnu Thakur	Independent	161,718	60.40%	Pandit Vivek Raghunath	SS	93,801	35.04%	67,917
62	Palghar	58.27%	Manisha Manohar Nimkar	SS	58,627	47.37%	Rajendra Dhedya Gavit	INC	50,186	40.55%	8,441
63	Dahanu	54.87%	Krushna Ghoda	NCP	72,715	49.82%	Ishwar Kisan Dhodi	SS	47,843	32.78%	24,872
64	Jawhar	60.07%	Ozare Rajaram Nathu	CPI(M)	60,050	42.19%	Bhoye Harishchandra Sakharam	BJP	36,819	25.87%	23,231
65	Shahapur	68.50%	Mahadu Nago Barora	NCP	47,895	39.30%	Daulat Bhika Daroda	SS	41,534	34.08%	6,361
Nashik District
66	Igatpuri	56.46%	Mengal Kashinath Dagdu	SS	37,233	36.44%	Damse Vasant Madhavrao	INC	29,985	29.34%	7,248
67	Nashik	42.94%	Bachhav Shobha Dinesh	INC	85,786	45.38%	Dr. Daulatrao Aher Sonuji	BJP	79,625	42.12%	6,161
68	Deolali	45.44%	Babanrao Gholap	SS	85,297	48.94%	Sadaphule Ramdas Dayaram (Baba)	NCP	79,695	45.72%	5,602
69	Sinnar	71.98%	Manikrao Shivajirao Kokate	SS	67,722	50.03%	Tukaram Sakharam Dighole	NCP	47,708	35.24%	20,014
70	Niphad	71.23%	Diliprao Shankarrao Bankar	NCP	82,706	53.61%	Kadam Mandakini Raosaheb	SS	35,409	22.95%	47,297
71	Yevla	66.60%	Chhagan Bhujbal	NCP	79,306	54.84%	Patil Kalyanrao Jayawantrao	SS	43,657	30.19%	35,649
72	Nandgaon	65.16%	Pawar Sanjay Sayaji	SS	50,783	37.23%	Aher Anilkumar Gangadhar	INC	43,359	31.79%	7,424
73	Malegaon	66.25%	Shaikh Rashid Haji Shaikh Shaffi	INC	80,579	49.85%	Gaikwad Sunil (Aaba) Babulal	BJP	10,398	6.43%	70,181
74	Dabhadi	71.56%	Dadaji Bhuse	Independent	68,079	45.01%	Hiray Prashant Vyankatrao	NCP	59,062	39.05%	9,017
75	Chandwad	70.63%	Uttam Ganpat Bhalerao	NCP	50,953	38.48%	Shirishkumar Vasantrao Kotwal	SS	42,485	32.08%	8,468
76	Dindori	61.93%	Narhari Sitaram Zirwal	NCP	61,205	43.08%	Ramdas Kisanrao Charoskar	Independent	31,606	22.25%	29,599
77	Surgana	74.40%	Jiva Pandu Gavit	CPI(M)	73,370	53.45%	Gavit Bhaskar Gopal	SS	58,749	42.80%	14,621
78	Kalwan	63.48%	Arjun Tulshiram Pawar	NCP	74,938	59.39%	Gangurde Dhanraj Krishna	BJP	45,514	36.07%	29,424
79	Baglan	52.88%	Chavan Sanjay Kantilal	Independent	37,155	34.80%	Umaji Manglu Borse	BJP	35,714	33.45%	1,441
80	Sakri	58.79%	Dhanaji Sitaram Ahire	INC	62,823	46.94%	Chaudhari Govindrao Shivram	BJP	47,561	35.54%	15,262
Nandurbar District
81	Navapur	75.79%	Surupsingh Hirya Naik	INC	1,21,613	73.55%	Bagul Anil Sukram	BJP	23,179	14.02%	98,434
82	Nandurbar	66.92%	Dr.Vijaykumar Krishnarao Gavit	NCP	72,132	52.04%	Gaikwad Namdevrao Ghamaji	SS	33,534	24.19%	38,598
83	Talode	69.21%	Padmakar Vijaysing Valvi	INC	57,397	44.93%	Dr. Padvi Narendrasing Bhagatsing	BJP	50,595	39.61%	6,802
Dhule District
84	Akrani	61.42%	Kagda Chandya Padvi	INC	38,165	33.85%	Padvi Udesing Kocharu	SS	20,225	17.94%	17,940
85	Shahada	72.96%	Jayakumar Jitendrasinh Rawal	BJP	55,674	36.37%	Dr. Deshmukh Hemant Bhaskar	NCP	43,314	28.30%	12,360
86	Shirpur	65.87%	Amrishbhai Rasiklal Patel	INC	104,535	66.09%	Chaudhari Baban Rawaji	BJP	44,279	28.00%	60,256
87	Sindkheda	66.12%	Annasaheb D. V. Patil	Independent	34,495	29.37%	Patil Ramkrushna Dodha	SS	28,823	24.54%	5,672
88	Kusumba	70.49%	Rohidas Chudaman Patil	INC	80,419	55.26%	Prof.Patil Sharad Madhavrao	SS	41,122	28.26%	39,297
Jalgaon District
89	Dhule	53.40%	Kadambande Rajwardhan Raghojirao Alias Raju Baba	NCP	54,457	39.26%	DR. SUBHASH RAMRAO BHAMRE	SS	49,114	35.41%	5,343
90	Chalisgaon	57.07%	Ghode Sahebrao Sitaram	BJP	44,915	33.74%	Jadhav Ananda Pundlik	NCP	35,362	26.56%	9,553
91	Parola	69.20%	Dr. Satish Bhaskarrao Patil	NCP	65,346	41.88%	Patil Chimanrao Rupchand	SS	65,199	41.78%	147
92	Amalner	63.72%	Dr. Abasaheb B S Patil	BJP	51,103	41.29%	Adv. Lalita Sham Patil	INC	50,371	40.70%	732
93	Chopda	77.28%	Patil Kailas Gorakh	SS	72,715	52.42%	Arunlal Gowardhandas Gujrathi	NCP	57,209	41.24%	15,506
94	Erandol	70.53%	Gulab Raghunath Patil	SS	68,767	48.49%	Patil Mahendrasinh Dharamsinh	INC	57,429	40.50%	11,338
95	Jalgaon	55.01%	Sureshkumar Bhikamchand Jain	NCP	73,987	47.90%	Prof. Sonawane Chandrakant Baliram	SS	68,099	44.09%	5,888
96	Pachora	69.34%	Tatyasaheb R.O. Patil	SS	75,862	52.35%	Dilip Onkar Wagh	NCP	59,674	41.18%	16,188
97	Jamner	72.67%	Girish Dattatraya Mahajan	BJP	71,813	49.50%	Sanjay Bhaskarrao Garud	Independent	42,500	29.29%	29,313
98	Bhusawal	65.71%	Chaudhari Satoshbhau Chabildas	NCP	92,430	54.88%	Bhole Dilip Atmaram	SS	64,664	38.40%	27,766
99	Yawal	66.43%	Chaudhary Ramesh Vitthal	INC	51,148	45.95%	Jawale Haribhau Madhav	BJP	46,726	41.98%	4,422
100	Raver	70.71%	Arun Pandurang Patil	BJP	61,111	47.62%	D.K Mahajan	INC	50,180	39.10%	10,931
101	Edlabad	75.53%	Eknath Khadse	BJP	69,006	47.74%	Ravindra Pralhadrao Patil	NCP	67,157	46.46%	1,849
Buldhana District
102	Malkapur	73.05%	Chainsukh Madanlal Sancheti	BJP	48,719	35.88%	Dr. Arvind Vasudev Kolte	INC	45,898	33.80%	2,821
103	Buldhana	70.56%	Vijayraj Haribhau Shinde	SS	55,546	33.89%	More Muktayarsingh Julalsingh	INC	40,908	24.96%	14,638
104	Chikhali	72.81%	Dr. Rajendra Bhaskarrao Shingane	NCP	71,527	45.54%	Rekha Purushottam Khedekar	BJP	68,969	43.91%	2,558
105	Sindkhed Raja	74.63%	Dr. Rajendra Bhaskarrao Shingane	NCP	71,527	45.83%	Dr. Khedekar Shashikant Narsngrao	SS	57,918	37.11%	13,609
106	Mehkar	74.36%	Prataprao Jadhav	SS	80,277	54.02%	Bhagwat Mhataraji Magar	Independent	35,456	23.86%	44,821
107	Khamgaon	74.76%	Dilip Kumar Gokulchand Sananda	INC	68,034	39.34%	Dhondiram Sonaji Khandare	BJP	51,995	30.06%	16,039
108	Jalamb	73.17%	Dr. Sanjay Kute	BJP	50,267	35.09%	Krushnarao Ganpatrao Ingle	INC	43,466	30.34%	6,801
Akola District
109	Akot	73.06%	Gulabrao Ramraoji Gawande	SS	52,000	36.35%	Hidayatullah Barkatullah Patel	Independent	31,889	22.29%	20,111
110	Borgaon Manju	59.43%	Bhade Haridas Pandhari	BBM	44,140	26.93%	Malokar Vijay Onkarrao	Independent	39,341	24.00%	4,799
111	Akole	57.70%	Govardhan Mangilal Sharma	BJP	48,073	36.55%	Khetan Ramakant Umashankar	INC	40,545	30.83%	7,528
112	Balapur	65.07%	Gavhankar Narayanrao Haribhau	BJP	52,157	40.71%	Sy. Mohsin Bhai	BBM	44,889	35.04%	7,268
Washim District
113	Medshi	67.96%	Jadhao Vijay Tulshiram	BJP	38,525	32.79%	Dr. Ingole Arun Gyanuji	Independent	37,997	32.34%	528
114	Washim	58.66%	Suresh Bhivaji Ingle	INC	42,131	37.12%	Motiram Saudagar Tupsande	BJP	32,859	28.95%	9,272
115	Mangrulpir	70.47%	Subhash Pandharinath Thakre	NCP	45,175	31.25%	Surve Bhimrao Namdeo	SS	36,806	25.46%	8,369
116	Murtizapur	63.89%	Tukaram Bidkar	NCP	47,580	40.09%	Kambe Raosaheb Dattuji	BJP	35,633	30.02%	11,947
117	Karanja	67.20%	Rajendra Sukhanand Patni	SS	36,695	30.01%	Prakash Uttamrao Dahake	BBM	36,648	29.98%	47
Amravati District
118	Daryapur	69.64%	Prakash Gunvantrao Bharsakale	SS	53,329	42.23%	Arun Tryamba Krao Gawande	Independent	29,029	22.98%	24,300
119	Melghat	61.65%	Rajkumar Dayaram Patel	BJP	61,354	45.98%	Patel Ramu Mhatang	INC	57,582	43.15%	3,772
120	Achalpur	73.05%	Bachchu Kadu	Independent	56,471	38.24%	Vasudhatai Pundlikrao Deshmukh	INC	51,085	34.59%	5,386
121	Morshi	72.30%	Harshwardhan Pratapsinha Deshmukh	JSS	36,524	27.66%	Dr. Anil Sukhdeorao Bonde	SS	35,143	26.62%	1,381
122	Teosa	66.90%	Sahebrao Ramchandra Tatte	BJP	38,894	34.29%	Yashomati Bhayyasaheb Thakur	INC	31,956	28.17%	6,938
123	Walgaon	67.46%	Band Sanjay Raosaheb	SS	41,109	37.53%	Warhade Sunil Gopalrao	INC	28,346	25.88%	12,763
124	Amravati	55.48%	Dr. Sunil Panjabrao Deshmukh	INC	81,698	55.05%	Jagdish Gupta	BJP	49,435	33.31%	32,263
125	Badnera	62.52%	Sulbha Sanjay Khodke	NCP	54,995	36.88%	Dyaneshwar Dhane Patil	SS	49,236	33.02%	5,759
126	Chandur	70.59%	Virendra Walmikrao Jagtap	INC	45,536	39.81%	Pratap Arunbhau Adsad	BJP	32,233	28.18%	13,303
Wardha District
127	Arvi	70.46%	Amar Sharadrao Kale	INC	70,938	51.03%	Dadarao Keche	BJP	45,861	32.99%	25,077
128	Pulgaon	65.12%	Ranjit Prataprao Kamble	INC	58,836	42.46%	Shende Pramod Bhusaheb	INC	53,963	38.94%	4,873
129	Wardha	62.06%	Pramod Bhauraoji Shende	INC	53,963	42.51%	Shyam Gaikwad	Independent	34,731	27.36%	19,232
130	Hinganghat	69.39%	Timande Raju Alias Mohan Wasudeorao	NCP	82,630	52.08%	Ashok Shamrao Shinde	SS	56,258	35.46%	26,372
131	Umred	73.71%	Rajendra Mulak	INC	66,539	47.94%	Vitthalrao Jagobaji Raut Patil	BJP	41,573	29.95%	24,966
Nagpur District
132	Kamthi	66.04%	Chandrashekhar Bawankule	BJP	56,128	34.86%	Sulekha Narayan Kumbhare	RPI	48,734	30.27%	7,394
133	Nagpur North	45.99%	Dr. Nitin Kashinath Raut	INC	70,758	50.26%	Shamkule Nanaji Sitaram	BJP	33,556	23.83%	37,202
134	Nagpur East	53.87%	Satish Jhaulal Chaturvedi	INC	96,246	46.47%	Shekhar Jayram Sawarbandhe	SS	84,415	40.76%	11,831
135	Nagpur South	52.95%	Govindrao Marotrao Wanjari	INC	44,551	36.21%	Mohan Gopalrao Mate	BJP	35,537	28.88%	9,014
136	Nagpur Central	56.73%	Anees Ahmed	INC	39,684	49.86%	Dayashankar Chandrashekhar Tiwari	BJP	28,401	35.69%	11,283
137	Nagpur West	52.30%	Devendra Fadnavis	BJP	113,143	48.59%	Deshmukh Ranjeetbabu Arvindbabu	INC	95,533	41.02%	17,610
138	Kalmeshwar	69.56%	Bang Rameshchandra Gopikisan	NCP	48,643	31.17%	Gawande Sunita Ramesh	Independent	45,579	29.21%	3,064
139	Katol	71.73%	Anil Vasantrao Deshmukh	NCP	75,173	64.56%	Shinde Satish Sunil	SS	30,324	26.04%	44,849
140	Savner	74.55%	Sunil Chhatrapal Kedar	Independent	61,863	41.30%	Asole Deorao Vitthalrao	BJP	48,396	32.31%	13,467
141	Ramtek	70.09%	Ashish Nandkishor Jaiswal	SS	41,115	27.79%	Kimmatkar Madhukar Ghanshyamrao	Independent	27,539	18.62%	13,576
Bhandara District
142	Tumsar	75.80%	Madhukar Yashwantrao Kukde	BJP	29,725	25.36%	Anil Bawankar	Independent	25,524	21.77%	4,201
143	Bhandara	73.46%	Panchabudhe Nana Jairam	NCP	43,269	32.78%	Aswale Ram Gopal	BJP	42,158	31.94%	1,111
144	Adyar	75.73%	Sawarbandhe Bhuishchandra Alies Bandubhau Harishchandra	INC	43,627	33.11%	Dahare Naresh Keshaorao	SS	37,860	28.73%	5,767
Gondia District
145	Tirora	69.54%	Dilip Waman Bansod	NCP	49,271	45.90%	Vaidya Bhajandas Vithoba	BJP	32,202	30.00%	17,069
146	Gondiya	68.61%	Gopaldas Shankarlal Agrawal	INC	51,453	41.19%	Kuthe Rameshkumar Sampatrao	SS	45,932	36.77%	5,521
147	Goregaon	76.02%	Patle Hemant (Tanubhau) Shrawan	BJP	51,209	44.63%	Baghele Dr. Zamsinghbhau Fagalalbhau	INC	48,435	42.22%	2,774
148	Amgaon	77.30%	Nagpure Bhersinh Dukluji	BJP	48,760	31.94%	Nareshkumar Amritlal Maheshwari	NCP	48,167	31.55%	593
149	Sakoli	76.82%	Sewakbhau Nirdhanji Waghaye	INC	57,293	42.77%	Girhepunje Shiwram Sonabaji	BJP	43,173	32.23%	14,120
150	Lakhandur	81.60%	Patole Nanabhau Falgunrao	INC	85,593	53.87%	Kapgate Dayaram Maroti	BJP	43,833	27.59%	41,760
Gadchiroli District
151	Armori	73.90%	Anandrao Gangaram Gedam	INC	53,567	37.83%	Madavi Ramkrushna Hariji	SS	40,841	28.84%	12,726
152	Gadchiroli	72.11%	Ashok Nete	BJP	60,516	42.12%	Poreti Tulshiram Raoji	INC	50,823	35.37%	9,693
153	Sironcha	72.48%	Dharamraobaba Bhagwantrao Atram	NCP	42,198	30.61%	Atram Dipak Dada	BSP	34,831	25.26%	7,367
154	Rajura	73.34%	Wamanrao Sadashivrao Chatap	SBP	66,216	37.66%	Nimkar Sudarshan Bhagwanrao	INC	57,155	32.51%	9,061
Chandrapur District
155	Chandrapur	61.93%	Sudhir Sachchidanand Mungantiwar	BJP	94,003	49.99%	Gawande ( Guruji ) Gajanan Balaji	INC	67,102	35.69%	26,901
156	Saoli	66.43%	Shobha Fadnavis	BJP	48,004	31.99%	Deorao Bhayyaji Bhandekar	INC	43,094	28.72%	4,910
157	Bramhapuri	72.26%	Atul Devidas Deshkar	BJP	52,953	36.78%	Misar Damodhar Shravan	NCP	38,777	26.94%	14,176
158	Chimur	74.49%	Vijay Namdevrao Wadettiwar	SS	45,332	30.98%	Dr. Avinash Manoharrao Warjukar	INC	44,529	30.43%	803
159	Bhadrawati	65.54%	Sanjay Wamanrao Deotale	INC	48,422	34.10%	Dr. Anil Laxmanrao Bujone	Independent	29,979	21.11%	18,443
160	Wani	73.10%	Vishwas Ramchandra Nandekar	SS	61,926	45.35%	Wamanrao Kasawar	INC	47,860	35.05%	14,066
161	Ralegaon	72.64%	Prof. Vasantrao Chindhuji Purke	INC	64,686	45.92%	Ashok Ramaji Uike	SS	53,468	37.96%	11,218
Yavatmal District
162	Kelapur	70.67%	Sandip Prabhakar Dhurve	BJP	50,427	40.27%	Moghe Shivajirao Shivaramji	INC	45,897	36.65%	4,530
163	Yavatmal	56.96%	Madan Madhukar Yerawar	BJP	49,234	35.76%	Kirti Gandhi	INC	42,875	31.14%	6,359
164	Darwha	75.57%	Sanjay Rathod	SS	68,586	48.94%	Manikrao Govindrao Thakare	INC	47,044	33.57%	21,542
165	Digras	75.54%	Sanjay Uttamrao Deshmukh	Independent	42,991	28.22%	Shreekant Alias Balasaheb Munginwar	SS	40,473	26.56%	2,518
166	Pusad	71.01%	Manohar Rajusing Naik	NCP	92,647	57.76%	Phupate Aarti Haribhau	SS	51,226	31.94%	41,421
167	Umarkhed	70.13%	Ingle Uttam Raghoji	BJP	52,143	35.24%	Adv.Devsarkar Anantrao Apparao	INC	37,234	25.17%	14,909
Nanded District
168	Kinwat	76.42%	Pradeep Hemsingh Jadhav	NCP	64,558	45.64%	Keram Bhimrao Ramaji	Independent	36,042	25.48%	28,516
169	Hadgaon	73.88%	Subhash Bapurao Wankhede	SS	51,842	34.42%	Jawalgaonkar Madhavrao Nivruttirao Patil	INC	48,104	31.94%	3,738
170	Nanded	55.57%	Anusayatai Prakash Khedkar	SS	84,610	38.99%	Omprakash Ganeshlal Pokrna	INC	63,835	29.42%	20,775
171	Mudkhed	73.31%	Ashokrao Shankarrao Chavan	INC	1,05,932	62.15%	Kunturker Gangadharrao Mohanrao	Independent	35,478	20.81%	70,454
172	Bhokar	74.34%	Bapusaheb Gorthekar	NCP	51,694	36.61%	Ghisewad Naganath Lakshman	SS	44,992	31.86%	6,702
173	Biloli	67.71%	Abhiyanta Bhaskarrao Patil Khatgaonkar	INC	59,639	36.67%	Kasralikar Thakkarwad Gangaram Poshetty	BJP	51,421	31.62%	8,218
174	Mukhed	66.76%	Subhash Piraji Sabne	SS	63,525	42.67%	Avinash Madhukarrao Ghate	INC	58,172	39.07%	5,353
Parbhani District
175	Kandhar	74.70%	Chikhlikar Prataprao Govindrao	Independent	49,191	30.85%	Shankar Anna Dhondge	NCP	43,218	27.11%	5,973
176	Gangakhed	66.13%	Gaikwad Vitthal Purbhaji	BJP	43,065	34.21%	Ghandant Sitaram Chimaji	Independent	33,764	26.82%	9,301
177	Singnapur	72.36%	Suresh Ambadasrao Warpudkar	Independent	45,561	35.75%	Ambegaonkar Manikrao Sopanrao (Jadhav)	SS	26,158	20.52%	19,403
Hingoli District
178	Parbhani	61.57%	Sanjay Haribhau Jadhav	SS	74,939	47.20%	Ashok Anandrao Deshmukh	INC	65,192	41.06%	9,747
179	Basmath	78.51%	Jayprakash R. Salunke Dandegaonkar	NCP	80,935	46.47%	Dr. Jayprakash Shankarlal Mundada	SS	80,627	46.29%	308
180	Kalamnuri	68.63%	Ghuge Gajanan Vitthalrao	SS	72,221	49.86%	Ramrao Sakharam Wadkute	NCP	48,248	33.31%	23,973
181	Hingoli	69.07%	Patil Bhaurao Baburao	INC	48,646	31.86%	Patil Sahebrao Narayanrao	BSP	32,649	21.38%	15,997
Jalna District
182	Jintur	72.44%	Ramprasad Kadam Bordikar	Independent	65,451	44.99%	Kundlikrao Bhagwanrao Nagre	INC	29,458	20.25%	35,993
183	Pathri	72.26%	Abdullah "Babajani" Khan Durrani	NCP	49,801	38.24%	Haribhau Vitthalrao Lahane	SS	43,331	33.27%	6,470
184	Partur	67.70%	Babanrao Dattatray Yadav	BJP	41,515	30.43%	Gopalrao Govindrao Borade	INC	28,110	20.61%	13,405
185	Ambad	78.03%	Rajeshbhaiyya Tope	NCP	76,816	46.29%	Vilasbapu Vithalrao Kharat	Independent	40,127	24.18%	36,689
186	Jalna	63.57%	Arjun Khotkar	SS	86,696	51.50%	Kailas Kisanrao Gorantyal	INC	70,022	41.59%	16,674
187	Badnapur	72.78%	Arvind Bajirao Chavan	NCP	56,539	38.06%	Ghuge Bhanudas Ambuji	SS	48,910	32.92%	7,629
188	Bhokardan	72.80%	Chandrakant Danve	NCP	73,611	45.48%	Thote Shivajirao Dhondiba	BJP	70,472	43.54%	3,139
Aurangabad District
189	Sillod	74.37%	Lokhande Sandu Ananada	BJP	54,290	37.45%	Abdul Sattar Abdul Nabi	INC	53,989	37.24%	301
190	Kannad	73.41%	Namdev Ramrao Pawar	SS	35,951	21.14%	Patil Nitin Suresh	INC	35,251	20.73%	700
191	Vaijapur	73.24%	Rangnath Murlidhar Wani	SS	41,365	30.46%	Bhausaheb Ramrao Chikatgaonkar	Independent	32,413	23.87%	8,952
192	Gangapur	62.89%	Annasaheb Mane Patil	SS	50,985	32.11%	Chavan Vilas Dadarao	NCP	46,342	29.19%	4,643
193	Aurangabad West	59.80%	Rajendra Darda	INC	1,54,056	45.86%	Jaiswal Pradeep	SS	1,46,170	43.51%	7,886
194	Aurangabad East	68.32%	Dr. Kalyan Kale	INC	97,278	48.20%	Haribhau Bagade	BJP	88,168	43.69%	9,110
195	Paithan	70.82%	Sandipanrao Asaram Bhumare	SS	48,462	39.68%	Shinde Sunil Shivaji	Independent	43,336	35.48%	5,126
Beed District
196	Georai	80.22%	Amarsinh Pandit	BJP	80,414	50.82%	Badamrao Pandit	NCP	63,814	40.33%	16,600
197	Majalgaon	72.03%	Prakashdada Solanke	BJP	71,937	41.92%	Jagtap Bajirao Sonaji	NCP	36,907	21.51%	35,030
198	Beed	71.35%	Dhande Sunil Suryabhan	SS	86,581	49.52%	Syed Salim Ali Syed Ali	NCP	71,308	40.79%	15,273
199	Ashti	77.35%	Suresh Dhas	BJP	92,706	52.07%	Dhonde Bhimrao Anandrao	Independent	41,085	23.08%	51,621
200	Chausala	77.29%	Andhale Keshavrao Yadavrao	BJP	78,439	47.81%	Jaydattaji Kshirsagar	NCP	75,062	45.75%	3,377
201	Kaij	70.97%	Dr. Vimal Mundada	NCP	86,720	54.73%	Chandrashekhar Vishnupant Wadmare	BJP	59,380	37.48%	27,340
202	Renapur	73.72%	Gopinath Pandurang Munde	BJP	92,745	56.56%	Fulchand Yedba Karad	NCP	54,312	33.12%	38,433
Latur District
203	Ahmedpur	74.63%	Khandade Babruwan Ramkrishna	BJP	48,406	33.15%	Kalegaonkar Vinayakrao Patil	INC	43,720	29.94%	4,686
204	Udgir	71.02%	Bhosale Chandrashekhar Dhoniba	NCP	57,605	36.84%	Kendre Govind Dnyanoba	BJP	54,488	34.85%	3,117
205	Her	69.15%	Kamble Trimbak Pandurang	BJP	45,058	39.21%	Prof.Ramkishan Bhimrao Sonkamble	INC	43,588	37.93%	1,470
206	Latur	67.48%	Vilasrao Dagadojirao Deshmukh	INC	1,47,033	61.50%	Shivajirao Patil Kavhekar	BJP	70,000	29.28%	77,033
207	Kalamb	66.50%	Dayanand Bhimrao Gaikwad	SS	38,255	31.72%	Kamble Shivaji Vitthal	INC	36,952	30.64%	1,303
Osmanabad District
208	Paranda	73.02%	Rahul Maharuda Mote	NCP	56,225	40.05%	Balasaheb Bhagwantrao Patil	RSPS	44,734	31.87%	11,491
209	Osmanabad	68.04%	Dr. Padamsinh Bajirao Patil	NCP	68,834	45.77%	Pawan Raje Bhopalsinh Santajirao Rajenimbalkar	Independent	68,350	45.45%	484
210	Ausa	66.64%	Mane Dinakar Baburao	SS	71,324	52.88%	Patil Shesherao Trimbakrao	INC	49,865	36.97%	21,459
211	Nilanga	71.90%	Sambhaji Patil Nilangekar	BJP	66,346	43.42%	Shivajirao Patil Nilangekar	INC	63,990	41.88%	2,356
212	Omerga	70.49%	Ravindra Gaikwad	SS	64,401	43.36%	Basavraj Madhavrao Patil	INC	61,848	41.64%	2,553
213	Tuljapur	71.27%	Madhukarao Deorao Chavan	INC	40,958	35.10%	Devanand Sahebrao Rochkari	SP	37,513	32.15%	3,445
Solapur District
214	Akkalkot	68.94%	Siddharam Satlingappa Mhetre	INC	62,701	52.20%	Patil Sidramappa Malakappa	BJP	50,207	41.80%	12,494
215	Solapur South	65.19%	Sushilkumar Shinde	INC	62,196	51.90%	Uday Ramesh Patil	Independent	32,344	26.99%	29,852
216	Solapur City South	56.19%	Adam Narsayya Narayan	CPI(M)	32,552	30.63%	Shivsharan Hanmantappa Birajdar-Patil	SS	27,361	25.74%	5,191
217	Solapur City North	58.79%	Vijay Siddramappa Deshmukh	BJP	32,665	51.11%	Chakote Vishwanath Baburao	INC	25,392	39.73%	7,273
218	North Sholapur	43.49%	Khandare Uttamprakash Baburao	SS	78,252	46.81%	Laxman Bapurao Mane	NCP	55,986	33.49%	22,266
219	Mangalwedha	58.63%	Sale Ramchandra Dnyanoba	NCP	47,251	40.04%	Gopal Sambhu Shivsharan	SS	32,303	27.37%	14,948
220	Mohol	76.40%	Patil Rajan Baburao	NCP	80,128	59.84%	Nimbalkar Chandrakant Dattaji	SS	48,903	36.52%	31,225
221	Barshi	79.57%	Rajendra Raut	SS	73,401	50.39%	Dilip Gangadhar Sopal	NCP	68,181	46.81%	5,220
222	Madha	76.32%	Babanrao Vitthalrao Shinde	NCP	92,851	61.13%	Sawant Shivaji Jaywant	SS	50,106	32.99%	42,745
223	Pandharpur	79.73%	Sudhakar Ramchandra Paricharak	NCP	84,554	42.11%	Pandurang Patil Yashwantrao	Independent	60,415	30.08%	24,139
224	Sangola	78.28%	Ganpatrao Abasaheb Deshmukh	PWPI	1,00,000	52.64%	Shahajibapu Rajaram Patil	INC	79,404	41.80%	20,596
225	Malshiras	78.27%	Vijaysinh Mohite–Patil	NCP	132,543	69.92%	Deshmukh Ramdas Abasaheb	BSP	27,831	14.68%	104,712
226	Karmala	79.77%	Jaywantrao Namdeorao Jagtap	SS	62,692	49.23%	Bagal Digambar Murlidhar	NCP	59,052	46.37%	3,640
227	Karjat	59.66%	Sadashiv Kisan Lokhande	BJP	56,524	47.76%	Arvind Shahurao Kalookhe	INC	50,051	42.29%	6,473
228	Shrigonda	72.80%	Pachpute Babanrao Bhikaji	Independent	61,573	37.10%	Nagwade Shivajirao Narayan	INC	42,288	25.48%	19,285
Ahmednagar District
229	Ahmednagar South	56.25%	Anil Rathod	SS	78,192	58.32%	Kalamkar Dadabhau Dasarth Rao	NCP	52,742	39.34%	25,450
230	Ahmednagar North	68.26%	Shivaji Bhanudas Kardile	NCP	76,436	42.49%	Shelke Maruti Deoram	Independent	44,591	24.79%	31,845
231	Pathardi	73.74%	Rajeev Rajale	INC	66,846	44.27%	Dhakane Partap Babanrao	BJP	60,845	40.30%	6,001
232	Shegaon	71.54%	Ghule Narendra Marutraoji	NCP	69,566	48.08%	Langhe Vitthal Vakilrao	BJP	68,764	47.52%	802
233	Shrirampur	74.22%	Jayant Murlidhar Sasane	INC	61,521	49.71%	Murkute Bhanudas Kashinath	SS	54,358	43.92%	7,163
234	Shirdi	69.04%	Radhakrishna Vikhe Patil	INC	95,204	79.71%	Gadekar Dhanjay Shravan	SS	24,237	20.29%	70,967
235	Kopargaon	81.15%	Ashokrao Shankarrao Kale	SS	77,326	53.55%	Kolhe Bipin Shankarrao	NCP	61,012	42.26%	16,314
236	Rahuri	74.78%	Kadam Chandrashekar Laxmanrao	BJP	70,751	51.32%	Prasadrao Baburao Tanpure	NCP	61,020	44.26%	9,731
237	Parner	69.46%	Vijayrao Bhaskarrao Auti	SS	59,528	50.01%	Patil Vansantrao Kishanrao	NCP	50,391	42.34%	9,137
238	Sangamner	72.62%	Vijay Bhausaheb Thorat	INC	1,20,058	71.04%	Sambhajirao Ramchandra Thorat	SS	44,301	26.21%	75,757
239	Nagar–Akola	70.54%	Madhukar Pichad	NCP	73,405	47.97%	Ashok Yashwant Bhangare	SS	68,485	44.76%	4,920
Pune District
240	Junnar	71.27%	Vallabh Benke	NCP	73,855	50.00%	Janardan Alias Balasaheb Sawlerambuwa Dangat	SS	59,724	40.43%	14,131
241	Ambegaon	74.94%	Dilip Walse Patil	NCP	81,830	64.02%	Adv. Avinash Tukaram Rahane	SS	42,194	33.01%	39,636
242	Khed Alandi	62.84%	Dilip Dattatray Mohite	NCP	76,769	52.51%	Narayanrao Baburao Pawar	Independent	62,439	42.71%	14,330
243	Maval	66.48%	Bhegde Digambar Baloba	BJP	49,612	33.73%	Bafna Madanlal Harakchand	NCP	46,300	31.48%	3,312
244	Mulshi	49.00%	Dhamale Sharad Bajirao	SS	78,701	38.33%	Rajendra Tukaram Hagawane	NCP	61,594	30.00%	17,107
245	Haveli	39.26%	Vilas Vithoba Lande	NCP	149,057	47.12%	Gajanan Dharmshi Babar	SS	131,981	41.72%	17,076
246	Bopodi	43.19%	Adv. Chandrakant Chhajed	INC	47,534	45.47%	Aba Alias Prabhakar Sadashiv Nikam	BJP	34,524	33.03%	13,010
247	Shivajinagar	49.72%	Vinayak Mahadeo Nimhan	SS	114,713	57.91%	Anil Shivajirao Bhosale	NCP	76,532	38.64%	38,181
248	Parvati	43.81%	Bagve Ramesh Anandrao	INC	96,853	54.09%	Gangurde Vishwas Krishnarao	BJP	70,179	39.19%	26,674
249	Kasba Peth	54.84%	Girish Bapat	BJP	38,160	55.81%	Anna Thorat	NCP	28,542	41.74%	9,618
250	Bhavani Peth	48.12%	Kamal Ulhas Dhole Patil	NCP	39,861	44.50%	Deepak Natharam Paigude	SS	39,604	44.21%	257
251	Pune Cantonment	42.26%	Balasaheb Alias Chandrakant Shivarkar	INC	101,802	56.66%	Leelavati Vithal Tupe	SS	68,984	38.39%	32,818
252	Shirur	68.69%	Baburao Kashinath Pacharne	BJP	70,601	49.12%	Gawade Popatrao Hariba	NCP	61,041	42.46%	9,560
253	Daund	71.04%	Ranjana Subhashrao Kul	NCP	102,264	52.59%	Rameshappa Kisan Thorat	Independent	78,037	40.13%	24,227
254	Indapur	74.50%	Harshvardhan Shahajirao Patil	Independent	94,409	55.51%	Garatkar Pradeep Prabhakar	SS	69,836	41.06%	24,573
255	Baramati	66.67%	Ajit Pawar	NCP	96,302	69.07%	Popatrao Mansingrao Tupe	SS	30,145	21.62%	66,157
256	Purandar	65.40%	Ashok Kondiba Tekawade	NCP	63,011	41.49%	Dada Jadhavrao	JD(S)	49,551	32.60%	30,897
257	Bhor	68.84%	Anantrao Thopate	INC	61,536	55.15%	Dhumal Mansing Khanderao	SS	43,102	38.63%	18,434
258	Phaltan	67.67%	Ramraje Naik Nimbalkar	NCP	82,996	61.69%	Naik Nimbalkar Ranjatsinh Hindurao	SS	42,051	31.25%	40,945
259	Man	68.54%	Awaghade Sampatrao Ganapat	NCP	58,398	40.64%	Mane Baburao Jotiram	SS	39,095	27.20%	19,303
260	Khatav	71.52%	Dilip Muralidhar Yelgaonkar	BJP	76,435	55.72%	Gharge Prabhakar Devaba	Independent	30,744	22.41%	45,691
261	Koregaon	67.10%	Dr. Shalini Patil	NCP	61,326	51.29%	Mahadik Shivajirao Anandrao (Sir)	Independent	26,322	22.01%	35,004
Satara District
262	Wai	75.43%	Madanrao Prataprao Bhosale	Independent	68,660	53.69%	Makrand Laxmanrao Jadhav-Patil	NCP	50,395	39.41%	18,265
263	Jaoli	71.71%	Shinde Shashikant Jayawantrao	NCP	89,240	59.78%	Sapkal Sadashiv Pandurang	SS	45,701	30.61%	43,539
264	Satara	70.26%	Bhonsale Shrimant Shivendrasinh Abhayasinhraje	NCP	82,238	52.60%	Bhonsle Shrimant Chhatrapati Udayanraje Pratapsinh Maharaj	BJP	71,324	45.62%	10,914
265	Patan	81.13%	Shambhuraj Shivajirao Desai	SS	72,214	50.88%	Vikramsinh Ranjitsinh Patankar	NCP	66,363	46.75%	5,851
266	Karad North	70.03%	Shamrao Pandurang Patil	NCP	71,541	47.94%	Arun Sopanrao Jadhav	Independent	67,920	45.52%	3,621
267	Karad South	68.02%	Vilasrao Balkrishna Patil	INC	108,367	84.07%	Subhedar Kamlakar Gopal	SS	12,914	10.02%	95,453
268	Shirala	82.28%	Shivajirao Yashwantrao Naik	Independent	65,717	39.94%	Mansing Fattesingrao Naik	NCP	56,256	34.19%	9,461
269	Walva	75.15%	Jayant Rajaram Patil	NCP	120,830	74.43%	Raghunath Dada Patil	SBP	35,740	22.02%	85,090
270	Bhilwadi Wangi	75.41%	Dr. Patangrao Shripatrao Kadam	INC	121,941	77.60%	Dr. Prithviraj Sampatrao Chavan	Independent	20,041	12.75%	101,900
Sangli District
271	Sangli	70.79%	Madan Vishwanathrao Patil	Independent	66,563	45.55%	Sambhaji Pawar	BJP	39,796	27.23%	26,767
272	Miraj	64.31%	Dhatture Hafijabhai Husen	INC	45,181	32.17%	Patil Bajrang Tukaram	SS	33,766	24.05%	11,415
273	Tasgaon	79.98%	Raosaheb Ramrao Patil	NCP	70,483	50.36%	Sanjay Ramchandra Patil	Independent	64,179	45.86%	6,304
274	Khanapur Atpadi	72.97%	Sadashivrao Hanmantrao Patil	Independent	79,813	50.94%	Anilbhau Kaljerao Babar	NCP	54,726	34.93%	25,087
275	Kavathe Mahankal	73.21%	Ajitrao Shankarrao Ghorpade	INC	72,597	50.57%	Jaysingrao(Tatya) Dhondiram Shendage	Independent	58,501	40.75%	14,096
276	Jat	66.69%	Sureshbhau Dagadu Khade	BJP	63,059	46.11%	Sanamadikar Umaji Dhanappa	INC	37,610	27.50%	25,449
277	Shirol	73.92%	Raju Shetti	Independent	61,254	35.10%	Magdum Rajanitai Vishwanath	INC	42,507	24.36%	18,747
Kolhapur District
278	Ichalkaranji	69.24%	Prakashanna Awade	INC	1,07,846	58.89%	Pujari Shankarrao Ramchandra	Independent	34,672	18.93%	73,174
279	Vadgaon	71.43%	Awale Raju Kisan	JSS	67,489	42.99%	Avale Jayawant Gangaram	INC	56,356	35.90%	11,133
280	Shahuwadi	83.26%	Satyajeet (Aaba) Babasaheb Patil Sarudkar	SS	51,075	35.88%	Karnasinh Sanjaysinh Gaikwad (Bal)	INC	44,600	31.33%	6,475
281	Panhala	84.40%	Vinay Vilasrao Kore	JSS	66,256	48.94%	Patil Yeshwant Eknath	NCP	56,525	41.75%	9,731
282	Sangrul	84.91%	P. N. Patil (Sadolikar)	INC	99,439	60.21%	Sampatbapu Shamrao Pawarpatil	PWPI	54,442	32.97%	44,997
283	Radhanagari	78.93%	Krishnarao Patil	Independent	95,235	60.74%	Bajarang Anandrao Desai	INC	39,895	25.45%	55,340
284	Kolhapur	65.24%	Chhatrapati Malojiraje Shahu	INC	76,157	53.62%	Suresh Balwant Salokhe	SS	48,015	33.80%	28,142
285	Karvir	75.36%	Satej Patil	Independent	116,909	60.10%	Digvijay Bhausaheb Khanvilkar	NCP	74,305	38.20%	42,604
286	Kagal	88.64%	Hasan Miyalal Mushrif	NCP	79,533	49.04%	Ghatge Sanjay Anandrao	SS	78,408	48.34%	1,125
287	Gadhinglaj	75.99%	Desai Krishnarao Rakhamajirao	NCP	74,503	55.39%	Chavan Prakash Bhimrao	JSS	27,216	20.23%	47,287
288	Chandgad	82.02%	Narsingrao Gurunath Patil	JSS	47,738	32.48%	Bharamu Subarao Patil	SS	47,727	32.48%	11
