= Vijaysinh Pandit =

Indian politician

Vijaysinh Shivajirao Pandit
- विजयसिंह शिवाजीराव पंडित (हिंदु मराठा)
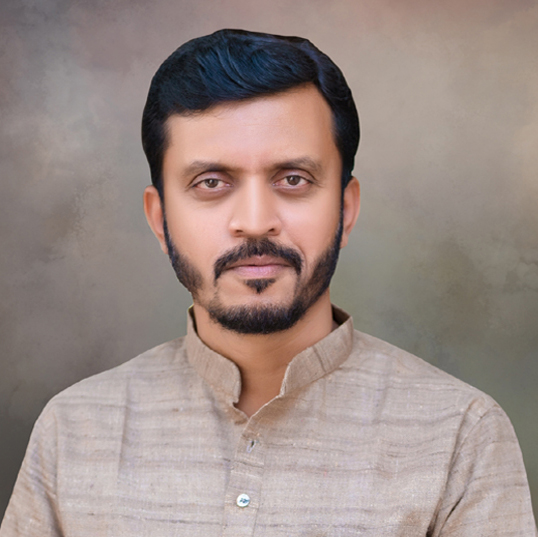
- Vijaysinh(Raje) Shivajirao Pandit

Member of Maharashtra Legislative Assembly
- Incumbent
- Assumed office 2024-Present
- Preceded by: Laxman Pawar
- Constituency: Georai

Personal details
- Born: 21 November 1977 (age 48) Daithan, Tq. Georai - Beed
- Party: Nationalist Congress Party
- Spouse: Sau. Vijeta Vijaysinh Pandit
- Relations: Amarsinh Pandit; Jaisinh Shivajirao Pandit
- Children: Viranjali Vijaysinh Pandit Rajwardhan Vijaysinh Pandit
- Occupation: Political & Social Activist
- Nickname: Vijayraje
- Vijaysinh Shivajirao Pandit

Vijaysinh Shivajirao Pandit (born 1977) is an Indian politician from Maharashtra. He is an MLA from Georai Assembly constituency in Beed district. He won the 2024 Maharashtra Legislative Assembly election representing the Nationalist Congress Party.

== Early life and education ==
Pandit is from Georai, Beed district, Maharashtra. He is the youngest of the three sons of former minister Shivajirao Ankushrao Pandit. He completed his L.L.B. in 2010 at Dr. Babasaheb Ambedkar Marathwada University, Aurangabad. He runs his own business. He is a former Zilla Parishad president.

== Career ==
Pandit won from Georai Assembly constituency representing Nationalist Congress Party in the 2024 Maharashtra Legislative Assembly election. He polled 116,141 votes and defeated his nearest rival and uncle, Badamrao Lahurao Pandit of Shiva Sena (UBT), by a margin of 42,390 votes. He contested the 2019 Maharashtra Legislative Assembly election on the NCP ticket but lost to Laxman Pawar of the Bharatiya Janata Party, by a margin of 6,792 votes. After the split in the party, he stayed with Ajit Pawar faction.
