= Kalyan Assembly constituency =

Former constituency of the Maharashtra legislative assembly in India

Coordinates: 19.241°N 73.133°E

Kalyan
- Former constituency for the Maharashtra Legislative Assembly

Constituency details
- Country: India
- Region: Western India
- State: Maharashtra
- Established: 1955
- Abolished: 2008
- Reservation: None

Kalyan Vidhan Sabha Seat no longer exists, after the redrawing of Assembly constituency borders in 2008. It was one of the 288 assembly seats in Maharashtra state in India. Since 2008, Kalyan has been split into three Assembly constituencies: Kalyan East, Kalyan West and Kalyan Rural.

== Members of the Legislative Assembly ==
Year	Member	Party
1957	Krishnarao Dhulap	Peasants and Workers Party
1962	Krishnarao Dhulap	Peasants and Workers Party
1967	Krishnarao Dhulap	Peasants and Workers Party
1972	Nakul Patil	Indian National Congress
1978	Ram Kapse	Janata Party
1980	Ram Kapse	Bharatiya Janata Party
1985	Ram Kapse	Bharatiya Janata Party
1990	Jagannath Patil	Bharatiya Janata Party
1995	Jagannath Patil	Bharatiya Janata Party
1999	Jagannath Patil	Bharatiya Janata Party
2004	Harishchandra Patil	Bharatiya Janata Party
2008 onwards : Constituency defunct

== Election results ==
=== Assembly Election 2004 ===
2004 Maharashtra Legislative Assembly election : Kalyan
Party	Candidate	Votes	%	±%
BJP	Harishchandra Patil	110,752	51.26%	▼6.40
INC	Alka Avalaskar	92,491	42.80%	▲8.61
BSP	Choudhari Ganesh Ramkrishna	4,704	2.18%	▲1.51
SP	Baban Ramnath Choubey	2,220	1.03%	New
Margin of victory		18,261	8.45%	▼15.01
Turnout		216,142	38.06%	▲1.76
Total valid votes		216,080		
Registered electors		567,938		▲17.01
BJP hold		Swing	▼6.40	

=== Assembly Election 1999 ===
1999 Maharashtra Legislative Assembly election : Kalyan
Party	Candidate	Votes	%	±%
BJP	Jagannath Shivram Patil	101,540	57.66%	▼3.23
INC	Dr. R. B. Singh	60,219	34.19%	▲5.60
Independent	Jadhav Pralhad Dunda	9,872	5.61%	New
PWPI	Chaudhari Sanjay Trimbak	2,428	1.38%	New
BSP	Kamble Vidyasagar Bhagwan	1,173	0.67%	New
Margin of victory		41,321	23.46%	▼8.83
Turnout		180,573	37.20%	▼19.80
Total valid votes		176,115		
Registered electors		485,388		▲2.09
BJP hold		Swing	▼3.23	

=== Assembly Election 1995 ===
1995 Maharashtra Legislative Assembly election : Kalyan
Party	Candidate	Votes	%	±%
BJP	Jagannath Shivram Patil	162,334	60.89%	▲0.90
INC	Jadhav Pralhad Dunda	76,247	28.60%	▼4.97
Independent	Vikas Digambar Patkar	5,656	2.12%	New
JD	Dixit Avadhut Surendra	5,424	2.03%	▼3.10
Independent	Asodekar Ravindra Sakharam	3,162	1.19%	New
SP	Khan Ramjan Ahemed Abdul Majid	2,894	1.09%	New
Independent	Rajwade Ramesh Ramkrishna	2,158	0.81%	New
Margin of victory		86,087	32.29%	▲5.87
Turnout		271,216	57.05%	▲3.27
Total valid votes		266,619		
Registered electors		475,433		▲41.88
BJP hold		Swing	▲0.90	

=== Assembly Election 1990 ===
1990 Maharashtra Legislative Assembly election : Kalyan
Party	Candidate	Votes	%	±%
BJP	Jagannath Shivram Patil	106,145	59.99%	▲16.75
INC	Bhoir Sudam Hari	59,392	33.56%	▼4.05
JD	Shivram Janu Gaikar	9,078	5.13%	New
Independent	Shakuntala Anant Paranjpe	1,069	0.60%	New
Margin of victory		46,753	26.42%	▲20.81
Turnout		178,820	53.36%	▲5.09
Total valid votes		176,950		
Registered electors		335,103		▲56.63
BJP hold		Swing	▲16.75	

=== Assembly Election 1985 ===
1985 Maharashtra Legislative Assembly election : Kalyan
Party	Candidate	Votes	%	±%
BJP	Ramchandra Ganesh Kapse	44,133	43.23%	▼12.79
INC	Shakuntala Paranjpe	38,400	37.62%	New
Independent	Thosar Shashikant Govind	7,888	7.73%	New
Independent	Davanna Ismail Ibrahim	6,089	5.96%	New
Independent	Vikram Sawarkar	2,115	2.07%	New
Independent	S. M. Shirsat	1,055	1.03%	New
Independent	Deoram Udhav Lihitkar	969	0.95%	New
Margin of victory		5,733	5.62%	▼11.59
Turnout		103,287	48.28%	▲7.74
Total valid votes		102,081		
Registered electors		213,939		▲22.66
BJP hold		Swing	▼12.79	

=== Assembly Election 1980 ===
1980 Maharashtra Legislative Assembly election : Kalyan
Party	Candidate	Votes	%	±%
BJP	Ramchandra Ganesh Kapse	39,066	56.03%	New
INC(I)	Pande Akhilesh Narayan	27,071	38.82%	New
INC(U)	Pawar Kusum Shankarrao	3,107	4.46%	New
Margin of victory		11,995	17.20%	▼20.66
Turnout		70,495	40.42%	▼27.61
Total valid votes		69,728		
Registered electors		174,415		▲23.07
BJP gain from JP		Swing	▲1.81	

=== Assembly Election 1978 ===
1978 Maharashtra Legislative Assembly election : Kalyan
Party	Candidate	Votes	%	±%
JP	Ramchandra Ganesh Kapse	51,933	54.22%	New
PWPI	Krishnarao Narayan Dhulap	15,672	16.36%	▼3.44
SS	Sabir Shaikh	15,076	15.74%	New
INC	Aher Namdeo Kashinath	8,029	8.38%	▼42.96
Independent	Sulochanabai Anantrao Nagrale	4,266	4.45%	New
Margin of victory		36,261	37.86%	▲12.38
Turnout		97,387	68.72%	▲7.44
Total valid votes		95,782		
Registered electors		141,719		▲9.27
JP gain from INC		Swing	▲2.88	

=== Assembly Election 1972 ===
1972 Maharashtra Legislative Assembly election : Kalyan
Party	Candidate	Votes	%	±%
INC	Nakul Pundlik Patil	40,048	51.34%	▲21.96
ABJS	Ramchandra Ganesh Kapse	20,171	25.86%	▼4.26
PWPI	Krishnarao Narayan Dhulap	15,447	19.80%	▼18.25
RPI	Tryambak Raghunath Jadhav	1,563	2.00%	New
RPI(K)	Sushilabai H. Khobragade	555	0.71%	New
Margin of victory		19,877	25.48%	▲17.55
Turnout		79,885	61.59%	▼5.04
Total valid votes		78,004		
Registered electors		129,696		▲37.26
INC gain from PWPI		Swing	▲13.29	

=== Assembly Election 1967 ===
1967 Maharashtra Legislative Assembly election : Kalyan
Party	Candidate	Votes	%	±%
PWPI	Krishnarao Narayan Dhulap	23,438	38.06%	▲2.86
ABJS	R. G. Kapse	18,553	30.12%	▲6.19
INC	S. K. Hande	18,095	29.38%	▼4.77
Independent	B. N. Gurav	723	1.17%	New
SWA	Amant Bhikaji Kulkarani	439	0.71%	New
Margin of victory		4,885	7.93%	▲6.89
Turnout		65,424	69.24%	▲7.79
Total valid votes		61,589		
Registered electors		94,490		▲34.73
PWPI hold		Swing	▲2.86	

=== Assembly Election 1962 ===
1962 Maharashtra Legislative Assembly election : Kalyan
Party	Candidate	Votes	%	±%
PWPI	Krishnarao Narayan Dhulap	14,164	35.19%	▼37.38
INC	Shankarrao Krishnarao Hande	13,744	34.15%	▲6.73
ABJS	Mukund Vishny Vaze	9,632	23.93%	New
PSP	Sudhakar Amrut Wavikar	1,831	4.55%	New
Independent	Amant Bhikaji Kulkarani	553	1.37%	New
RRP	Pandit Sakharam Kulkarni	323	0.80%	New
Margin of victory		420	1.04%	▲1.04
Turnout		42,657	60.82%	▼2.23
Total valid votes		40,247		
Registered electors		70,134		▲46.74
PWPI hold		Swing	▼37.38	

=== Assembly Election 1957 ===
1957 Bombay State Legislative Assembly election : Kalyan
Party	Candidate	Votes	%	±%
PWPI	Krishnarao Narayan Dhulap	20,680	72.58%	New
PWPI	Dhulup Krishnarao Narayan	20,680	72.58%	New
INC	Rohe Abidsaheb Abdulkadar	7,814	27.42%	New
INC	Rohe Abidsaheb Abdulkadar	7,814	27.42%	New
Turnout		28,494	59.62%	
Total valid votes		28,494		
Registered electors		47,795		
PWPI win (new seat)				

== See also ==
- List of constituencies of Maharashtra Legislative Assembly
