= Devendra Satam =

Indian politician

Member of Maharashtra Legislative Assembly
- In office 2004–2009
- Preceded by: Suresh Lad
- Succeeded by: Constituency defunct
- Constituency: Khalapur
- In office 1990–1999
- Preceded by: Suman Raut
- Succeeded by: Suresh Lad
- Constituency: Khalapur

Personal details
- Citizenship: Indian
- Party: Bhartiya Janata Party
- Other political affiliations: Shiv Sena
- Children: 2

Devendra Satam is an Indian politician. He is a former Member of the Legislative Assembly elected from Karjat Vidhan Sabha constituency. He was elected as a member of the Shiv Sena party. He switched to the Bhartiya Janata Party.
