= Khalapur Assembly constituency =

Constituency of the Maharashtra legislative assembly in India

Coordinates: 18.83°N 73.29°E

Khalapur
- Former constituency for the Maharashtra Legislative Assembly

Constituency details
- Country: India
- Region: Western India
- State: Maharashtra
- Lok Sabha constituency: Kolaba Lok Sabha constituency
- Established: 1962
- Abolished: 2008

Khalapur Assembly constituency was one of the 288 assembly constituencies of Maharashtra, a western state of India. Khalapur was also part of Kolaba Lok Sabha constituency. Khalapur seat existed till 2004 elections.

== Member of Legislative Assembly ==
Year	Member	Party
1962	Krishna Ramaji Mundhe	Peasants and Workers Party of India
1967	Sumant Rajaram Raut	Peasants and Workers Party of India
1972	Balkrishna Limbaji Patil	Indian National Congress
1978	Balkrishna Limbaji Patil	Indian National Congress
1980	Surve Tukaram Eknath	Indian National Congress
1985	Sumant Rajaram Raut	Peasants and Workers Party of India
1990	Devendra Vitthal Satam	Shiv Sena
1995	Devendra Vitthal Satam	Shiv Sena
1999	Suresh Narayan Lad	Nationalist Congress Party
2004	Devendra Vitthal Satam	Shiv Sena

== Election results ==
=== Assembly Election 2004 ===
2004 Maharashtra Legislative Assembly election : Khalapur
Party	Candidate	Votes	%	±%
SS	Devendra Vitthal Satam	51,632	31.95%	▲4.41
NCP	Suresh Narayan Lad	48,662	30.11%	▼3.21
PWPI	Santoshsheth Maruti Bhoir	41,093	25.43%	New
Independent	Bhoir Santosh Tukaram	6,644	4.11%	New
BSP	Kashinath Rupwate	4,056	2.51%	New
Independent	Patil Rajendra Hiraji	2,893	1.79%	New
Independent	Jagannath Parshuram Patil	2,373	1.47%	New
Margin of victory		2,970	1.84%	▼2.65
Turnout		1,61,629	69.45%	▲12.39
Total valid votes		1,61,606		
Registered electors		2,32,727		▲9.36
SS gain from NCP		Swing	▼1.37	

=== Assembly Election 1999 ===
1999 Maharashtra Legislative Assembly election : Khalapur
Party	Candidate	Votes	%	±%
NCP	Suresh Narayan Lad	36,853	33.32%	New
INC	Vasant Bhoir	31,891	28.83%	▲3.60
SS	Devendra Vitthal Satam	30,461	27.54%	▼8.13
Independent	Bhagat Bharat Ragho	8,357	7.56%	New
Independent	Prakash Vitthal Pawar	3,046	2.75%	New
Margin of victory		4,962	4.49%	▼5.95
Turnout		1,21,432	57.06%	▼14.27
Total valid votes		1,10,608		
Registered electors		2,12,813		▲7.05
NCP gain from SS		Swing	▼2.35	

=== Assembly Election 1995 ===
1995 Maharashtra Legislative Assembly election : Khalapur
Party	Candidate	Votes	%	±%
SS	Devendra Vitthal Satam	50,575	35.67%	▼7.16
INC	Ulhas Gajanan Deshumukh	35,783	25.24%	▼8.12
PWPI	Vilas Thorave	24,694	17.42%	▼3.59
Independent	Ramdas Kondiram Shende	22,603	15.94%	New
BBM	Adv. Bhusari Abdul Rashid	5,558	3.92%	New
Margin of victory		14,792	10.43%	▲0.96
Turnout		1,46,647	73.77%	▲10.19
Total valid votes		1,41,797		
Registered electors		1,98,800		▲11.69
SS hold		Swing	▼7.16	

=== Assembly Election 1990 ===
1990 Maharashtra Legislative Assembly election : Khalapur
Party	Candidate	Votes	%	±%
SS	Devendra Vitthal Satam	46,611	42.83%	New
INC	Mundhe Ram Ganpat	36,298	33.35%	▲6.69
PWPI	Sumant Rajaram Raut	22,856	21.00%	▼9.58
BSP	Kisan Jadhav	701	0.64%	New
Margin of victory		10,313	9.48%	▲5.56
Turnout		1,11,754	62.78%	▲10.48
Total valid votes		1,08,827		
Registered electors		1,77,999		▲33.91
SS gain from PWPI		Swing	▲12.25	

=== Assembly Election 1985 ===
1985 Maharashtra Legislative Assembly election : Khalapur
Party	Candidate	Votes	%	±%
PWPI	Raut Sumant Rajaram	20,594	30.58%	▲13.88
INC	Aftab Shaikh Mohammed	17,955	26.67%	New
Independent	Thange Vishnu Narayan	14,415	21.41%	New
Independent	Shelar Kisan Ganpat	4,114	6.11%	New
Independent	Kambale Parshuram	2,870	4.26%	New
Independent	Mahadik Baliram Sitaram	2,369	3.52%	New
CPI	Mokashi Madhav Dattatray	1,730	2.57%	New
Margin of victory		2,639	3.92%	▼9.31
Turnout		69,549	52.32%	▲2.91
Total valid votes		67,334		
Registered electors		1,32,920		▲12.89
PWPI gain from INC(I)		Swing	▼11.45	

=== Assembly Election 1980 ===
1980 Maharashtra Legislative Assembly election : Khalapur
Party	Candidate	Votes	%	±%
INC(I)	Surve Tukaram Eknath	23,635	42.04%	New
INC(U)	Balkrishna Limbaji Patil	16,198	28.81%	New
PWPI	Sugvekar Narhari Krushnaji	9,390	16.70%	▼7.36
BJP	Gangal Vishnu Prabhakar	4,730	8.41%	New
Independent	Mahadik Prakash Bhivaji	1,191	2.12%	New
RPI	Waghmare Manohar Laxman	875	1.56%	New
Margin of victory		7,437	13.23%	▲4.11
Turnout		58,051	49.30%	▼11.97
Total valid votes		56,224		
Registered electors		1,17,742		▲8.05
INC(I) gain from INC		Swing	▲8.87	

=== Assembly Election 1978 ===
1978 Maharashtra Legislative Assembly election : Khalapur
Party	Candidate	Votes	%	±%
INC	Balkrishna Limbaji Patil	21,587	33.17%	▼25.79
PWPI	Raut Sumant Rajaram	15,656	24.06%	▼6.35
JP	Gangal Vishnu Prabhakar	13,036	20.03%	New
Independent	Mahadik Baliram Sitaram	6,312	9.70%	New
Independent	Surve Tukaram Eknath	2,575	3.96%	New
CPI	Mokashi Madhav Dattatray	2,547	3.91%	New
Independent	Khopkar Prakash Dattatraya	1,706	2.62%	New
Margin of victory		5,931	9.11%	▼19.44
Turnout		67,769	62.19%	▲7.81
Total valid votes		65,079		
Registered electors		1,08,974		▲17.51
INC hold		Swing	▼25.79	

=== Assembly Election 1972 ===
1972 Maharashtra Legislative Assembly election : Khalapur
Party	Candidate	Votes	%	±%
INC	Balkrishna Limbaji Patil	28,381	58.96%	▲23.86
PWPI	Vishnu Narayan Thanage	14,636	30.41%	▼20.16
ABJS	Madhusudan R. Mahendale	4,168	8.66%	▼3.15
INC(O)	Dattatraya D. Phanase	951	1.98%	New
Margin of victory		13,745	28.55%	▲13.09
Turnout		50,371	54.32%	▼2.06
Total valid votes		48,136		
Registered electors		92,737		▲19.59
INC gain from PWPI		Swing	▲8.39	

=== Assembly Election 1967 ===
1967 Maharashtra Legislative Assembly election : Khalapur
Party	Candidate	Votes	%	±%
PWPI	S. R. Raut	21,161	50.57%	▼0.83
INC	Balkrishna Limbaji Patil	14,689	35.10%	▼0.67
ABJS	G. R. Patil	4,943	11.81%	▲2.47
PSP	Govind Sonu Katkari	1,055	2.52%	▼0.97
Margin of victory		6,472	15.47%	▼0.16
Turnout		45,295	58.41%	▲5.94
Total valid votes		41,848		
Registered electors		77,549		▲12.42
PWPI hold		Swing	▼0.83	

=== Assembly Election 1962 ===
1962 Maharashtra Legislative Assembly election : Khalapur
Party	Candidate	Votes	%	±%
PWPI	Krishna Ramaji Mundhe	17,027	51.40%	New
INC	Govind Sonu Katkari	11,850	35.77%	New
ABJS	Babu Kanu Katkari	3,096	9.35%	New
PSP	Gajanan Nana Shende	1,156	3.49%	New
Margin of victory		5,177	15.63%	
Turnout		35,841	51.96%	
Total valid votes		33,129		
Registered electors		68,984		
PWPI win (new seat)				

== See also ==
- Kolaba Lok Sabha constituency
- Shriwardhan Assembly constituency
- List of constituencies of Maharashtra Legislative Assembly
