= Laxman Pawar =

Indian politician

Laxman Madhavrao Pawar
- लक्ष्मण माधवराव पवार

Member of Maharashtra Legislative Assembly
- In office 2014–2024
- Preceded by: Badamrao Pandit
- Succeeded by: Vijaysinh Pandit
- Constituency: Georai

Personal details
- Party: Bharatiya Janata Party
- Occupation: Politician

Laxman Madhavrao Pawar is an Indian politician, the leader of Bharatiya Janata Party and a member of the Maharashtra Legislative Assembly elected from Georai Assembly constituency in Beed city.

== Positions held ==
- 2019: Elected to Maharashtra Legislative Assembly.
