= Georai Assembly constituency =

Constituency of the Maharashtra legislative assembly in India

Coordinates: 19.26°N 75.75°E

Georai
- Constituency No. 228 for the Maharashtra Legislative Assembly

Constituency details
- Country: India
- Region: Western India
- State: Maharashtra
- District: Beed
- Lok Sabha constituency: Beed
- Established: 1952
- Total electors: 380,109
- Reservation: None

Member of Legislative Assembly
- 15th Maharashtra Legislative Assembly
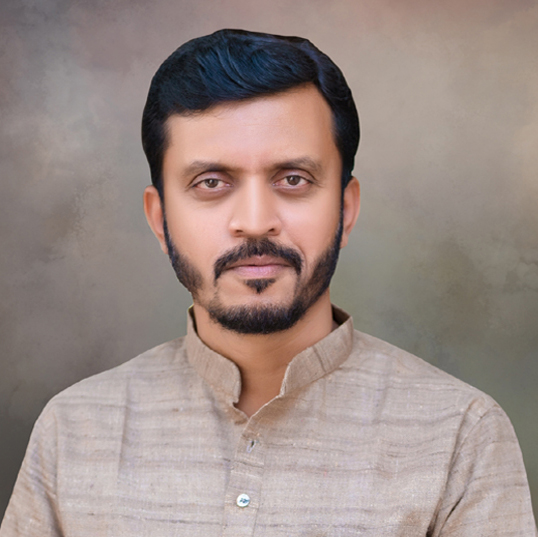
- Incumbent Vijaysinh Pandit
- Party: NCP
- Alliance: NDA
- Elected year: 2024

Georai Assembly constituency is one of the 288 Vidhan Sabha (legislative assembly) constituencies of Maharashtra state in western India.

== Overview ==
Georai (constituency number 228) is one of the six Vidhan Sabha constituencies located in the Beed district. It covers the entire Georai tehsil and parts of Majalgaon and Beed tehsils of this district.

Georai is part of the Beed Lok Sabha constituency along with all other Vidhan Sabha segments in this district, namely Parli, Majalgaon, Beed, Ashti and Kaij.

== Members of the Legislative Assembly ==
Election	Member	Party
1952	Ram Rao	People's Democratic Front
1957	Limbaji Mukataji	Indian National Congress
1962	Sayajirao Trayambakrao	Indian National Congress
1967	S. T. Pawar	Communist Party of India
1972	Sundarrao Solanke	Indian National Congress
1978	Shivajirao Ankushrao	Indian National Congress
1980	Pawar Madhavrao Alias Bappasaheb Shivajirao	Indian National Congress
1985	Shivajirao Ankushrao	Indian Congress
1990	Shivajirao Ankushrao	Indian National Congress
1995	Badamrao Pandit	Independent politician
1999	Badamrao Pandit	Independent politician
2004	Amarsinh Pandit	Bharatiya Janata Party
2009	Badamrao Pandit	Nationalist Congress Party
2014	Laxman Pawar	Bharatiya Janata Party
2019	Laxman Pawar	Bharatiya Janata Party
2024	Vijaysinh Pandit	Nationalist Congress Party

== Election results ==
=== Assembly Election 2024 ===
2024 Maharashtra Legislative Assembly election : Georai
Party	Candidate	Votes	%	±%
Nationalist Congress Party (post–2023)	Vijaysinh Pandit	116,141	41.80%	New
SS(UBT)	Badamrao Pandit	73,751	26.54%	New
Independent	Laxman Pawar	38,171	13.74%	New
VBA	Priyanka Shivprasad Khedkar	31,223	11.24%	▲8.06
Independent	Bedre Rushikesh Kailas	3,607	1.30%	New
MNS	Mayuri Balasaheb Maske-khedkar	3,215	1.16%	New
Independent	Badam Aappasaheb Gorde	2,003	0.72%	New
Independent	Prof. P. T. Chavhan	1,728	0.62%	New
Maharashtra Swarajya Party	Pooja Ashok More	1,710	0.62%	New
NOTA	None of the above	428	0.15%	▼0.03
Margin of victory		42,390	15.26%	▲12.66
Turnout		278,281	73.21%	▼1.04
Total valid votes		277,853		
Registered electors		380,109		▲7.87
Nationalist Congress Party (post–2023) gain from BJP		Swing	▲3.64	

=== Assembly Election 2019 ===
2019 Maharashtra Legislative Assembly election : Georai
Party	Candidate	Votes	%	±%
BJP	Laxman Pawar	99,625	38.16%	▼20.13
NCP	Vijaysinh Pandit	92,833	35.56%	▲2.91
Independent	Badamrao Pandit	50,894	19.49%	New
VBA	Vishnu Bhagwan Devkate	8,306	3.18%	New
CPI	Prabhale Bhaurao Durgadas	1,662	0.64%	▼0.44
NOTA	None of the above	478	0.18%	▼0.40
Margin of victory		6,792	2.60%	▼23.04
Turnout		261,641	74.25%	▼0.76
Total valid votes		261,076		
Registered electors		352,375		▲12.30
BJP hold		Swing	▼20.13	

=== Assembly Election 2014 ===
2014 Maharashtra Legislative Assembly election : Georai
Party	Candidate	Votes	%	±%
BJP	Laxman Pawar	136,384	58.29%	▲13.11
NCP	Badamrao Pandit	76,383	32.65%	▼13.60
INC	Suresh Dnyanoba Hatte	6,612	2.83%	New
SS	Ajay Ramkishn Dabhade	4,424	1.89%	New
CPI	Prabhale Bhaurao Durgadas	2,525	1.08%	New
BSP	Ughade Dilip Haribhau	2,087	0.89%	New
MNS	Mote Rajendra Kachru	1,574	0.67%	▲0.04
NOTA	None of the above	1,362	0.58%	New
Margin of victory		60,001	25.64%	▲24.56
Turnout		235,348	75.01%	▼0.60
Total valid votes		233,977		
Registered electors		313,770		▲8.82
BJP gain from NCP		Swing	▲12.04	

=== Assembly Election 2009 ===
2009 Maharashtra Legislative Assembly election : Georai
Party	Candidate	Votes	%	±%
NCP	Badamrao Pandit	100,816	46.25%	▲5.92
BJP	Amarsinh Pandit	98,469	45.18%	▼5.64
RSPS	Ingale Arun Rambhau	10,306	4.73%	▲3.83
Independent	Pandit Badamrao Devidas	3,141	1.44%	New
Independent	Pandit Avinash Appasaheb	1,532	0.70%	New
MNS	Chaudhari Mahesh Rakhmaji	1,380	0.63%	New
Margin of victory		2,347	1.08%	▼9.41
Turnout		218,010	75.61%	▼4.61
Total valid votes		217,967		
Registered electors		288,334		▲46.16
NCP gain from BJP		Swing	▼4.57	

=== Assembly Election 2004 ===
2004 Maharashtra Legislative Assembly election : Georai
Party	Candidate	Votes	%	±%
BJP	Amarsinh Pandit	80,414	50.82%	New
NCP	Badamrao Pandit	63,814	40.33%	▼0.06
Independent	Balkrishna Prabhu Gavhane	5,244	3.31%	New
Independent	Badam Alias Aba Ramrao Bharti	2,913	1.84%	New
BSP	Magar Vishwanath Baburao	1,439	0.91%	▲0.68
RSPS	Mundhe Narayan Shrimantrao	1,431	0.90%	New
Margin of victory		16,600	10.49%	▼4.50
Turnout		158,240	80.22%	▲0.84
Total valid votes		158,238		
Registered electors		197,269		▲14.22
BJP gain from Independent		Swing	▼4.56	

=== Assembly Election 1999 ===
1999 Maharashtra Legislative Assembly election : Georai
Party	Candidate	Votes	%	±%
Independent	Badamrao Pandit	68,937	55.38%	New
NCP	Pandit Amarsinh Shivajirao	50,272	40.39%	New
INC	Bansidhar Ramkrishna Pandit	2,724	2.19%	▼25.29
Independent	Manohar Chimaji Chalak	1,846	1.48%	New
Margin of victory		18,665	14.99%	▼20.60
Turnout		137,095	79.38%	▲8.58
Total valid votes		124,479		
Registered electors		172,714		▲4.57
Independent hold		Swing	▼7.69	

=== Assembly Election 1995 ===
1995 Maharashtra Legislative Assembly election : Georai
Party	Candidate	Votes	%	±%
Independent	Badamrao Pandit	71,362	63.07%	New
INC	Shivajirao Ankushrao	31,095	27.48%	▼40.85
Independent	Pawar Gangaram Keshavrao	4,708	4.16%	New
SS	Pisal Jalindar Malharrao	3,637	3.21%	▼17.59
Margin of victory		40,267	35.59%	▼11.94
Turnout		116,936	70.80%	▲8.50
Total valid votes		113,155		
Registered electors		165,166		▲0.97
Independent gain from INC		Swing	▼5.26	

=== Assembly Election 1990 ===
1990 Maharashtra Legislative Assembly election : Georai
Party	Candidate	Votes	%	±%
INC	Shivajirao Ankushrao	67,770	68.33%	▲28.53
SS	Suryakant Alias Vaijinath Suryabhan Yewle	20,630	20.80%	New
INS(SCS)	Pawar Janardan Kisanrao Pawar Janardan Kisanrao	4,146	4.18%	New
JD	Ramrao Raosaheb Minde	3,913	3.95%	New
Independent	Chandrashekhar Madhav Gavli	1,316	1.33%	New
Independent	S. Jainul Abbeddin Hafijoddin	639	0.64%	New
Margin of victory		47,140	47.53%	▲29.93
Turnout		101,903	62.30%	▼2.81
Total valid votes		99,177		
Registered electors		163,575		▲24.07
INC gain from IC(S)		Swing	▲10.93	

=== Assembly Election 1985 ===
1985 Maharashtra Legislative Assembly election : Georai
Party	Candidate	Votes	%	±%
IC(S)	Shivajirao Ankushrao	47,844	57.40%	New
INC	Madhavrao Shivajirao Pawar	33,175	39.80%	New
Independent	Borde Sitaram Dajiba	805	0.97%	New
Independent	Bhosle Babasaheb Raosaheb	769	0.92%	New
Independent	Agarkar Uttamrao Govind	759	0.91%	New
Margin of victory		14,669	17.60%	▲17.38
Turnout		85,846	65.11%	▲1.79
Total valid votes		83,352		
Registered electors		131,841		▲11.33
IC(S) gain from INC(U)		Swing	▲9.23	

=== Assembly Election 1980 ===
1980 Maharashtra Legislative Assembly election : Georai
Party	Candidate	Votes	%	±%
INC(U)	Pawar Madhavrao Alias Bappasaheb Shivajirao	34,798	48.17%	New
INC(I)	Shivajirao Ankushrao	34,641	47.96%	▲41.62
RPI	Potbhare Baburao Rambhau	2,795	3.87%	New
Margin of victory		157	0.22%	▼22.32
Turnout		74,992	63.32%	▼1.55
Total valid votes		72,234		
Registered electors		118,428		▲10.59
INC(U) gain from INC		Swing	▼9.93	

=== Assembly Election 1978 ===
1978 Maharashtra Legislative Assembly election : Georai
Party	Candidate	Votes	%	±%
INC	Shivajirao Ankushrao	38,539	58.10%	New
JP	Mindhe Ramrao Raosaheb	23,590	35.56%	New
INC(I)	Kapse Panditrao Rangnathrao	4,207	6.34%	New
Margin of victory		14,949	22.54%	
Turnout		69,468	64.87%	
Total valid votes		66,336		
Registered electors		107,087		
INC hold		Swing		

=== Assembly Election 1972 ===
1972 Maharashtra Legislative Assembly election : Georai
Party	Candidate	Votes	%	±%
INC	Sundarrao Solanke	Unopposed		
Registered electors		92,969		▲16.52
INC win (new seat)				

=== Assembly Election 1967 ===
1967 Maharashtra Legislative Assembly election : Georai
Party	Candidate	Votes	%	±%
CPI	S. T. Pawar	23,376	56.47%	▲10.58
INC	S. T. Pandit	16,960	40.97%	▼8.93
ABJS	N. B. Khedker	1,060	2.56%	New
Margin of victory		6,416	15.50%	▲11.48
Turnout		44,357	55.59%	▲12.81
Total valid votes		41,396		
Registered electors		79,789		▲18.25
CPI gain from INC		Swing	▲6.57	

=== Assembly Election 1962 ===
1962 Maharashtra Legislative Assembly election : Georai
Party	Candidate	Votes	%	±%
INC	Sayajirao Trayambakrao	13,408	49.90%	▼5.85
CPI	Shivajirao Trimbakrao	12,329	45.89%	▲1.64
Independent	Krishnath Someshwar	1,131	4.21%	New
Margin of victory		1,079	4.02%	▼7.47
Turnout		28,867	42.78%	▲14.34
Total valid votes		26,868		
Registered electors		67,473		▲15.89
INC hold		Swing	▼5.85	

=== Assembly Election 1957 ===
1957 Bombay State Legislative Assembly election : Georai
Party	Candidate	Votes	%	±%
INC	Limbaji Mukataji	9,232	55.75%	▲14.87
CPI	Udhav Bayaji	7,329	44.25%	New
Margin of victory		1,903	11.49%	▼1.41
Turnout		16,561	28.44%	▼9.28
Total valid votes		16,561		
Registered electors		58,222		▲0.98
INC gain from PDF		Swing	▲1.97	

=== Assembly Election 1952 ===
1952 Hyderabad State Legislative Assembly election : Georai
Party	Candidate	Votes	%	±%
PDF	Ram Rao	11,696	53.78%	New
INC	Tukaram	8,891	40.88%	New
Independent	Krishnaji Alias (Bapurao)	1,162	5.34%	New
Margin of victory		2,805	12.90%	
Turnout		21,749	37.72%	
Total valid votes		21,749		
Registered electors		57,657		
PDF win (new seat)				

== See also ==
- Gevrai
- List of constituencies of Maharashtra Vidhan Sabha
