= Mahendra Thorve =

Indian politician

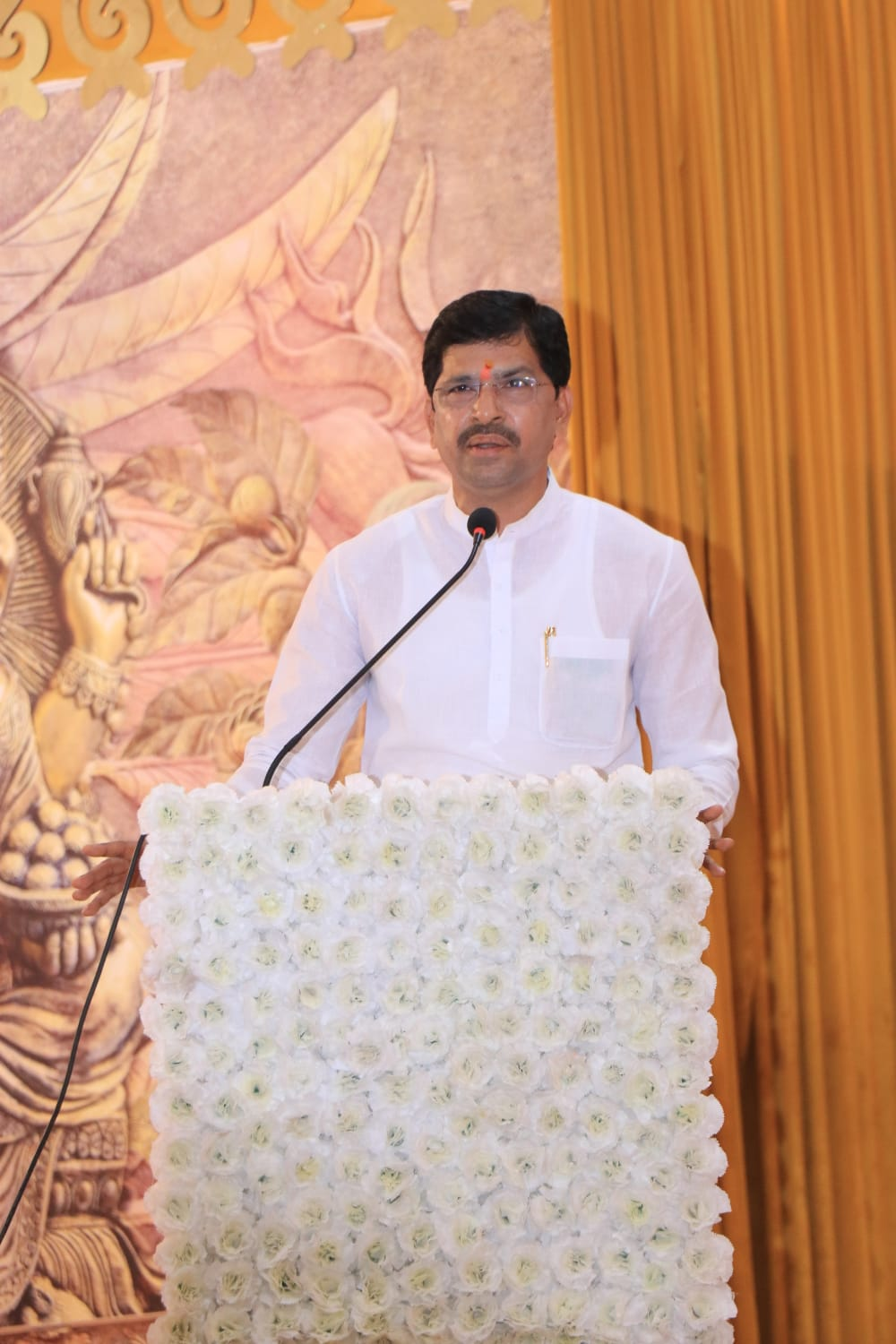

Member of Legislative Assembly Maharashtra
- Incumbent
- Assumed office 21 October 2019
- Preceded by: Suresh Narayan Lad, NCP
- Constituency: Karjat

Personal details
- Born: 15 May 1973 (52 Years old ) Posari Taluka Karjat Raigad
- Citizenship: India
- Party: Shiv Sena
- Other political affiliations: Peasants and Workers Party of India
- Spouse: M..na Thorve
- Children: Sushant thorve Surbhi thorve
- Parent: Sadashiv Thorve (father)
- Education: 10th Passed
- Profession: Businessperson and Builder

Mahendra Thorve is an Indian politician serving as Member of the Maharashtra Legislative Assembly from Karjat Vidhan Sabha constituency as a member of Shiv Sena.

== Positions held ==
- 2019: Elected to Maharashtra Legislative Assembly
- 2024: Re-Elected to Maharashtra Legislative Assembly
