= Krishnarao Dhulap =

Indian politician

Krishnarao Dhulap (21 December 1920 – 14 February 1989) was a leader of Peasants and Workers Party of India. He was a member of Maharashtra Legislative Assembly and served as leader of the opposition from 1962 to 1972. Dhulap was a member of Rajya Sabha from 1974 to 1980.
