= Suresh Narayan Lad =

Indian politician

Suresh Narayan Lad Ex-Member of Legislative Assembly Maharashtra

District President of Raigad Nationalist Congress Party State of Maharashtra
- In office 25 July 2020 – 25 April 2022
- State President Nationalist Congress Party: Jayant Patil

Member of Legislative Assembly Maharashtra
- In office 30 October 2009 – 21 October 2019
- Preceded by: Himself as Khalapur Assembly constituency
- Succeeded by: Mahendra Thorve
- Constituency: Karjat
- In office 16 October 1999 – 25 October 2004
- Preceded by: Devendra Satam
- Succeeded by: Devendra Satam
- Constituency: Khalapur

Personal details
- Citizenship: India
- Party: Bharatiya Janata Party Starting 2024; Nationalist Congress Party till 2023
- Parent: Narayan Bhikaji Lad (father)
- Education: 10th Pass; From Janta Vidhya Mandir School, Dahivali, Raigad

Suresh Narayan Lad is an Indian politician serving as member of the 13th Maharashtra Legislative Assembly. He represents the Karjat Assembly Constituency. He belongs to the Nationalist Congress Party. He was elected consecutively for 2 terms in the Maharashtra Legislative Assembly in 2009 and 2014.
