= Womanist Party of India =

- President: Varsha Kale
- General Secretary: Avisha Kulkarni
- Founded: October 31, 2003
- Headquarters: Mumbai, India
- Ideology: Women's rights, Feminism

Womanist Party of India (also called Bharatiya Streevadi Paksh), is a political party in India. Its core issue is the emancipation of women. The WPI was founded in Mumbai on October 31, 2003. The WPI president is Varsha Kale, and the General Secretary is Avisha Kulkarni.

The party decided to call itself 'womanist' as they consider the word 'feminist' to carry an upper-class connotation in India.
