= Lok Rajya Party =

Political party in India

The Lok Rajya Party is a political party in the Indian state of Maharashtra. The LRP is based amongst the Backward Castes.
