= Karjat Assembly constituency =

Constituency of the Maharashtra legislative assembly in India

Coordinates: 18.91°N 73.32°E

Karjat
- Constituency No. 189 for the Maharashtra Legislative Assembly

Constituency details
- Country: India
- Region: Western India
- State: Maharashtra
- Division: Karjat
- District: Raigad
- Lok Sabha constituency: Maval
- Assembly constituencies: Karjat
- Established: 1962
- Total electors: 318,810
- Reservation: None

Member of Legislative Assembly
- 15th Maharashtra Legislative Assembly
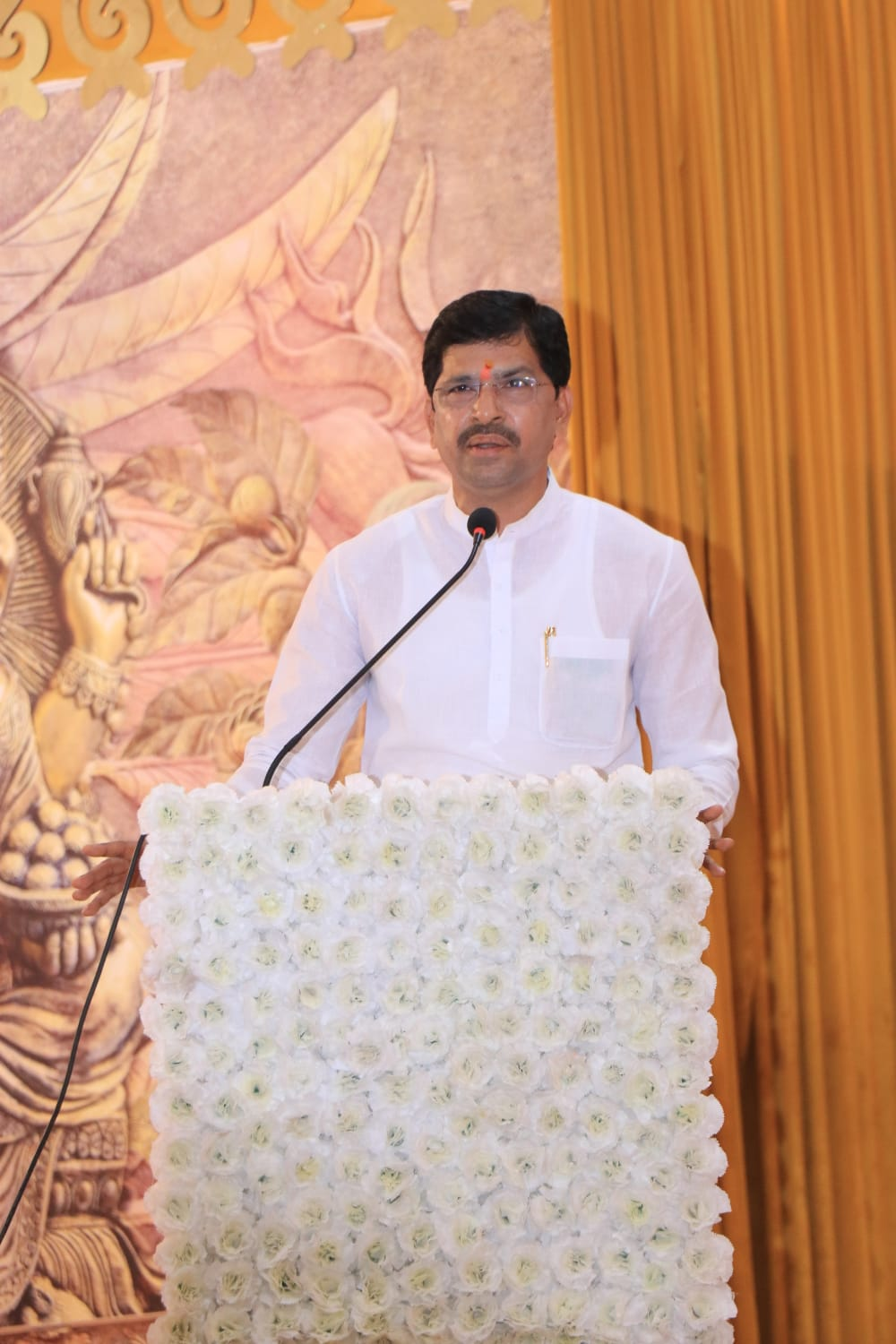
- Incumbent Mahendra Thorve
- Party: SHS
- Alliance: NDA
- Elected year: 2024

Karjat Assembly constituency is one of the 288 Vidhan Sabha (legislative assembly) constituencies in Maharashtra state in western India. This constituency is located in the Raigad district.

== Members of the Legislative Assembly ==
Year	Member	Party
1962	Eknath Buwasaheb Nimbalkar	Indian National Congress
1967	Eknath Buwasaheb Nimbalkar	Indian National Congress
1972	Rao Saheb Nimbalkar	Indian National Congress
1978	Bajirao Dashrath Kamble	Republican Party of India
1980	Dagadu Sakharam Nikalji (Guruji)	Indian National Congress
1985	Dagadu Sakharam Nikalji (Guruji)	Indian National Congress
1990	Vittal Sahadu Bhailume	Indian National Congress
1995	Sadashiv Lokhande	Bharatiya Janata Party
1999	Sadashiv Lokhande	Bharatiya Janata Party
2004	Sadashiv Lokhande	Bharatiya Janata Party
2009	Suresh Narayan Lad	Nationalist Congress Party
2014	Suresh Narayan Lad	Nationalist Congress Party
2019	Mahendra Sadashiv Thorve	Shiv Sena
2024	Mahendra Sadashiv Thorve	Shiv Sena

== Election results ==
=== Assembly Election 2024 ===
2024 Maharashtra Legislative Assembly election : Karjat
Party	Candidate	Votes	%	±%
SS	Mahendra Sadashiv Thorve	94,871	39.85%	▼11.98
Independent	Sudhakar Parshuram Ghare	89,177	37.46%	New
SS(UBT)	Nitin Nandkumar Sawant	48,929	20.55%	New
Independent	Sudhakar Yadavrao Ghare	2,361	0.99%	New
NOTA	None of the Above	1,956	0.82%	▼0.74
Margin of victory		5,694	2.39%	▼6.76
Turnout		239,999	75.28%	▲4.82
Total valid votes		238,043		
Registered electors		318,810		▲12.93
SS hold		Swing	▼11.98	

=== Assembly Election 2019 ===
2019 Maharashtra Legislative Assembly election : Karjat
Party	Candidate	Votes	%	±%
SS	Mahendra Sadashiv Thorve	102,208	51.84%	▲29.30
NCP	Suresh Narayan Lad	84,162	42.68%	▲11.13
VBA	Akram Mohammed Islam Khan	4,214	2.14%	New
NOTA	None of the Above	3,072	1.56%	▲0.16
BSP	Suresh Chintaman Gaikwad	1,493	0.76%	▼0.86
CPI	Adv. Gopal Gunja Shelake	1,240	0.63%	New
Independent	Jaitu Kanu Pirkad	1,216	0.62%	New
Margin of victory		18,046	9.15%	▲8.10
Turnout		200,278	70.94%	▼4.50
Total valid votes		197,171		
Registered electors		282,310		▲16.14
SS gain from NCP		Swing	▲20.29	

=== Assembly Election 2014 ===
2014 Maharashtra Legislative Assembly election : Karjat
Party	Candidate	Votes	%	±%
NCP	Suresh Narayan Lad	57,013	31.55%	▲2.88
PWPI	Mahendra Sadashiv Thorve	55,113	30.50%	New
SS	Pingle Hanumant Yashwant	40,721	22.53%	▲4.73
BJP	Yerunkar Rajendra Eknath	12,990	7.19%	New
INC	Kharik Shivaji Babu	5,939	3.29%	New
MNS	J. P. Patil	4,746	2.63%	▼8.97
BSP	Dolas Rupesh Pandurang	2,922	1.62%	New
NOTA	None of the Above	2,521	1.40%	New
Margin of victory		1,900	1.05%	▼9.81
Turnout		183,287	75.40%	▲5.53
Total valid votes		180,702		
Registered electors		243,076		▲14.92
NCP hold		Swing	▲2.88	

=== Assembly Election 2009 ===
2009 Maharashtra Legislative Assembly election : Karjat
Party	Candidate	Votes	%	±%
NCP	Suresh Narayan Lad	41,727	28.67%	New
SS	Devendra Satam	25,917	17.81%	New
Independent	Hanumant Yashwant Pingale	24,987	17.17%	New
MNS	Eknath Pandurang Pingale	16,876	11.60%	New
Independent	Savalaram Hiraji Jadhav	12,749	8.76%	New
RPI(A)	Uttam Maya Jadhav	6,441	4.43%	New
Independent	Pundlik (Bandhu) Tukaram Patil	5,092	3.50%	New
Margin of victory		15,810	10.86%	▲5.39
Turnout		145,552	68.81%	▲9.15
Total valid votes		145,543		
Registered electors		211,523		▲6.63
NCP gain from BJP		Swing	▼19.09	

=== Assembly Election 2004 ===
2004 Maharashtra Legislative Assembly election : Karjat
Party	Candidate	Votes	%	±%
BJP	Sadashiv Kisan Lokhande	56,524	47.76%	▼8.56
INC	Arvind Shahurao Kalookhe	50,051	42.29%	▲26.34
RSPS	Meghadamber Ashok Kanhuji	4,098	3.46%	New
BSP	Prabhakar Rupawate	2,096	1.77%	New
Independent	Sunil Ajinath Salave	1,981	1.67%	New
Independent	Misal Baban Sitaram	1,446	1.22%	New
BBM	Rakshe Rajendra Madhukar	787	0.67%	New
Margin of victory		6,473	5.47%	▼33.37
Turnout		118,348	59.66%	▲2.47
Total valid votes		118,344		
Registered electors		198,363		▲15.25
BJP hold		Swing	▼8.56	

=== Assembly Election 1999 ===
1999 Maharashtra Legislative Assembly election : Karjat
Party	Candidate	Votes	%	±%
BJP	Lokhande Sadashiv Kisan	55,440	56.32%	▲1.74
Independent	Kalokhe Shahurao Bhaurao	17,203	17.48%	New
INC	Kusalkar Rajaram Laxman	15,703	15.95%	▼17.02
Independent	Abdule Janardhan Yadav	5,408	5.49%	New
Independent	Gaikwad Kisan Bhimaji	1,108	1.13%	New
Independent	Ghodake Jaising Tukaram	722	0.73%	New
Margin of victory		38,237	38.84%	▲17.24
Turnout		109,122	63.40%	▼13.13
Total valid votes		98,441		
Registered electors		172,121		▲2.79
BJP hold		Swing	▲1.74	

=== Assembly Election 1995 ===
1995 Maharashtra Legislative Assembly election : Karjat
Party	Candidate	Votes	%	±%
BJP	Lokhande Sadashiv Kisan	64,269	54.58%	▲28.27
INC	Premanand Dadasaheb Rupwate	38,834	32.98%	▼15.74
JD	Kalokhe Shahurao Bhaurao	4,333	3.68%	▼16.59
Independent	Chavan Balasaheb Manohar	2,911	2.47%	New
Independent	Kale Radhakrushna Machchindra	1,359	1.15%	New
Hindustan Janta Party	Adhav Sopan Nana	1,180	1.00%	New
BBM	Ghaytadak Siddharth Maruti	1,112	0.94%	New
Margin of victory		25,435	21.60%	▼0.81
Turnout		122,423	73.11%	▲15.70
Total valid votes		117,762		
Registered electors		167,453		▲9.32
BJP gain from INC		Swing	▲5.86	

=== Assembly Election 1990 ===
1990 Maharashtra Legislative Assembly election : Karjat
Party	Candidate	Votes	%	±%
INC	Bhailume Vittal Sahadu	40,764	48.72%	▲14.56
BJP	Lokhande Sadashiv Kisan	22,015	26.31%	New
JD	Patil Ranjana Onkar	16,961	20.27%	New
BRP	Waghmare Madan Janu	2,198	2.63%	New
Independent	Vilas Laxman Tryambake	654	0.78%	New
Margin of victory		18,749	22.41%	▲16.81
Turnout		86,199	56.27%	▲3.81
Total valid votes		83,676		
Registered electors		153,176		▲22.70
INC hold		Swing	▲14.56	

=== Assembly Election 1985 ===
1985 Maharashtra Legislative Assembly election : Karjat
Party	Candidate	Votes	%	±%
INC	Dagadu Sakharam Nikalji (Guruji)	21,668	34.16%	New
Independent	Prabhakarao Rupawate	18,116	28.56%	New
JP	Ranjana Onkar Patil	16,900	26.64%	New
Independent	Siddharth Maruti Ghaitadak	2,298	3.62%	New
Independent	Eknath Bapuji Shinde	1,535	2.42%	New
Independent	Kamble Pratap Shankarrao	819	1.29%	New
Independent	Kanta Ramchandra Borade	705	1.11%	New
Margin of victory		3,552	5.60%	▼7.46
Turnout		65,333	52.34%	▲5.45
Total valid votes		63,432		
Registered electors		124,835		▲12.58
INC gain from INC(U)		Swing	▼17.59	

=== Assembly Election 1980 ===
1980 Maharashtra Legislative Assembly election : Karjat
Party	Candidate	Votes	%	±%
INC(U)	Nikalje Dagadu Sakharam	26,031	51.75%	New
INC(I)	Budhhivant Tukaram Kashinath	19,463	38.69%	▲31.38
BJP	Pawar Subhash Yashwant	2,916	5.80%	New
[[Janata Party (Secular) Charan Singh|Janata Party (Secular) Charan Singh]]	Gajbhiv Bhanudas Honaji	898	1.79%	New
RPI(K)	Gaikwad Ramesh Bhimarao	885	1.76%	New
Margin of victory		6,568	13.06%	▲13.01
Turnout		52,143	47.03%	▼11.25
Total valid votes		50,301		
Registered electors		110,882		▲12.27
INC(U) gain from RPI		Swing	▲10.34	

=== Assembly Election 1978 ===
1978 Maharashtra Legislative Assembly election : Karjat
Party	Candidate	Votes	%	±%
RPI	Kamble Bajirao Dashrath	23,157	41.42%	New
JP	Bharaskar Baburao Madhadev	23,133	41.37%	New
INC(I)	Shinde Vijay Prabhakar	4,089	7.31%	New
Independent	Shinde Ganpat Govind	1,856	3.32%	New
Independent	Rokade Balkrishna Ramchandra	1,752	3.13%	New
Independent	Shinde Eknath Bapuji	1,468	2.63%	New
Independent	Avhad Kisan Shankar	459	0.82%	New
Margin of victory		24	0.04%	▼61.00
Turnout		58,286	59.02%	▲6.75
Total valid votes		55,914		
Registered electors		98,760		▲12.83
RPI gain from INC		Swing	▼39.11	

=== Assembly Election 1972 ===
1972 Maharashtra Legislative Assembly election : Karjat
Party	Candidate	Votes	%	±%
INC	Nimbalkar Rao Saheb	35,146	80.52%	▲18.04
ABJS	Zarakar Rajaram Murlidhar	8,502	19.48%	▼0.13
Margin of victory		26,644	61.04%	▲18.17
Turnout		45,504	51.99%	▼7.40
Total valid votes		43,648		
Registered electors		87,530		▲15.39
INC hold		Swing	▲18.04	

=== Assembly Election 1967 ===
1967 Maharashtra Legislative Assembly election : Karjat
Party	Candidate	Votes	%	±%
INC	E. B. Nimbalkar	27,142	62.48%	▲1.09
ABJS	R. M. Zarkar	8,519	19.61%	▲11.12
CPI	B. E. Nikam	7,780	17.91%	New
Margin of victory		18,623	42.87%	▲7.98
Turnout		46,813	61.71%	▲7.95
Total valid votes		43,441		
Registered electors		75,855		▲7.42
INC hold		Swing	▲1.09	

=== Assembly Election 1962 ===
1962 Maharashtra Legislative Assembly election : Karjat
Party	Candidate	Votes	%	±%
INC	Eknath Buwasaheb Nimbalkar	21,381	61.39%	New
Independent	Hirabai Prabhakar Bhapkar	9,230	26.50%	New
ABJS	Rajaram Murlidhar Zarkar	2,958	8.49%	New
Independent	Kalyanrao Raosaheb Patil	1,259	3.61%	New
Margin of victory		12,151	34.89%	
Turnout		37,574	53.21%	
Total valid votes		34,828		
Registered electors		70,615		
INC win (new seat)				

== See also ==
- Karjat
- List of constituencies of Maharashtra Vidhan Sabha
