= Badamrao Pandit =

Indian politician

Badamrao Lahurao Pandit

Minister of state Government of Maharashtra
- In office 2009–2014

Member of Legislative Assembly of Maharashtra
- In office 2009–2014
- Preceded by: Amarsinh Pandit
- Succeeded by: Laxman Pawar
- Constituency: Georai

Personal details
- Born: 3 May 1955 (age 71) Doithan, Beed, Maharashtra 413207
- Party: Bharatiya Janata Party
- Other political affiliations: Shiv Sena (UBT)
- Spouse: Girika Pandit
- Children: Yudhajit Pandit, Yashraj Pandit
- Parents: Lahurao Pandit (father); Rajabai Pandit (mother)

Badamrao Lahurao Pandit is a leader of Bhartiya Janata party from Georai, Beed district in Marathwada, India. He was a member of the legislative assembly from Georai (Vidhan Sabha constituency) and a former minister of state in Maharashtra. He was also an independent MLA from Georai in1995 and 1999.

Nicknamed as Aaba, he is a backbone of Dalits and the poor.

His children are named Yudhajit Pandit and Yashraj Pandit.

== Positions held ==
- 1995: Elected to Maharashtra Legislative Assembly
- 1999: Re-elected to Maharashtra Legislative Assembly
- 2009: Re-elected to Maharashtra Legislative Assembly
- 2009: Appointed as minister of state in Maharashtra Government
