= Harishchandra Patil =

Indian politician

Harishchandra Patil is an Indian politician and member of the Bharatiya Janata Party. Patil was a member of the Maharashtra Legislative Assembly from the Kalyan East constituency in Thane district. He was mayor of Kalyan-Dombivli Municipal Corporation and was also Leader of Opposition.
