= Amarsinh Pandit =

Indian politician

Amarsinha Shivajirao Pandit
- अमरसिंह शिवाजीराव पंडित
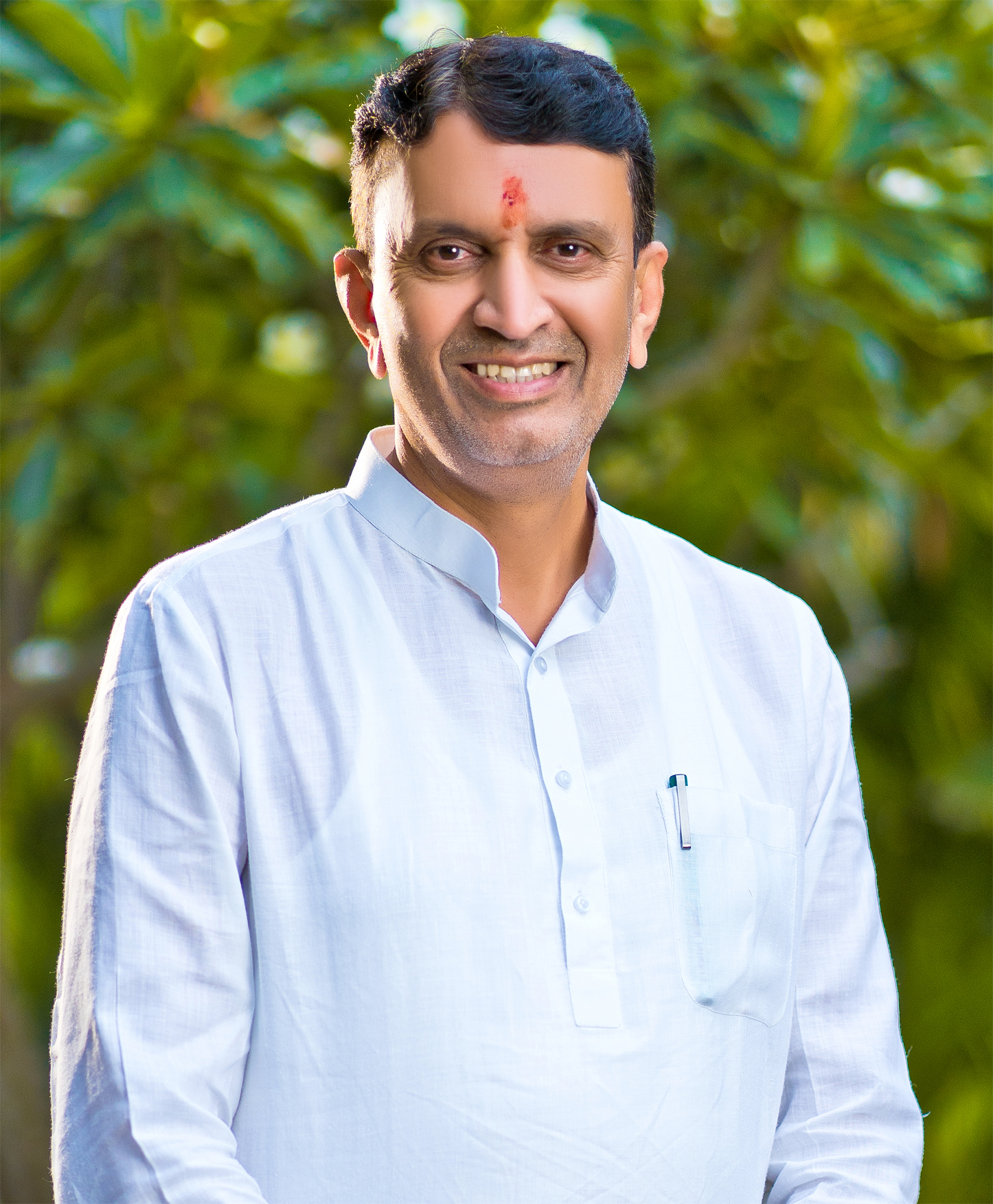
- Amarsinh Shivajirao Pandit

Member of Maharashtra Legislative Assembly (2004–2009)
- Preceded by: Badamrao Pandit
- Succeeded by: Badamrao Pandit
- Constituency: Georai

Member of Maharashtra Legislative Council (27 July 2012 to 30 July 2018)

Personal details
- Born: 31 May 1964 (age 62) Daithan, Tq. Georai - Beed
- Party: Nationalist Congress Party
- Spouse: Sau. Amruta Amarsinha Pandit
- Relations: Shri. Jaisingh Shivajirao Pandit Shri. Vijaysinha Shivajirao Pandit
- Children: Padmanjali Amarsinha Pandit Ranveer Amarsinha Pandit
- Occupation: Political & Social Activist
- Nickname: Bhaiyyasaheb
- Amarsinh Shivajirao Pandit

Amarsinh Pandit (born 30 May 1964) is an Indian politician and member of the Nationalist Congress Party. Amarsinha Shivajirao Pandit is a former member of the Maharashtra Legislative Council from the Georai constituency in Beed district as Nationalist Congress Party candidate. He was a former member of Maharashtra Legislative Assembly elected from Georai constituency in Maharashtra, India.

== Early life and family ==
Amarsinha was born as a eldest son of the three children to Shri. Shivajirao Pandit and Shardadevi Pandit on 31 May 1964. He inherited sportsmanship from his father and he is very much fond of lawn tennis particularly. He is the president of Champavati Krida Mandal, Beed and is serving as Vice President of Maharashtra State Kabaddi Association since 2018. He encouraged his son Ranveer to be a sportsman and chose sports as a career.

== Political career ==
Around the year 1990, Amarsinha Pandit started his political life. He took his first step into politics by assuming the Chairman post of Jaibhavani Cooperative Sugar Factory from 05/08/1990 up to 18/06/2009 and then 22/07/2017 till date. In the year 1992 became the chairman of the Panchayat Samiti, Georai from (14/03/1992 to 13/03/1997). In his later political career Amarsinha Pandit worked very effectively as the Leader of the Opposition in the Zilla Parishad in the year 1997 to 2004. As a result of his development and visionary work carried out during his tenure as opposition leader in Zilla Parishad, Beed he got elected for Maharashtra Legislative Assembly in the year 2004 from Georai.

He employed various parliamentary strategies effectively within the assembly, achieving prominence within a brief period. He subsequently established a reputation in the legislature for his scholarly approach, as well as his passionate and eloquent oratory. During his tenure as a member of Legislative Council from 27 July 2012 to 30 July 2018 he raised many issues like water irrigation, employment, famine etc. not only for Beed but also for entire Marathwada. Along with that he has also worked in various positions like, State General Secretary, Nationalist Congress Party, Member Legislative Public Accounts Committee, Mumbai (26/05/2015 to 30/07/2018), Member the Assembly Dr. Babvasaheb Ambedkar Marathwada University, Sambhajinagar(12/12/2017 to 27/07/2018), Vice-President Maharashtra Kabaddi Association (since 27/11/2018), Vice-President Marathwada Shikshan Prasarak Mandal (4/6/2018 to 10/6/2023), Secretary General Marathwada Shikshan Prasarak Mandal (2012-2018), Director the Bhavani Urban Co.op.Bank Ltd. Georai, President Jagdamba Shikshan Prasarak Mandal Beed, President Jaibhavani Shikshan Prasarak Mandal Georai, President Sharda Pratishthan Georai.

Having entered politics after studying in an English medium school, many had doubts about his political career. But he has proved himself as a successful politician facing many successes and failures. In rural areas, he gathered many colleagues of faith. His friendship with Bappasaheb Talekar, Bhausaheb Natkar and many others had a great impact in later politics. In the year 1992, he created a political earthquake in the taluka by assuming the post of chairman of the Panchayat Samiti. At that time his uncle Badamrao Pandit was his competitor and opponent. The same spark turned the tide of politics and the people of the taluka got to experience the politics of fraternity.

Amarsingh Pandit worked as the Leader of the Opposition in the Zilla Parishad. After coming to power, he received a large fund from the Zilla Parishad for development works in Gevarai Taluka. Taking advantage of that, he was elected to the Legislative Assembly in 2004. He used various strategies to gain notoriety. In a short time, he became known in the Legislature for his speaking skills.

Through Sharda Pratishthan, he organized spectacular mass weddings in Gevrai taluka continuously since 1999. About 2000 couples have been married so far. Through Sharda Mahotsav, he organized state level professional men and women Kabaddi competitions, lectures, water conference, agricultural exhibition and provided cultural sports and entertainment hall to Georaikars. His work during the flood situation in Gevrai taluk in the year 2006 was unforgettable. He provided support to the disaster victims by providing all facilities including food and accommodation. From the year 2009, Padmarshi Dr. Tatyasaheb Lahane was brought to Georai and organized an eye surgery camp. At this time, he did the work of giving new sight by successful surgery on about 1000 eyeballs. A cancer diagnosis camp was organized on a large scale by bringing well-known oncologists like Dr. Nene in the taluka. He helped in the treatment of many cancer patients.

Amarsingh Pandit made conscious efforts to increase the irrigated area in Gevrai taluka. A series of cement dams, Pazar lakes and village lakes were constructed in the taluka, including the Sirasmarg barrage on the Sindfana river, the Kolhapuri-style dams at Etkur, Ankuta and Taklagavan. The Kekatpangri storage pond scheme was approved and its work started. At the same time, water availability certificate was made available for new schemes in seven places like Paulachiwadi, Khalegaon, Mategaon, Ardha Sala etc.

== Social Activities ==
Amarsinha inherited social responsibilities from his father honorable Shri. Shivajrao Pandit.

=== Education ===
He expanded the scope of educational institutions founded by his father in the form of Jai Bhavani and Jagdamba Shikshan Prasarak Mandal, Beed. These institutions have imparted education to lakhs of students from rural area and help them to accomplish their dreams to live a successful life. Students from these institutions are successfully doing great work in the field of Medicine, Engineering, Education, Commerce and even in Civil services, etc. When it comes to sports, students of these institutions are representing the District, State and National Teams in various Sports.

=== Sharda Pratishthan ===
He established Sharda Pratishthan to carry out various social activities and programs. Sharda Pratishthan organizes mass wedding ceremonies every year under which thousands of couple has been married. Sharda Pratishthan organizes many arts, sports, educational and career guidance programs to provide a platform to the students of rural society where they showcase their talents, developing it into better future prospects. Sharda Pratishthan organized many Medical programs for people in need like Ophthalmology camp under the guidance of Padmashri Dr. Tatyasaheb Lahane, organized cancer diagnosis camp and started free counseling / facility center for cancer patients, blood donation camps, distribution of bicycles for disabled persons, ambulance services for the needful, it also served as a helping hand for hundreds of people affected due to corona pandemic, etc.

=== Recognition And Awards ===
Sharda Pratishthan recognizes and Awards the hard working and true teachers with Ideal Teacher Awards every year. Sharda Pratishthan awards special achievement people with cash prizes too. Among them notably are Mr. Saeed Chause (Maharashtra Kesari) and Commonwealth gold medalist Mr. Rahul Aware. Sharda Pratishthan has raised the standard of Georai Taluka Sports by organizing State Level Kabaddi Tournament, State Level Marathon Races. To Facilitate the farming society with modern technique and knowledge Sharda Pratishthan organizes State Level Agricultural as well as Animal Exhibition Programs. His work under the banner Sharda Pratishthan during the flood situation in Gevrai taluka in the year 2006 was unforgettable. He provided support to the disaster victims by providing all facilities including food and accommodation.

=== Visionary leadership ===
He brought thousands of crores of rupees funds for various development projects in the vicinity. Most prominently are web of construction of roads throughout the taluka. He contributed in the construction of various important government offices, Market committee, "Samajik Sabhagruha", Hospitals/Health centres, schools through Sarva Shiksha Abhiyan, construction of kitchen shed, water wells required in many schools. "Bharat Nirman Yojna" was implemented facilitating drinking water to many villages. He contributed in developing many substations of electricity throughout the taluka. He did remarkable work in the field of irrigation through various programs and activities. He brought hundreds and thousands of crores of funds for the construction and repair of Jayakwadi canal, for smaller lakes/ village lakes, smaller dams and construction of water wells across the taluka. Allotment of loans to women self-help groups and establishment of women's rooms by Damini Pratishthan. He implemented various Pilgrimage Development Scheme in Georai Taluka prominently for Rakshasbhuvan (Shaniche), Khamgaon, Panchaleshwar, etc.

== Major Contributions ==
=== Mass marriage ceremony, Organized by Sharda Pratishthan, Gevrai ===
| Sr.No. | Year | Date/Year | No of marriages |
|---|---|---|---|
| 1 | First | 02/05/1999 | 101 |
| 2 | Second | 2000 | 060 |
| 3 | Third | 18/04/2001 | 041 |
| 4 | Fourth | 07/04/2002 | 082 |
| 5 | Fifth | 21/04/2003 | 076 |
| 6 | Sixth | 22/04/2004 | 055 |
| 7 | Seven | 30/04/2005 | 092 |
| 8 | Eighth | 20/04/2006 | 058 |
| 9 | Ninth | 21/04/2007 | 064 |
| 10 | Tenth | 20/04/2008 | 035 |
| 11 | Eleventh | 01/05/2009 | 033 |
| 12 | Twelfth | 2010 | 044 |
| 13 | Thirteenth | 2011 | 036 |
| 14 | Fourteenth | 2012 | 033 |
| 15 | Fifteenth | 2013 | 080 |
| 16 | Sixteenth | 2014 | 031 |
| 17 | Seventeenth | 02/05/2015 | 045 |

Amarsingh Pandit got the credit of building about 1000 worlds through Pratishthan.

=== Amarsingh Pandit's efforts in flood in Gevrai taluka ===
1. During the period from 7 to 14 August 2006, excess water from Nath Sagar was released into the Godavari river basin resulting in flood situation.
2. To provide relief to the flood victims, Amar Singh Pandit established 11 relief centers through Sharda Pratishthan and arranged accommodation and food for thousands of flood victims.
3. He raised the following starred questions in the Legislative Assembly for government assistance and rehabilitation of the flood victims.
  1. STARRED QUESTION NO. 67339 dated 28/12/2006
  2. STARRED QUESTION NO. 70003 dated 15/10/2007
  3. STARRED QUESTION NO. 86107 dated 19/03/2008
  4. Starred Question no. 86825 dated 31/03/2008
  5. STARRED QUESTION NO. 93966 dated 16/07/2008
4. After August 2006, Amarsingh Pandit tried to solve the problems of the flood victims by presenting the discussion through starred questions, half-hour discussion, attention and adjournment proposals.
5. Regarding the erosion and erosion of 356.70 hectares of land in 11 villages of Gevrai taluka and the fact that this land became barren, special efforts were made to get government assistance of Rs. The Government was compelled to take the decision of CLS 1107/Pracr 220 (M-3)/dated 28/11/2007. Follow up to the administration through several reminders from 04/12/2007 till date to take action as per the said government decision.
6. Continuous follow-up with the Rehabilitation Department to survey the villages in the purresha of Godakath in Gevrai taluka and draw a new outline and rehabilitate the villages in the purresha. As a result of this follow up on 10/03/2008 the Collector, Beed sent a proposal for rehabilitation to the Divisional Commissioner, Aurangabad.
7. Special efforts were made to get compensation for the crops and orchards of the damaged farmers in 42 flood-affected villages in Gevrai taluka. During the period from 05/10/2007 to 06/02/2008 several reminders were sent to the Principal Secretary, Divisional Commissioner and Agriculture Commissioner. In this regard the Collector, Beed sent a proposal to the Commissioner of Agriculture, Pune on 03/11/2007. As the said proposal was incomplete, this proposal was again sent to the Commissioner of Agriculture on 08/03/2008 with correction of errors.
8. On 1 May 2007, hunger strike and several protests in front of the Collectorate regarding the issues of the flood victims.
9. Follow up through several reminders to the Principal Secretary and Divisional Commissioner to inquire into the inexcusable delay and laxity of the administration in distribution of relief to the flood victims. Finally the Principal Secretary, Relief and Rehabilitation Department vide his letter no. An inquiry was ordered under CLS 2008/Chapter 208(M-3)/dated 29/02/2008.
10. In the budget session 2008 and during the current monsoon session, special efforts were made to bring this issue to the discussion by using many starred questions and various weapons to help the flood victims.

=== The relief work done by Sarada Pratishthan in the pristine condition of Godakath in Gevrai Taluka ===
On 6 August 2006, excess water from the dam was released from the Nath Sagar of Paithan into the Godavari River basin. Sharda Pratishthan, a voluntary organization headed by Amarsingh Pandit in the morning on 7 August, prepared to help the flood victims before the district administration.

On 7 August 2006 at 9 am, Amarsingh Pandit contacted the District Collector and made them aware of the seriousness of the crisis facing the villages of Godakath in Gevrai Taluka. After calling a meeting in the Tehsil office and giving appropriate instructions to the Tehsildar and concerned officials, Amarsinghani organized a meeting of all the volunteers of his Sharda Pratishthan on the same day at 10:30 am. In just one hour after calling the office of the foundation, all the systems of the foundation were prepared to help the flood victims.

From the first days, it was decided to start relief centers at Rampuri, Talwara, Bagpimpalgaon (Jaikwadi Colony), Malegaon, Daithan, Savleshwar and Rakshasbhuvan and accordingly action was taken on war footing. 5 pm There was 1,73,601 cusecs of water in the riverbed, the flood had turned into a deluge, the villagers of Godakath were terrified and were not ready to leave the village. In such a situation, Amarsingh Pandit and his colleagues were on one hand requesting the villagers to go to the relief center outside the village, while at the same time the volunteers of the foundation were taking the rations and food materials to the relief center by whatever vehicle they could find, while the volunteers of the foundation were arranging dinner for the people at the 7th center. The center heads of all the centers were in touch with the Amarsihs and kept an eye on every minute detail.

On 8 August 2006, there was an increase in the number of flood victims at the foundation's center, at the Sharda Foundation's relief center in Rampuri, the foundation's volunteers were engaged in arranging flood-affected women and men from Deshmukhwadi, Dhalegaon, Gopatqpapalgaon, Shripatantarwala and Tapenimgaon. At the relief center in Talwada, there were very few flood victims, but food was prepared and sent to the flood victims of Golegaon, Kathoda and Rajapur villages from this place. After coming to the relief center of Pratishthan at Daithan for flood-affected food in Pangulgaon, Sangam Jalgaon, Gondi, Mirgaon, and Hingangaon, we used to sit near the water near the village taking care of our houses. The flood victims from Nagzhari and Agarnandur were getting crowded at the relief center at Bagpimpalgaon Vasahat. Since the Zilla Parishad primary school building there started to fall down, the volunteers of the foundation requested the Jayakwadi administration to make available the empty houses in the colony for the flood victims. The workers of the foundation made arrangements to send food to the flood victims of Surlegaon, Gulj, Patharwala and Panchaleshwar from the relief center at Malegaon. In the relief center at Rakshasabhuvan, the food system collapsed due to the intrusion of flood water in the evening. Finally, the workers of the foundation prepared the pockets of food and delivered it to the flood victims under the leadership of Bhausaheb Natkar, the chairman of the K.U.B.Samithi.

On 9 August 2006, at 12 noon, the Godavari river reached its peak and released 2,77,875 cusecs of water, causing havoc in all parts of Chohobaju as 8 villages of Godakath in Gevrai taluka were cut off. Kuranpimpri, Borgaon, Panchaleshwar, Rakshasbhuvan, Mhalas Pimpalgaon, Sawleshwar Khamgaon, Agranandur, Nagzari, Pangulgaon, Rajapur, Borgaon Thadi, Bhogalgaon, Sripatantarwala, Tape Nimgaon, Raheri, Surlegaon, Kathoda were displaced to the relief center. Amarsingh Pandit and his colleagues were visiting villages to ensure that no one was trapped in the water and taking precautions to reach everyone. Even in this situation, Pandit and his colleagues were actively working to provide relief to the flood victims through Sharda Pratishthan.

At Borgaon, 20 volunteers of the Foundation lost contact with 1,200 flood victims as the road leading to Malega was under water. At that time, with the cooperation of the administration, the flood victims were brought there through Bodhegaon in Ahmednagar district through the logistics establishment. The number of relief centers run by Sarada Pratishthan has now increased to 11.

Dated 10 August 2006 As the water level in the Godavari basin was increasing, an atmosphere of fear was spreading among the villagers of Godakath. Terrified people flocked to the shelter of the Pratishthan's relief centre. There, 229 volunteers of the foundation were tirelessly serving the flood victims. A health team was established by the Health Department of the Zilla Parishad at the 11 relief centers run by the Foundation and the flood victims were being treated there. The foundation was providing food to 17,533 flood victims through 11 relief centers. A separate control room was established at Gevrai for this purpose. 5 vehicles were arranged through Pratishthan to transport food materials. 3793 at Rampuri Relief Centre, 700 at Golegaon, 1250 at Talwada Relief Centre, 1242 at Daithan Centre, 1648 at Bagqpapalgaon Colony, 2200 at Malegaon Centre, 4200 at Borgaon Centre, 1000 at Rakshasbhuvan, 700 at Sawleshwar, 600 at Umapur Centre, 600 at Nagzari Centre. 200 Like this, a total of 17533 flood victims were provided food by Sharda Pratishthan.

On 13 August 2006, between 11 August and 13 August, the water in the Godavari river basin crossed the limit of 3 lakh cusecs and recorded the highest ever flood. From the night of 13th, however, the level of the deluge began to recede, as the flood victims gave up hope of relief. The work of the foundation was appreciated by the flood victims, the volunteers of Sharda Foundation did not commit any fault till the end in the service of the flood victims.

=== Assistance from Sarada Foundation at various centers ===
10 quintal wheat, 6 quintal rice, 2 quintal gara, gram flour 1.50 quintal, oil 60 kg, chili 25 kg, turmeric 5 kg, cumin 5 kg, salt 40 kg, sugar 1 quintal, ghee 15 kg, pot Plate 11 thousand and 6 gas tanks

10 quintals of wheat, 6 quintals of rice, 1 quintals of gara, 1 quintals of gram flour, 55 kgs of oil, 25 kgs of chillies, 5 kgs of turmeric, 5 kgs of cumin seeds, 55 kgs of salt, 1 quintals of sugar, 15 kgs of ghee, 10,000 serving plates at Malegaon Center, 8 gas tank.

At Bagpimpalgaon settlement center, wheat 10 quintals, rice 6 quintals, gara 1 quintal, gram flour 1.50 quintals, oil 85 kg, chili 45 kg, turmeric 7 kg, cumin 7 kg, salt 40 kg, sugar 1.50 quintal, ghee 20 kg., vessel plate 11 thousand and 8 gas tank.

At the center at Rakshasabhuvan, wheat 4 quintals, rice 4 quintals, gara 2 quintals, gram flour 50 kg, oil 20 kg, chillies 10 kg, turmeric 2 kg, cumin 2 kg, salt 15 kg, sugar 1 quintal, ghee 15 kg and pot plate 1 a thousand
