= Kandivali Assembly constituency =

Constituency of the Maharashtra legislative assembly in India

Kandivali
- Former constituency for the Maharashtra Legislative Assembly

Constituency details
- Country: India
- Region: Western India
- State: Maharashtra
- Established: 1978
- Abolished: 2008
- Total electors: 499,198

Kandivali Assembly constituency was an assembly constituency in the India state of Maharashtra.

== Members of the Legislative Assembly ==
Election	Member	Party
1978	Upadhyaya Hasmukhbhai Vasantray	Janata Party
1980	A. K. Shah	Indian National Congress
1985	Chandrakant Gosalia	Indian National Congress
1990	Chandrakant Gosalia	Indian National Congress
1995	Madhav Marathe	Bharatiya Janata Party
1999	Pradhuman Umiyashankar Mehta	Indian National Congress
2004	Pradhuman Umiyashankar Mehta	Indian National Congress

== Election results ==
=== Assembly Election 2004 ===
2004 Maharashtra Legislative Assembly election : Kandivali
Party	Candidate	Votes	%	±%
INC	P. U. Mehta	107,851	48.73%	▲0.50
BJP	Jai Prakash Thakur	93,731	42.35%	▼4.46
SP	Shaikh Aslam Ramzan Ali	11,722	5.30%	New
BSP	Jagdish Badole	2,803	1.27%	▲0.74
Lok Rajya Party	Kondvilkar Sandesh Laxman	1,774	0.80%	New
Independent	Salma Salim Almelkar	1,519	0.69%	New
Margin of victory		14,120	6.38%	▲4.96
Turnout		221,323	44.33%	▲5.84
Registered electors		499,198		▲16.48
INC hold		Swing	▲0.50	

=== Assembly Election 1999 ===
1999 Maharashtra Legislative Assembly election : Kandivali
Party	Candidate	Votes	%	±%
INC	Mehta Pradhuman Umiyashankar	79,560	48.23%	▲11.00
BJP	Jaiprakash Thakur	77,222	46.81%	▲1.69
Independent	Ashok Sambhaji Kasavkar	1,763	1.07%	New
Margin of victory		2,338	1.42%	▼6.47
Turnout		164,971	37.51%	▼11.91
Registered electors		428,579		▲6.51
INC gain from BJP		Swing	▲3.11	

=== Assembly Election 1995 ===
1995 Maharashtra Legislative Assembly election : Kandivali
Party	Candidate	Votes	%	±%
BJP	Madhav Marathe	91,511	45.12%	▲14.44
INC	Chandrakant Gosalia	75,510	37.23%	▼2.60
SP	Yadav Girjashankar Mohanlal	16,864	8.32%	New
JD	Soni Thakur Prasad	3,955	1.95%	▼22.89
JP	Shivprasad Ramji Soni	2,414	1.19%	▲0.90
Independent	Gotecha Shirish Dwarkadas	1,874	0.92%	New
Independent	Narender Singh Avtar Singh Bakshi	1,561	0.77%	New
Margin of victory		16,001	7.89%	▼1.26
Turnout		202,813	49.56%	▲2.30
Registered electors		402,379		▲46.20
BJP gain from INC		Swing	▲5.29	

=== Assembly Election 1990 ===
1990 Maharashtra Legislative Assembly election : Kandivali
Party	Candidate	Votes	%	±%
INC	Chandrakant Gosalia	52,725	39.83%	▼11.10
BJP	Ratnakar Kamat	40,618	30.68%	New
JD	Bhagwatibhai Navnitlal Shroff	32,880	24.84%	New
DMM	Choudhary Razzak Chane	1,966	1.49%	New
Margin of victory		12,107	9.15%	▼10.97
Turnout		132,378	47.50%	▲6.40
Registered electors		275,220		▲47.36
INC hold		Swing	▼11.10	

=== Assembly Election 1985 ===
1985 Maharashtra Legislative Assembly election : Kandivali
Party	Candidate	Votes	%	±%
INC	Chandrakant Gosalia	39,662	50.93%	New
JP	Hansmukh Vasantrai Upadhyay	23,993	30.81%	▲7.85
Independent	Avinash Govind Mohite	6,195	7.96%	New
Independent	Shaikh Tajmohamed Ibrahim	4,672	6.00%	New
LKD	Lalai Ramdeo Yadav	1,641	2.11%	New
Margin of victory		15,669	20.12%	▲14.53
Turnout		77,875	41.07%	▲7.70
Registered electors		186,764		▲23.55
INC gain from INC(I)		Swing	▲12.47	

=== Assembly Election 1980 ===
1980 Maharashtra Legislative Assembly election : Kandivali
Party	Candidate	Votes	%	±%
INC(I)	A. K. Shah	19,763	38.46%	New
BJP	M. M. Mehta	16,892	32.87%	New
JP	H. V. Upadhyaya	11,800	22.96%	▼53.18
Independent	N. D. Parmar	1,342	2.61%	New
[[Janata Party (Secular) Charan Singh|Janata Party (Secular) Charan Singh]]	K. B. Gupta	412	0.80%	New
Margin of victory		2,871	5.59%	▼50.86
Turnout		51,389	33.59%	▼15.54
Registered electors		151,161		▲8.69
INC(I) gain from JP		Swing	▼37.68	

=== Assembly Election 1978 ===
1978 Maharashtra Legislative Assembly election : Kandivali
Party	Candidate	Votes	%	±%
JP	Upadhyaya Hasmukhbhai Vasantray	52,446	76.14%	New
INC	Suryakant Matliya	13,565	19.69%	New
Independent	Leo Andrew Rabello	1,643	2.39%	New
Margin of victory		38,881	56.44%	
Turnout		68,883	48.65%	
Registered electors		139,069		
JP win (new seat)				
