= Bopodi Assembly constituency =

Former constituency of the Maharashtra legislative assembly in India

Bopodi
- Former constituency No. 246 for the Maharashtra Legislative Assembly

Constituency details
- Country: India
- Region: Western India
- State: Maharashtra
- District: Pune
- Established: 1978
- Abolished: 2008

Bopodi Vidhan Sabha seat was one of the constituencies of Maharashtra Vidhan Sabha, in India. Bopodi seat existed until the 2004 elections after which it was abolished in 2008.

== Members of Vidhan Sabha ==
Year	Member	Party
Till 1978: Constituency did not exist
1978	L. T. Sawant	Independent
1980	Shashikant Kadam	Indian National Congress (I)
1985	Rambhau Moze	Indian Congress (Socialist)
1990	Rambhau Moze	Indian National Congress
1995	Rambhau Moze	Indian National Congress
1999	Chandrakant Chhajed	Indian National Congress
2004	Chandrakant Chhajed	Indian National Congress
2008 onwards: Constituency defunct

== Election results ==
=== Assembly Election 2004 ===
2004 Maharashtra Legislative Assembly election : Bopodi
Party	Candidate	Votes	%	±%
INC	Adv. Chandrakant Chhajed	47,534	45.47%	▲3.40
BJP	Aba Alias Prabhakar Sadashiv Nikam	34,524	33.03%	▲8.39
BSP	Bhante Rajratan	4,263	4.08%	▲3.06
Margin of victory		13,010	12.45%	▲1.42
Turnout		104,530	43.19%	▼7.04
Total valid votes		104,530		
Registered electors		242,028		▲27.62
INC hold		Swing	▲3.40	

=== Assembly Election 1999 ===
1999 Maharashtra Legislative Assembly election : Bopodi
Party	Candidate	Votes	%	±%
INC	Adv. Chandrakant Chhajed	39,185	42.07%	▼0.17
NCP	Rambhau Genba Moze	28,919	31.05%	New
BJP	Anil Shirole	22,943	24.63%	▲2.65
BSP	Nagesh Rajaram Chabookswar	945	1.01%	▲0.57
Independent	Avichal Nivrutti Dhiwar	625	0.67%	New
Margin of victory		10,266	11.02%	▼6.55
Turnout		95,262	50.23%	▼17.62
Total valid votes		93,132		
Registered electors		189,645		▲5.77
INC hold		Swing	▼0.17	

=== Assembly Election 1995 ===
1995 Maharashtra Legislative Assembly election : Bopodi
Party	Candidate	Votes	%	±%
INC	Rambhau Genba Moze	51,393	42.25%	▼24.62
BBM	Gaikwad Jaidev Marutrao	30,011	24.67%	New
BJP	Rathod Vikram Walchand	26,743	21.98%	▲7.97
Independent	Sawant Baliram Bapu	8,370	6.88%	New
Independent	Brig. Vijay Ramchandra Dani (Retd.)	1,186	0.97%	New
Independent	Tadakhe Shankar Hari	886	0.73%	New
Margin of victory		21,382	17.58%	▼35.28
Turnout		123,333	68.79%	▲14.43
Total valid votes		121,651		
Registered electors		179,295		▲16.95
INC hold		Swing	▼24.62	

=== Assembly Election 1990 ===
1990 Maharashtra Legislative Assembly election : Bopodi
Party	Candidate	Votes	%	±%
INC	Rambhau Genba Moze	54,762	66.87%	▲31.35
BJP	Patole Balasaheb Shankar	11,473	14.01%	New
BRP	Salvae Vasant Haribhau	9,412	11.49%	New
JD	Madhukar Niraphrake	4,091	5.00%	New
INS(SCS)	Lakka Laxman Naganna	681	0.83%	New
Independent	Tadakhe Shankar Hari	590	0.72%	New
Margin of victory		43,289	52.86%	▲36.44
Turnout		82,738	53.97%	▼4.87
Total valid votes		81,896		
Registered electors		153,313		▲38.02
INC gain from IC(S)		Swing	▲14.93	

=== Assembly Election 1985 ===
1985 Maharashtra Legislative Assembly election : Bopodi
Party	Candidate	Votes	%	±%
IC(S)	Rambhau Genba Moze	33,625	51.94%	New
INC	Sawant B. B.	22,997	35.52%	New
Independent	Jaghav Murlidhar	4,630	7.15%	New
Independent	Sonkamble L. S.	1,145	1.77%	New
Independent	Lacka Laxman, N	825	1.27%	New
Independent	Anthony Rananware	510	0.79%	New
Margin of victory		10,628	16.42%	▼7.63
Turnout		65,479	58.95%	▲8.68
Total valid votes		64,744		
Registered electors		111,084		▲12.53
IC(S) gain from INC(I)		Swing	▲3.42	

=== Assembly Election 1980 ===
1980 Maharashtra Legislative Assembly election : Bopodi
Party	Candidate	Votes	%	±%
INC(I)	Kadam Shashikant Rajaram	23,751	48.51%	▲13.54
INC(U)	Bhosale Shivajirao Jagannathrao	11,980	24.47%	New
RPI(K)	Mane Vishu Shankar	5,604	11.45%	New
Independent	Sawant L. T.	3,638	7.43%	New
BJP	Vasant Wani	3,498	7.14%	New
Margin of victory		11,771	24.04%	▲17.84
Turnout		49,677	50.33%	▼10.60
Total valid votes		48,960		
Registered electors		98,711		▲12.50
INC(I) gain from Independent		Swing	▲7.33	

=== Assembly Election 1978 ===
1978 Maharashtra Legislative Assembly election : Bopodi
Party	Candidate	Votes	%	±%
Independent	L. T. Sawant	21,750	41.18%	New
INC(I)	Kadam Shashikant Rajaram	18,473	34.97%	New
RPI	Sonaba Anaji Alias Bhausaheb Chavan	9,071	17.17%	New
Independent	Kakade Sahebrao Kashinath	1,078	2.04%	New
Independent	Premchand Sadiram Agarwal	701	1.33%	New
Independent	Chavan Sanjiv Govind	559	1.06%	New
Independent	Agarwal Ashokkumar Kapurchand	380	0.72%	New
Margin of victory		3,277	6.20%	
Turnout		53,782	61.29%	
Total valid votes		52,821		
Registered electors		87,743		
Independent win (new seat)				

== See also ==
- List of constituencies of Maharashtra Legislative Assembly
