= Lakhandur Assembly constituency =

Constituency of the Maharashtra legislative assembly in India

Lakhandur
- Former constituency for the Maharashtra Legislative Assembly

Constituency details
- Country: India
- Region: Western India
- State: Maharashtra
- Established: 1978
- Abolished: 2008
- Total electors: 1,94,719

Lakhandur Assembly constituency was an assembly constituency in the India state of Maharashtra.

== Members of the Legislative Assembly ==
Election	Member	Party
1952	Krishnarao Dagoji Thakur	Indian National Congress
1978	Bhaiyya Hiralal Nathmalji	Indian National Congress
1980	Bhaiyya Hiralal Nathmalji	Indian National Congress
1985	Diwathe Namdeo Harbaji	Bharatiya Janata Party
1990	Diwathe Namdeo Harbaji	Bharatiya Janata Party
1995	Kapgate Dayaram Maroti	Bharatiya Janata Party
1999	Nanabhau Falgunrao Patole	Indian National Congress
2004	Nanabhau Falgunrao Patole	Indian National Congress

== Election results ==
=== Assembly Election 2004 ===
2004 Maharashtra Legislative Assembly election : Lakhandur
Party	Candidate	Votes	%	±%
INC	Patole Nanabhau Falgunrao	85,593	53.87%	▲6.31
BJP	Kapgate Dayaram Maroti	43,833	27.59%	▼7.74
BSP	Sureshbhau Asaram Bramhankar	18,363	11.56%	▲11.05
BBM	Dongare Ramesh Dayaram	4,615	2.90%	▲1.31
Peoples Republican Party	Lade Vijaykumar Gopala	2,425	1.53%	New
Independent	Vyankat Amrut Meshram	2,040	1.28%	New
Independent	Jambhulkar Gyaniram Martand	1,298	0.82%	New
Margin of victory		41,760	26.28%	▲14.05
Turnout		158,889	81.60%	▲1.12
Total valid votes		158,879		
Registered electors		194,719		▲12.40
INC hold		Swing	▲6.31	

=== Assembly Election 1999 ===
1999 Maharashtra Legislative Assembly election : Lakhandur
Party	Candidate	Votes	%	±%
INC	Patole Nanabhau Falgunrao	63,273	47.56%	▲28.18
BJP	Kapgate Dayaram Maroti	47,007	35.33%	▲12.18
NCP	Lanje Gopinath Sadashio	11,204	8.42%	New
Independent	Meshram Laxman Shioram	6,797	5.11%	New
BBM	Ramteke Kabirdas Saoji	2,119	1.59%	New
GGP	Pandhare Rekhatai Mansaram	1,088	0.82%	New
Margin of victory		16,266	12.23%	▲8.46
Turnout		139,417	80.48%	▼7.11
Total valid votes		133,047		
Registered electors		173,236		▼1.34
INC gain from BJP		Swing	▲24.41	

=== Assembly Election 1995 ===
1995 Maharashtra Legislative Assembly election : Lakhandur
Party	Candidate	Votes	%	±%
BJP	Kapgate Dayaram Maroti	34,833	23.15%	▼11.87
INC	Kute Pramila Premraj	29,159	19.38%	▼8.99
Independent	Ramteke Kabirdas Saoji	27,451	18.25%	New
Independent	Patole Nanabhau Falgunrao	19,948	13.26%	New
Independent	Nakade Gopal Tikaram	11,849	7.88%	New
Independent	Salame Mahadeo Saoji	10,335	6.87%	New
Independent	Thakare Homraj Atmaram	9,439	6.27%	New
Independent	Lonare Abhiman Ganesh	1,528	1.02%	New
Margin of victory		5,674	3.77%	▼2.88
Turnout		153,793	87.59%	▲14.51
Total valid votes		150,436		
Registered electors		175,592		▲9.82
BJP hold		Swing	▼11.87	

=== Assembly Election 1990 ===
1990 Maharashtra Legislative Assembly election : Lakhandur
Party	Candidate	Votes	%	±%
BJP	Diwathe Namdeo Harbaji	40,504	35.02%	▼16.02
INC	Ramchandra Maroti Thakre	32,808	28.37%	▼0.32
RPI(K)	Dahiwale Sukhdeo Kumar Naktuji	16,416	14.19%	▼3.15
Independent	Salame Mahadeo Saoji	6,762	5.85%	New
Independent	Keshao Sitaram Mandwatkar	3,462	2.99%	New
Independent	Thakre Manohar Govinda	3,164	2.74%	New
BSP	Hemne Leeladhar Shankar	2,711	2.34%	New
JD	Anna Alias Yadorao Bhiwaji Raut	2,134	1.85%	New
Margin of victory		7,696	6.65%	▼15.69
Turnout		116,847	73.08%	▼0.34
Total valid votes		115,658		
Registered electors		159,884		▲21.84
BJP hold		Swing	▼16.02	

=== Assembly Election 1985 ===
1985 Maharashtra Legislative Assembly election : Lakhandur
Party	Candidate	Votes	%	±%
BJP	Diwathe Namdeo Harbaji	48,509	51.04%	▲17.48
INC	Hiralal Nathamalji Bhiyya	27,274	28.69%	New
RPI(K)	Gaybhiye Wamanrao Gopinath	16,480	17.34%	▼4.20
Independent	Govindrao Krishnaji Brahmankar	1,813	1.91%	New
Margin of victory		21,235	22.34%	▲18.46
Turnout		96,341	73.42%	▲13.24
Total valid votes		95,049		
Registered electors		131,221		▲7.18
BJP gain from INC(I)		Swing	▲13.61	

=== Assembly Election 1980 ===
1980 Maharashtra Legislative Assembly election : Lakhandur
Party	Candidate	Votes	%	±%
INC(I)	Bhaiyya Hiralal Nathmalji	27,049	37.43%	▼5.91
BJP	Diwathe Namdeo Harbaji	24,247	33.56%	New
RPI(K)	Ramteke Kewalram Donu	15,567	21.54%	New
INC(U)	Thakre Ramchandra Maroti	4,011	5.55%	New
Independent	Uikey Modku Kashiram	830	1.15%	New
Independent	Khobragade Krushna Taliram	553	0.77%	New
Margin of victory		2,802	3.88%	▼1.30
Turnout		73,673	60.18%	▼18.56
Total valid votes		72,257		
Registered electors		122,425		▲6.62
INC(I) hold		Swing	▼5.91	

=== Assembly Election 1978 ===
1978 Maharashtra Legislative Assembly election : Lakhandur
Party	Candidate	Votes	%	±%
INC(I)	Bhaiyya Hiralal Nathmalji	38,157	43.34%	New
JP	Diwathe Namdeo Harbaji	33,595	38.16%	New
INC	Bramhankar Bhaskarrao Martandrao	9,271	10.53%	▼39.79
Independent	Neware Narayan Nathuji	4,458	5.06%	New
Independent	Parmar Devicharansinh Jairamsinh	1,304	1.48%	New
Independent	Gajbhiye Udebhan Dayaram	749	0.85%	New
Margin of victory		4,562	5.18%	▲1.83
Turnout		90,418	78.74%	▼40.28
Total valid votes		88,041		
Registered electors		114,826		▲16.73
INC(I) gain from INC		Swing	▲16.51	

=== Assembly Election 1952 ===
1952 Hyderabad State Legislative Assembly election : Lakhandur
Party	Candidate	Votes	%	±%
INC	Krishnarao Dagoji Thakur	31,417	26.83%	New
INC	Sitaram Jairam Bhambore	27,500	23.49%	New
Socialist	Krishnaji Ganpat Raoot	16,050	13.71%	New
SCF	Dinkar Modku Rahate	15,442	13.19%	New
Independent	Ramcharansingh Jamalsingh Pawar	5,905	5.04%	New
Independent	Krishnarao Shankarrao Chitnavis	5,388	4.60%	New
Independent	Janardhan Biju Gonnade	4,566	3.90%	New
KMPP	Tima Dhokale Gajbhaiya	2,511	2.14%	New
Independent	Narayan Languduji Ramteke	2,126	1.82%	New
Independent	Tatyaji Domaji Meshram	2,046	1.75%	New
Margin of victory		3,917	3.35%	
Turnout		117,078	119.02%	
Total valid votes		117,078		
Registered electors		98,370		
INC win (new seat)				
