= Her Assembly constituency =

Constituency of the Maharashtra legislative assembly in India

Her
- Former constituency for the Maharashtra Legislative Assembly

Constituency details
- Country: India
- Region: Western India
- State: Maharashtra
- Established: 1978
- Abolished: 2008
- Total electors: 166,160

Her Assembly constituency was an assembly constituency in the India state of Maharashtra.

== Members of the Legislative Assembly ==
Election	Member	Party
1978	Kamble Trimbak Pandurang	Independent politician
1980	Kamble Arvind Tulsiram	Indian National Congress
1985	Dharmaraj Girjappa Sonkawade	Indian National Congress
1990	Tondchirkar Shivraj Maloji	Janata Dal
1995	Gundile Ram Sambhajirao	Bharatiya Janata Party
1999	Navandiokar Ramchandra Piraji	Bharatiya Janata Party
2004	Kamble Trimbak Pandurang	Bharatiya Janata Party

== Election results ==
=== Assembly Election 2004 ===
2004 Maharashtra Legislative Assembly election : Her
Party	Candidate	Votes	%	±%
BJP	Kamble Trimbak Pandurang	45,058	39.21%	▼4.26
INC	Prof.Ramkishan Bhimrao Sonkamble	43,588	37.93%	▲12.09
BSP	Viveki Ramesh Bhagwatrao	6,763	5.88%	New
Independent	Bhalerao Sudhakar Sangram	6,757	5.88%	New
Independent	Dharmaraj Girjappa Sonkawade	2,633	2.29%	New
JSS	Kaknate Dinkar Govindrao	1,888	1.64%	New
Independent	Waghmare Haribhau Krishnaji	1,589	1.38%	New
Margin of victory		1,470	1.28%	▼16.36
Turnout		114,921	69.15%	▼2.23
Registered electors		166,160		▲20.18
BJP hold		Swing	▼4.26	

=== Assembly Election 1999 ===
1999 Maharashtra Legislative Assembly election : Her
Party	Candidate	Votes	%	±%
BJP	Navandiokar Ramchandra Piraji	42,908	43.47%	▲4.36
INC	Kamble Trimbak Mukundrao	25,500	25.83%	▲10.26
SP	Trimukhe Suresh Narsingrao	13,442	13.62%	New
Independent	Sonkawade Dharmraj Girjappa	3,712	3.76%	New
Independent	Gundile Ram Sambhajirao	3,577	3.62%	New
Independent	Patil Avinash Madhav	1,336	1.35%	New
Independent	Kamble Trimbak Zetinga	766	0.78%	New
Margin of victory		17,408	17.64%	▼5.90
Turnout		98,704	67.52%	▼10.61
Registered electors		138,256		▲6.84
BJP hold		Swing	▲4.36	

=== Assembly Election 1995 ===
1995 Maharashtra Legislative Assembly election : Her
Party	Candidate	Votes	%	±%
BJP	Gundile Ram Sambhajirao	41,499	39.11%	▲24.20
INC	Kamble Trimbak Mukundrao	16,528	15.58%	▼14.80
Independent	Tondchirkar Shivraj Maloji	8,999	8.48%	New
Independent	Swami Vijaykumar Mallikarjun	8,311	7.83%	New
JD	Nabde Anil Prabhakar	7,106	6.70%	▼31.29
Independent	Suryawanshi Vijayprakash Vithoba	4,446	4.19%	New
BSP	Kamble Trimbak Pandurang	2,847	2.68%	New
Margin of victory		24,971	23.53%	▲15.93
Turnout		106,109	80.39%	▲23.55
Registered electors		129,402		▼3.30
BJP gain from JD		Swing	▲1.13	

=== Assembly Election 1990 ===
1990 Maharashtra Legislative Assembly election : Her
Party	Candidate	Votes	%	±%
JD	Tondchirkar Shivraj Maloji	29,706	37.98%	New
INC	Dharmaraj Girjappa Sonkawade	23,756	30.38%	▼17.18
BJP	Ganpatrao Kamaji Sabane	11,660	14.91%	New
Independent	Avinash Madhavrao Bolegave	2,495	3.19%	New
Independent	Trimbak Maroti Kochewad	2,056	2.63%	New
Independent	Syed Hussain Munna Mohammed Sab Madari	1,942	2.48%	New
Independent	Kamble Trimbak Pandurang	1,167	1.49%	New
Margin of victory		5,950	7.61%	▼1.77
Turnout		78,209	57.39%	▲5.23
Registered electors		133,816		▲23.26
JD gain from INC		Swing	▼9.57	

=== Assembly Election 1985 ===
1985 Maharashtra Legislative Assembly election : Her
Party	Candidate	Votes	%	±%
INC	Dharmaraj Girjappa Sonkawade	27,474	47.56%	New
JP	Kamble Trimbak Pandurang	22,057	38.18%	▲6.94
Independent	Suresh Narsingrao Trimukhe	4,043	7.00%	New
Independent	Padmawati Sambhajirao Shelhalkar	690	1.19%	New
RPI	Sutar Narsingrao Mareappa	674	1.17%	▼0.23
Independent	Kolle Gurlingappa Manmathappa	571	0.99%	New
Independent	Laxman Rama Srinagare	457	0.79%	New
Margin of victory		5,417	9.38%	▲1.90
Turnout		57,772	52.36%	▲4.09
Registered electors		108,561		▲11.83
INC gain from INC(I)		Swing	▲8.84	

=== Assembly Election 1980 ===
1980 Maharashtra Legislative Assembly election : Her
Party	Candidate	Votes	%	±%
INC(I)	Kamble Arvind Tulsiram	18,464	38.72%	▲18.61
JP	Kamble Trimbak Pandurang	14,899	31.24%	New
INC(U)	Suryawanshi Maroti Narsing	11,110	23.30%	New
Independent	Khadiwala Vithalrao Bapurao	1,005	2.11%	New
[[Janata Party (Secular) Charan Singh|Janata Party (Secular) Charan Singh]]	Sunita Dilip Arllikar	680	1.43%	New
RPI	Bhale Govindrao Balaji	665	1.39%	New
Margin of victory		3,565	7.48%	▲5.35
Turnout		47,687	48.23%	▼5.58
Registered electors		97,075		▲5.75
INC(I) gain from Independent		Swing	▲10.14	

=== Assembly Election 1978 ===
1978 Maharashtra Legislative Assembly election : Her
Party	Candidate	Votes	%	±%
Independent	Kamble Trimbak Pandurang	14,351	28.58%	New
INC	Khadiwale Vithalrao Bapurao	13,284	26.45%	New
INC(I)	Sonkamble Gopal Shahkar	10,098	20.11%	New
Independent	Sonkawade Dharmraj Girjappa	3,516	7.00%	New
Independent	Sutar Narsingrao Mareappa	2,951	5.88%	New
Independent	Kamble Nilkanth Hulaji	2,340	4.66%	New
Independent	Kamble Sangram Rama	608	1.21%	New
Margin of victory		1,067	2.12%	
Turnout		50,215	53.11%	
Registered electors		91,796		
Independent win (new seat)				
