= 1980 Maharashtra Legislative Assembly election =

Indian state election

- 28, 31 May 1980

All 288 seats in the Maharashtra Legislative Assembly 144 seats needed for a majority
- Turnout: 53.30% (▼14.29%)

	Majority party	Minority party
Leader	A. R. Antulay	Sharad Pawar
Party	INC(I)	INC(U)
Last election	62 seats	New Party
Seats won	186	47
Seat change	▲124	▲47
Popular vote	7,809,533	3,596,582
Percentage	44.50%	20.49%
Swing	▲26.16%	New Party
Chief Minister before election
President's Rule
Elected Chief Minister
Abdul Rehman Antulay
INC(I)

The 1980 Maharashtra State Assembly election was held in July 1980. A total of 288 seats were contested.

== List of participating political parties ==
Party	Abbreviation
National Parties
Bharatiya Janata Party	BJP
Indian National Congress (Urs)	INC(U)
Indian National Congress (Indira)	INC(I)
Janata Party	JP
Janata Party (Secular)-Ch. Charan Singh	JP(SC)
Janata Party (Secular)-Raj Narain	JP(SR)
Communist Party of India (Marxist)	CPM
Communist Party of India	CPI
State Parties
Indian Union Muslim League	IUML
Peasants and Workers Party	PWP
All India Forward Bloc	AIFB
Registered (Unrecognised) Parties
Republican Party of India	RPI
Republican Party of India (Khobragade)	RPI(K)

== Results ==
The Indian National Congress (Indira) got a clear majority, winning 186 seats, when 144 were required for a simple majority. Abdul Rehman Antulay became Chief Minister, Sharad Shankar Dighe became Speaker, and Sharad Pawar became leader of the opposition.

Summary of results of the Maharashtra State Assembly election, 1980
Political Party	Candidates	Seats won	Seat +/-	Votes	Vote %	Vote % +/-
Indian National Congress (Indira) 186 / 288 (65%)	286	186	▲124	7,809,533	44.50%	▲26.16%
Indian National Congress (Urs) 47 / 288 (16%)	192	47	▼22 (from INC seats)	3,596,582	20.49%	▼4.84% (from INC vote share)
Janata Party 17 / 288 (6%)	111	17	▼82	1,511,042	8.61%	▼19.38%
Bharatiya Janata Party 14 / 288 (5%)	145	14	▲14	1,645,734	9.38%	▲9.38% (New Party)
Peasants and Workers Party of India 9 / 288 (3%)	41	9	▼4	726,338	4.14%	▼1.40%
Communist Party of India 2 / 288 (0.7%)	17	2	▲1	230,570	1.31%	▼0.17%
Communist Party of India (Marxist) 2 / 288 (0.7%)	10	2	▼7	162,651	0.93%	▼0.76%
Republican Party of India (Khobragade) 1 / 288 (0.3%)	42	1	▼1	239,286	1.36%	▼0.05%
Republican Party of India	36	0	▼2	132,798	0.76%	▼0.30%
All India Forward Bloc	1	0	▼3	5,598	0.03%	▼0.79%
Independents 10 / 288 (3%)	612	10	▼18	1,409,177	8.03%	▼6.03%
Total	1537	288	Steady	17,548,655	53.30%	▼14.29%

=== Results by constituency ===
Winner, runner-up, voter turnout, and victory margin in every constituency
Assembly Constituency		Turnout	Winner				Runner Up				Margin
#k	Names	%	Candidate	Party	Votes	%	Candidate	Party	Votes	%	Margin
1	Sawantwadi	42.53%	Shivram Sawant Khem Sawant Bhonsale	INC(I)	21,156	49.35%	Jayanand Mathakar	JP	16,458	38.39%	4,698
2	Vengurla	37.29%	Sitaram Narayan Desai	INC(I)	16,528	46.73%	Bali Kinalekar	JP	15,916	45.00%	612
3	Malvan	37.89%	Keshavrao Vyankatesh Rane	INC(I)	14,591	40.87%	Baban Dsouza	JP	11,709	32.79%	2,882
4	Deogad	54.32%	Amrit Gangaram Rane	INC(I)	16,423	35.17%	Appa Gogate	BJP	14,165	30.34%	2,258
5	Rajapur	45.43%	Tavade Narayan Sakharam	JP	17,875	39.60%	Thakare Sahadeo Mukund	INC(I)	13,865	30.72%	4,010
6	Ratnagiri	46.06%	Abhyankar Kusum Ramchandra	BJP	16,996	34.26%	Jadyar Shivajirao Tulaji	INC(I)	16,483	33.23%	513
7	Sangameshwar	43.66%	Jagannathrao Jadhav	JP	27,252	61.61%	Laxmibai Bhuvad	INC(I)	10,423	23.56%	16,829
8	Guhagar	54.79%	Bendal Ramchandra Sadashiv	INC(I)	25,767	48.21%	Natu Dr. Shridhar Dattatray	BJP	25,541	47.79%	226
9	Chiplun	58.53%	Rajaram Shinde	JP	22,245	43.70%	Shinde Raghunath Gopalrao	INC(I)	15,340	30.14%	6,905
10	Khed	44.69%	Kadam Tukaram Baburao	INC(I)	24,334	57.56%	Bhosle Amrutrao Ganpatrao	JP	14,845	35.12%	9,489
11	Dapoli	53.67%	Sakpal Gangaram Daulat	JP	25,130	47.30%	Belose Ramchandra Vithal	INC(I)	23,745	44.70%	1,385
12	Mahad	59.77%	Chandrakant Khanderao Deshmukh	INC(I)	22,879	39.84%	Kishor Pawar	JP	14,035	24.44%	8,844
13	Shrivardhan	54.12%	Raut Ravindra Narayan	INC(I)	36,157	62.35%	Dandekar Madhukar Laxman	JP	20,829	35.92%	15,328
14	Mangaon	55.18%	Ashok Sabale	JP	26,662	48.98%	Ashok Laxman Lokhande	INC(I)	25,293	46.47%	1,369
15	Pen	57.91%	Mohan Mahadeo Patil	PWPI	36,996	61.82%	Gavand Vithalrav	INC(I)	21,651	36.18%	15,345
16	Alibag	57.23%	Patil Dattatrey Narayan	PWPI	41,191	67.73%	Bhagat Narayan Kanhoba	INC(I)	19,623	32.27%	21,568
17	Panvel	53.76%	Dinkar Balu Patil	PWPI	29,819	50.83%	Jaidas Sina Patil	INC(I)	27,802	47.39%	2,017
18	Khalapur	49.30%	Surve Tukaram Eknath	INC(I)	23,635	42.04%	Balkrishna Limbaji Patil	INC(U)	16,198	28.81%	7,437
19	Colaba	35.96%	O. P. Bahl	INC(I)	17,091	49.98%	Haresh Jagtiani	BJP	10,547	30.85%	6,544
20	Umarkhadi	27.89%	Khandwani Mohammad Amin	INC(I)	15,290	46.37%	Mistri Shantilal Poptalal	BJP	9,889	29.99%	5,401
21	Mumbadevi	32.51%	Nanubhai S. Patel (K. S. Patel)	BJP	15,643	44.88%	Lalit Jamnadas Kapadia	INC(I)	14,865	42.65%	778
22	Khetwadi	33.07%	Premkumar Shankardatt Sharma	BJP	18,475	47.00%	Qureshi M. Ismail Abdul Karim	INC(I)	18,335	46.65%	140
23	Opera House	37.23%	Jayawantiben Navinchandra Mehta	BJP	24,113	61.33%	Brid Shantaram Sakharam	INC(I)	14,861	37.80%	9,252
24	Malabar Hill	32.42%	Balvantray Ambelal Desai	INC(I)	19,464	43.27%	Parikha Narendra Natwarlal	BJP	18,574	41.29%	890
25	Chinchpokli	29.65%	Shaikh Shamim Ahmed	INC(I)	17,512	51.66%	Kaviskar Suhas Tulaji	Independent	9,363	27.62%	8,149
26	Nagpada	30.06%	Dr. Syed Ahmed (politician)	INC(I)	17,975	58.01%	Adam Adil	JP	6,670	21.53%	11,305
27	Mazgaon	45.57%	Atmaram Tukaram Bhosale Alias Bhai Bhosale	INC(I)	19,327	43.21%	Chandrakant Narayan Jagtap	BJP	10,539	23.56%	8,788
28	Parel	42.63%	Satish Pednekar	INC(I)	29,570	54.44%	Vasu Desai	JP	24,750	45.56%	4,820
29	Shivadi	40.21%	Bhaurao Patil	INC(I)	32,874	64.05%	Kamble Devidas Pundlik	Independent	17,349	33.80%	15,525
30	Worli	43.50%	Sharad Dighe	INC(I)	24,841	50.33%	Kurane Pralhad Krushna	CPI(M)	14,803	29.99%	10,038
31	Naigaon	45.00%	Ram Arjun Mahadik	INC(I)	28,784	53.20%	N. K. Sawant	JP	16,624	30.73%	12,160
32	Dadar	44.50%	Thakur Sharayu Govind	INC(I)	18,421	33.43%	Jayawant Moreshwar Patil	CPI	14,760	26.79%	3,661
33	Matunga	39.73%	V. Subramnian	INC(I)	22,186	44.08%	Rustom Tirandaz	BJP	15,394	30.59%	6,792
34	Mahim	41.97%	Frederick Michael Pinto	JP	25,254	52.25%	Kunte Prabhakar Kashinath	INC(I)	23,083	47.75%	2,171
35	Dharavi	33.35%	Premanand Awale	INC(I)	27,971	53.01%	Satyendra More	CPI(M)	11,501	21.80%	16,470
36	Vandre	38.07%	Ahmed B. Zakaria	INC(I)	22,440	48.02%	Sadanand Shankar Varde	JP	14,986	32.07%	7,454
37	Kherwadi	39.91%	Chheda Meghaji	INC(I)	21,765	43.72%	Ramdas Nayak	BJP	17,861	35.88%	3,904
38	Vile Parle	32.00%	Pranlal Vora	JP	24,215	56.66%	Dinesh Mehta	INC(I)	18,067	42.27%	6,148
39	Amboli	38.37%	Hafiz Yusuf	INC(I)	26,572	45.58%	Ramesh Sheth	BJP	15,266	26.19%	11,306
40	Santacruz	35.07%	C. D. Ommachen	INC(I)	24,928	50.28%	Pandey Suryaprasad Jagdev	BJP	12,659	25.53%	12,269
41	Andheri	28.80%	Chandarkant Tripathi	INC(I)	25,073	54.70%	Neelkanth Samant	BJP	13,283	28.98%	11,790
42	Goregaon	35.99%	C. M. Sharma	INC(I)	18,535	37.99%	Narendrakumar Konkar	BJP	17,113	35.07%	1,422
43	Malad	32.04%	Pandarale Ram Jankiram	INC(I)	22,747	43.59%	Sehgal Prannath	BJP	14,972	28.69%	7,775
44	Kandivali	33.59%	A. K. Shah	INC(I)	19,763	38.46%	M. M. Mehta	BJP	16,892	32.87%	2,871
45	Borivali	37.50%	Ram Naik	BJP	34,513	53.91%	Aaba Alias Ramakant Patil	INC(I)	21,819	34.08%	12,694
46	Trombay	37.98%	Lalita Rao	INC(I)	27,963	44.63%	Mujumdar Saurabh Ramakant	BJP	20,426	32.60%	7,537
47	Chembur	40.00%	Hashu Advani	BJP	24,810	45.17%	Vicki Kapoor	INC(I)	21,288	38.76%	3,522
48	Nehrunagar	38.90%	Babasaheb Anantrao Bhosale	INC(I)	21,276	44.98%	Eknath Ramchandra Koparde	JP	18,165	38.40%	3,111
49	Kurla	41.49%	Dutta Samant	Independent	29,410	42.53%	Celine D. Silva	INC(I)	22,383	32.37%	7,027
50	Ghatkopar	43.42%	Liladhar Shamji Vyas	INC(I)	20,331	32.92%	Ashwin Somnath Vyas	BJP	18,292	29.62%	2,039
51	Bhandup	34.48%	Shekerkar Waman Ramchandra	INC(I)	24,354	42.44%	Sanzgiri Prabhakar Pandurang	CPI(M)	17,955	31.29%	6,399
52	Mulund	39.32%	G. S. Trivedi	INC(I)	27,515	43.30%	Vamanrao Ganpatrao Parab	BJP	26,110	41.09%	1,405
53	Thane	39.03%	Kanti Kisan Koli	INC(I)	32,186	47.60%	Gajanan Motiram Koli	BJP	20,690	30.60%	11,496
54	Belapur	28.71%	Bhagat Balaji Kathod	INC(I)	28,688	58.65%	Bhagat Gowardhan Chango	BJP	9,424	19.27%	19,264
55	Ulhasnagar	48.08%	Harchandani Sitaldas Khubchand	BJP	35,198	54.06%	Baharani Gope Varyaldas	INC(I)	26,304	40.40%	8,894
56	Ambernath	43.98%	Nakul Pundalik Patil	INC(I)	31,365	47.08%	Jagannath Patil	BJP	28,158	42.27%	3,207
57	Kalyan	40.42%	Ramchandra Ganesh Kapse	BJP	39,066	56.03%	Pande Akhilesh Narayan	INC(I)	27,071	38.82%	11,995
58	Murbad	58.96%	Shantaram Gopal Gholap	INC(I)	36,422	61.48%	Krishnarao Dhulap	PWPI	22,011	37.15%	14,411
59	Wada	33.56%	Gowari Shankar Aba	INC(I)	16,874	40.71%	Vishnu Rama Savar	BJP	14,974	36.12%	1,900
60	Bhiwandi	48.48%	Momin Vaqar Ahmed Ghulam Mohmed	INC(I)	36,782	48.14%	Taware Parsharam Dhondu	JP	32,865	43.01%	3,917
61	Vasai	52.18%	Tarabai Narsinh Vartak	INC(I)	34,627	50.55%	Chaudhari Pandharinath Raghunath	JP	28,332	41.36%	6,295
62	Palghar	34.09%	Valvi Vishnu Gopal	INC(I)	17,956	48.78%	Shingade Arjun Kakadya	JP	16,729	45.45%	1,227
63	Dahanu	38.75%	Kadu Mahadeo Gopal	INC(I)	25,522	57.64%	Chavan Shankar Marya	CPI(M)	18,753	42.36%	6,769
64	Jawhar	45.89%	Kom Lahanu Shidva	CPI(M)	25,671	49.30%	Kirkira Tryambak Dhakal	INC(I)	19,089	36.66%	6,582
65	Shahapur	33.51%	Mahadu Nago Barora	INC(U)	14,156	43.84%	Mule Parshuram Mohaniraj	INC(I)	12,378	38.33%	1,778
66	Igatpuri	45.51%	Ghare Vitthalrao Ganpat	INC(I)	17,389	35.81%	Wagh Bhau Sakru	INC(U)	10,798	22.24%	6,591
67	Nashik	48.68%	Wavare Shantarambapu Kondaji	Independent	24,900	35.00%	Kathe Ganpatrao Pundalik	BJP	22,133	31.11%	2,767
68	Deolali	45.10%	Ahire Babulal Soma	INC(U)	28,876	52.22%	Mohekar Hiraman Chataru	INC(I)	18,778	33.96%	10,098
69	Sinnar	60.88%	Gadhak Suryabhan Sukdeo	INC(U)	46,639	72.45%	Waje Ashok Vithal	INC(I)	16,699	25.94%	29,940
70	Niphad	61.54%	Mogal Malojirao Sadashiv	INC(U)	38,612	55.53%	Boraste Madhavrao Kashiram	INC(I)	28,665	41.23%	9,947
71	Yevla	59.46%	Patil Janardan Deoram	INC(U)	25,851	39.83%	Kale Raybhan Gangadhar	Independent	18,047	27.81%	7,804
72	Nandgaon	63.44%	Dhatrak Jagannath Murlidhar	INC(I)	32,473	44.61%	Gaikwad Madhav Bayaji	CPI	20,678	28.41%	11,795
73	Malegaon	67.70%	Nihal Ahmed Maulavi Mohammed Usman	JP	42,604	50.20%	Shabbir Ahmed Haji Gulam Rasool	INC(I)	40,756	48.02%	1,848
74	Dabhadi	68.39%	Hiray Baliram Waman	INC(I)	38,906	54.58%	Hiray Vyankatrao Bhausaheb	INC(U)	30,785	43.19%	8,121
75	Chandwad	58.91%	Gaikwad Narayan Kashiram	INC(I)	22,027	37.12%	Thakare Narhar Karbhari	INC(U)	18,690	31.49%	3,337
76	Dindori	48.71%	Mahale Haribhau Shankar	JP	29,999	58.36%	Lilake Ramdas Ganapat	INC(I)	16,456	32.01%	13,543
77	Surgana	51.50%	Jiva Pandu Gavit	CPI(M)	18,134	35.57%	Bhoye Sitaram Sayaji	INC(I)	16,400	32.17%	1,734
78	Kalwan	41.07%	Arjun Tulshiram Pawar	INC(I)	30,490	73.06%	Gangurde Ramchandra Hanumanta	Independent	10,245	24.55%	20,245
79	Baglan	46.35%	Pawar Laxman Totaram	INC(I)	23,154	48.24%	Ahire Lahanu Bala	INC(U)	22,838	47.58%	316
80	Sakri	44.05%	Malusare Sukram Bhurya	INC(I)	21,807	43.20%	Koli Baburao Rangrao	BJP	18,768	37.18%	3,039
81	Navapur	49.10%	Manikrao Hodlya Gavit	INC(I)	45,357	83.13%	Kokani Brijlal Shrawan	BJP	6,753	12.38%	38,604
82	Nandurbar	46.49%	Ramesh Panya Valvi	INC(I)	37,198	68.86%	Gavit Nalinibai Tukaram	INC(U)	16,818	31.14%	20,380
83	Talode	50.91%	Abhimanyu Nurji Valvi	INC(I)	21,625	48.68%	Dilwarsing D. Padvi	BJP	9,112	20.51%	12,513
84	Akrani	49.46%	Pawara Rameshbhai Thikya	INC(I)	26,309	64.44%	Pawara Daga Vishram	JP	10,357	25.37%	15,952
85	Shahada	69.04%	Annasaheb P. K. Patil	JP	32,102	42.46%	Chaudhari Pralhad Alias Mohanbhai Bhaidas	INC(I)	25,998	34.38%	6,104
86	Shirpur	72.00%	Rajput Indrasing Chandrasing	INC(I)	38,691	51.24%	Patil Shivajirao Girdhar	INC(U)	24,261	32.13%	14,430
87	Sindkheda	60.42%	Patil Rangrao Madhavrao	INC(I)	21,320	35.10%	Shisode Madhukarrao Dipchand	JP	18,592	30.61%	2,728
88	Kusumba	68.32%	Rohidas Chudaman Patil	INC(I)	37,550	51.27%	Bhamare Ramrao Sitaram	INC(U)	35,684	48.73%	1,866
89	Dhule	52.92%	Ajmera Kamalabai Chhaganlal	INC(I)	25,541	42.80%	Khopade Kisanrao Manikrao	Independent	23,661	39.65%	1,880
90	Chalisgaon	46.32%	Dinakar Diwan Chavan	Independent	30,283	53.78%	Changre Vasudeorao Apuram	INC(I)	24,405	43.34%	5,878
91	Parola	50.16%	Patil Bhaskarrao Rajaram	Independent	25,326	40.21%	Vasantrao Jivanrao More	JP	17,623	27.98%	7,703
92	Amalner	55.98%	Gulabrao Wamanrao Patil	JP	36,179	54.52%	Chavan Sambhaji Govindrao	INC(I)	29,640	44.66%	6,539
93	Chopda	61.97%	Sharadchandrika Suresh Patil	INC(I)	37,435	60.68%	Devraj Sitaram Goba	INC(U)	23,280	37.73%	14,155
94	Erandol	44.17%	Wagh Parvatabai Chandrabhan	INC(I)	24,111	46.58%	Patil Vijay Dhanaji	JP	17,950	34.68%	6,161
95	Jalgaon	57.42%	Sureshkumar Bhikamchand Jain	INC(I)	43,827	59.38%	Chaudhari Tukaram Shripat	INC(U)	18,946	25.67%	24,881
96	Pachora	59.70%	Patil Krishnarao Maharu	INC(I)	37,601	53.71%	Onkar Narayan Wagh	JP	26,470	37.81%	11,131
97	Jamner	60.29%	Ishwarlal Shankarlal Jain	INC(U)	31,068	47.99%	Rathod Babusing Dagadusing	INC(I)	27,206	42.02%	3,862
98	Bhusawal	48.10%	Bagawan M. Yasin Rajmohamad	INC(I)	27,047	44.02%	Chaudhari Dagadu Kashiram	JP	25,961	42.25%	1,086
99	Yawal	61.05%	Jivaram Tukaram Mahajan	INC(U)	30,503	48.45%	Chaudhary Ramesh Vitthal	INC(I)	23,686	37.62%	6,817
100	Raver	56.76%	Ramkrishan Raghunath Patil	INC(I)	26,545	43.78%	Patil Ramkrishna Sitaram	INC(U)	18,932	31.23%	7,613
101	Edlabad	66.53%	Pratibha Patil	INC(I)	35,382	48.01%	Patil Pralhadrao Eknathrao	INC(U)	22,714	30.82%	12,668
102	Malkapur	64.59%	Sancheti Kisanlal Nathmal	BJP	23,581	34.81%	Mundhada Vinaykumar Premratan	INC(I)	19,674	29.04%	3,907
103	Buldhana	65.71%	Aher Sakharam Vithoba	INC(I)	33,143	43.49%	Patil Shivajirao Bhiku	INC(U)	28,299	37.13%	4,844
104	Chikhali	73.96%	Bharat Rajabhau Bondre	INC(U)	39,012	45.19%	Janardan Dattuappa Bondre	INC(I)	27,162	31.46%	11,850
105	Sindkhed Raja	69.23%	Shingane Bhaskarrao Sampatrao	PWPI	40,420	52.97%	Jaywantrao Kaluji Kharat	INC(I)	31,854	41.74%	8,566
106	Mehkar	63.46%	Sangle Kisanrao Tukaram	INC(I)	38,481	58.68%	Kale Ashru Baliram	INC(U)	22,388	34.14%	16,093
107	Khamgaon	55.29%	Pandurang Pundalik Fundkar	BJP	30,003	45.28%	Mohammed Mubinur Rahman Mohammed Ismail	INC(I)	26,714	40.32%	3,289
108	Jalamb	64.15%	Shradha Prabhakar Tapare	INC(I)	28,008	40.91%	Manikrao Deorao Patil	PWPI	19,197	28.04%	8,811
109	Akot	62.03%	Tapre Manohar Bhikaji	INC(I)	29,616	47.84%	Bhople Sampatrao Bhauji	BJP	21,538	34.79%	8,078
110	Borgaon Manju	63.71%	Divekar Arun Vishnu	INC(I)	31,461	43.67%	Bhuibhar Mahadeorao Gulabrao	Independent	24,558	34.09%	6,903
111	Akole	57.82%	Khan Mohammod Ajhar Hussein	INC(I)	28,027	42.34%	Tople Pramila W/O Asgar Husen	BJP	22,674	34.25%	5,353
112	Balapur	54.03%	Khode Pralhadrao Narayanrao	INC(I)	20,039	35.00%	Khandare Shankar Rao Sambhuji	RPI(K)	11,739	20.50%	8,300
113	Medshi	61.92%	Zanak Ramraoji Gopalrao	INC(I)	40,173	65.09%	Shinde Vitthalrao Kondaji	INC(U)	10,669	17.29%	29,504
114	Washim	40.27%	Dhendule Rameshwar Prabhati	INC(I)	24,652	63.30%	Ganpatrao Kanhuji Dhole	BJP	8,222	21.11%	16,430
115	Mangrulpir	58.62%	Rathod Gajadhar Ramsing	INC(U)	35,913	58.15%	Mohanawale Sherabhai Chhatubhai	INC(I)	19,423	31.45%	16,490
116	Murtizapur	55.16%	Kanot Suresh Walji	INC(I)	19,152	33.59%	Kambe Vasantao Janardan	Independent	10,763	18.88%	8,389
117	Karanja	54.73%	Rathi Ramkrushna Gangaramji	INC(I)	22,045	41.58%	Bang Manohar Motilalji	PWPI	17,193	32.43%	4,852
118	Daryapur	54.13%	Bobde Shanarrao Krishana Rao	INC(I)	27,207	49.94%	Hutke Ramrao Sheshrao	PWPI	18,581	34.10%	8,626
119	Melghat	46.24%	Narayan Nanu	INC(I)	31,420	67.24%	Patel Ramu Mhatang	Independent	10,131	21.68%	21,289
120	Achalpur	56.86%	Deshmukh Sudam Alias Waman Dattaraya	CPI	47,989	75.63%	Bhokare Waman Bajirao	INC(I)	13,359	21.05%	34,630
121	Morshi	51.37%	Gawande Kokilabai Jangannath	INC(I)	26,561	52.38%	Harshwardhan Pratapsinha Deshmukh	INC(U)	18,737	36.95%	7,824
122	Teosa	56.76%	Thakur Chandrakant Ramchandra	INC(I)	24,480	45.93%	Tasare Sharad Motiram	INC(U)	15,778	29.60%	8,702
123	Walgaon	53.11%	Ambadas Bapurao Bhau Sable	INC(I)	24,363	45.62%	Deshmukh Nilkanth Madhao	INC(U)	18,225	34.13%	6,138
124	Amravati	43.60%	Bhuyar Surendra Chatrapal	INC(I)	29,712	55.79%	Sawalakhe Sudhakar Ramchandra	INC(U)	14,155	26.58%	15,557
125	Badnera	49.62%	Meghe Ram Krushnarao	INC(I)	26,380	52.53%	Tikhile Ramdas Champatrao	INC(U)	8,632	17.19%	17,748
126	Chandur	56.39%	Sherekar Yashwant Gangaram	INC(I)	32,715	59.45%	Pratap Arunbhau Adsad	BJP	12,409	22.55%	20,306
127	Arvi	59.41%	Chudiwal Shiochand Gowardhandas	INC(I)	44,859	61.87%	Dr. Sharadrao Kale	INC(U)	22,472	31.00%	22,387
128	Pulgaon	54.21%	Manik Mahadeorao Sabane	INC(I)	41,626	68.01%	Prabha Rau	INC(U)	13,725	22.43%	27,901
129	Wardha	50.46%	Pramod Bhauraoji Shende	INC(I)	36,942	62.52%	Ramchandra Ghangare Marot	CPI(M)	17,251	29.20%	19,691
130	Hinganghat	52.26%	Kumbhare Dhanraj Laxmanrao	INC(I)	37,412	55.07%	Kolhe Deoraoji Zolbaji	INC(U)	19,718	29.02%	17,694
131	Umred	48.86%	Mulak Bhausaheb Govindrao	INC(I)	22,145	39.63%	Itankar Deorao Shrawan	INC(U)	12,715	22.75%	9,430
132	Kamthi	34.72%	Deotale Sureshbabu Baliramji	INC(I)	26,018	62.64%	Dr. Mohammad Shafi Qureshi	INC(U)	6,791	16.35%	19,227
133	Nagpur North	44.11%	Dongre Suryakant Jagobaji	RPI(K)	29,397	53.66%	Belekar Pushpchandra Marotrao	INC(I)	22,975	41.93%	6,422
134	Nagpur East	52.85%	Satish Jhaulal Chaturvedi	INC(I)	38,625	51.77%	Dhoble Balwantro Ganpatrao	BJP	28,629	38.37%	9,996
135	Nagpur South	50.89%	Banwarilal Purohit	INC(I)	31,965	53.66%	Dhepe Ramanand Dewaji	RPI(K)	20,064	33.68%	11,901
136	Nagpur Central	46.36%	Mohammed Yakub Kamar Khan Mohammed Sardar	INC(I)	25,838	51.30%	Samarth Manoharrao Nathusao	BJP	12,058	23.94%	13,780
137	Nagpur West	48.59%	Gev Manchersha Avari	INC(I)	33,770	49.99%	Dr. Ahuja Ramprakash Sohanlal	BJP	27,020	40.00%	6,750
138	Kalmeshwar	40.35%	Gaikwad Bhagwantrao Manikrao	INC(I)	32,692	75.77%	Doiphode Murkidhar Santosh	INC(U)	6,616	15.33%	26,076
139	Katol	60.49%	Shrikant Ramchandra Jichkar	INC(I)	26,564	45.45%	Korde Gangadhar Kothiramji	BJP	12,889	22.05%	13,675
140	Savner	53.29%	Naik Ramji Chiman	INC(I)	28,932	52.13%	Ingoke Vithalrao Kisan	INC(U)	22,181	39.96%	6,751
141	Ramtek	48.82%	Kimmatkar Madhukar Ghanshyamrao	INC(I)	28,140	49.57%	Pandurang Jairamji Hajare	JP	23,621	41.61%	4,519
142	Tumsar	66.89%	Karemore Subhashchandra Narayanraoji	INC(I)	34,991	50.24%	Patle Ishwardayal Mahipalji	JP	31,954	45.88%	3,037
143	Bhandara	62.21%	Dalal Madhavrao Tulsiram	Independent	25,395	40.06%	Ram Hedaoo	INC(I)	22,570	35.61%	2,825
144	Adyar	65.09%	Katekhaye Ramkrishana Zibalji	INC(U)	31,481	44.21%	Wanjari Anandrao Tukaram	INC(I)	18,065	25.37%	13,416
145	Tirora	55.77%	Dongare Sukhadeo Vithobaji	INC(I)	33,641	52.82%	Wasnik Laxminarayan Ganpat	INC(U)	17,498	27.47%	16,143
146	Gondiya	51.41%	Rajkumari Gopalnarayan Bajpayee	INC(I)	24,828	42.17%	Ramteke Bhojraj Sakharam	CPI	13,560	23.03%	11,268
42	Goregaon	35.99%	C. M. Sharma	INC(I)	18,535	37.99%	Narendrakumar Konkar	BJP	17,113	35.07%	1,422
148	Amgaon	64.55%	Mahadeo Shivankar	BJP	38,522	50.22%	Jain Kewalchand Kanhaiyalal	INC(I)	33,859	44.14%	4,663
149	Sakoli	65.88%	Katakwar Jayant Krushnamurari	INC(I)	30,953	40.68%	Nimbekar Govindrao Shivaji	BJP	26,976	35.45%	3,977
150	Lakhandur	60.18%	Bhaiyya Hiralal Nathmalji	INC(I)	27,049	37.43%	Diwathe Namdeo Harbaji	BJP	24,247	33.56%	2,802
151	Armori	44.77%	Madavi Baburao Narayan	INC(I)	31,352	65.83%	Pradhan Krushnarao Bapu Bhagirath Bapu	INC(U)	9,389	19.71%	21,963
152	Gadchiroli	43.72%	Marotrao Sainuji Kowase	INC(I)	25,192	56.23%	Meshram Bhagwanshaha Jiwanshaha	INC(U)	11,814	26.37%	13,378
151	Sironcha	-	Talandi Penta Rama	INC(I)	Elected Unopposed						
154	Rajura	53.91%	Mamulkar Prabhakar Bapurao	INC(I)	36,235	57.76%	Dhote Prabhakar Marotrao	BJP	22,001	35.07%	14,234
155	Chandrapur	50.58%	Nareshkumar Chunnalal Puglia	INC(I)	29,048	44.40%	Chandel Chandansinh Sadhusinh	BJP	16,606	25.38%	12,442
156	Saoli	65.33%	Tajane Mahadeo Laxmanrao	INC(I)	21,729	30.73%	Mashakhetri Baburao Patil	INC(U)	13,664	19.32%	8,065
157	Bramhapuri	75.50%	Khanokar Suresh Chintamanrao	Independent	57,242	61.86%	Dhammani Abdul Ajit Bhanjibhai	INC(I)	31,868	34.44%	25,374
158	Chimur	66.61%	Bajaj Yeshodhara Bhagirathji	INC(I)	44,264	54.12%	Poshattiwar Vasantrao Yadaorao	BJP	13,168	16.10%	31,096
159	Bhadrawati	58.02%	Dadasaheb Deotale	INC(I)	32,004	43.25%	Adkoo Patil Nannaware	Independent	29,129	39.37%	2,875
160	Wani	54.43%	Panghate Bapurao Harbaji	INC(I)	36,058	63.86%	Namdeorao Narayanrao Kale	CPI	19,082	33.79%	16,976
161	Ralegaon	40.96%	Dhurve Sudhakarrao Bakaram	INC(I)	38,521	83.06%	Poyam Krisha Urkuda	INC(U)	5,264	11.35%	33,257
162	Kelapur	51.46%	Shivajirao Moghe	INC(I)	41,048	81.80%	Kotnake Gangaram Sambhaji	BJP	4,864	9.69%	36,184
163	Yavatmal	46.46%	Trambak Dattatrya Deshmukh Alias Abasaheb	INC(I)	35,868	71.32%	Bhore Devidas Shamrao	Independent	9,106	18.11%	26,762
164	Darwha	60.71%	Mandhana Harish Rameshwar	INC(I)	28,881	45.17%	Rathod Shankar Gopala	INC(U)	21,929	34.30%	6,952
165	Digras	58.02%	Nanabhau Narayanrao Yembadwar	INC(I)	47,478	72.81%	Vilasrao Krishnarao Raut	INC(U)	16,789	25.75%	30,689
166	Pusad	72.79%	Sudhakarrao Rajusing Naik	INC(I)	48,368	61.29%	Todase Shamrao Rajhunath	INC(U)	30,553	38.71%	17,815
167	Umarkhed	66.99%	Deshmukh Trimbakrao Gopalrao	INC(I)	40,699	56.97%	Deosarkar Anantrao Apparao	INC(U)	29,882	41.83%	10,817
168	Kinwat	56.68%	Pachpute Kishanrao Champatrao	INC(I)	22,732	40.51%	Jadhav Subhash Limbaji	CPI	19,426	34.62%	3,306
169	Hadgaon	65.05%	Suryakanta Patil	INC(I)	34,713	48.42%	Shinde Bapurao Shivram Patil	INC(U)	34,196	47.70%	517
170	Nanded	54.82%	Kamalkishor Kadam	INC(U)	27,657	36.98%	M. Maqbool Salim Mohammed Khaja	AIML	21,030	28.12%	6,627
171	Mudkhed	49.13%	Sahebrao Baradkar Deshmukh	INC(I)	34,680	61.73%	Chandrakant Govindrao Maski	BJP	16,630	29.60%	18,050
172	Bhokar	51.49%	Deshmukh Balajirao Gopalrao	INC(I)	45,582	83.95%	Mundada Chandulal Bajranglal	JP	7,431	13.69%	38,151
173	Biloli	62.23%	Chavan Balwantrao Amratrao	INC(U)	35,693	41.12%	Patil Bhaskarrao Bapurao Khatgaonkar	INC(I)	35,212	40.57%	481
174	Mukhed	47.31%	Ravangaonkar Nagnathrao Satwaji	INC(U)	35,569	59.17%	Ghate Madhukarrao Rangoji	INC(I)	23,359	38.86%	12,210
175	Kandhar	51.61%	Ishwarrao Naryanrao Bhosikar	INC(I)	29,426	43.95%	Kurude Gurunathrao Manikrao	PWPI	29,371	43.87%	55
176	Gangakhed	43.72%	Gaikwad Dnyanoba Hari	PWPI	17,398	37.75%	Jangle Vilas Manikrao	INC(I)	14,375	31.19%	3,023
177	Singnapur	49.70%	Jamkar Raosaheb Bapusaheb	INC(I)	32,184	59.45%	Naik Babarao Sapanrao	PWPI	9,306	17.19%	22,878
178	Parbhani	47.35%	Abdul Rahman Khan Yousuf Khan	INC(I)	23,910	45.22%	Gawane Vijay Annasaheb	PWPI	15,172	28.69%	8,738
179	Basmath	52.34%	Ganeshrao Dudhgaonkar	INC(I)	21,548	35.09%	Deshmukh Panditrao Ramrao	JP	19,697	32.08%	1,851
180	Kalamnuri	49.79%	Adv. Rajani Shankarrao Satav	INC(I)	23,088	39.85%	Vithalrao Champatrao Naik	CPI(M)	13,475	23.26%	9,613
181	Hingoli	56.42%	Deshmukh Sahebrao Shankarrao	INC(I)	36,652	56.53%	Bangar Sampatrao Gyanbarao	INC(U)	13,300	20.51%	23,352
182	Jintur	54.90%	Manikrao Keshavrao Bhamble	INC(I)	23,862	39.87%	Sunderrao Kishanrao Chavan	INC(U)	15,747	26.31%	8,115
183	Pathri	58.15%	Zodgaonkar Dagduba Balaji	INC(U)	30,442	53.30%	Sakhram Gopalrao Nakhate	INC(I)	20,246	35.45%	10,196
184	Partur	49.97%	Borade Ramprasadji Vithalrao	INC(I)	32,860	61.50%	Wayal Gangadhar Kadaji	PWPI	15,787	29.54%	17,073
185	Ambad	54.06%	Bhalchandra Yeshwantrao	INC(I)	34,017	51.53%	Ankushrao Tope	INC(U)	23,307	35.31%	10,710
186	Jalna	48.00%	Dayma Ramkishan Ramchandra	INC(I)	35,204	61.70%	Jaiswal Radhakishan Bhaggulal	JP	18,693	32.76%	16,511
187	Badnapur	45.48%	Sharma Shakuntala Nandkishor	INC(I)	22,733	42.91%	Jarhad Baburao Ambadas	INC(U)	17,404	32.85%	5,329
188	Bhokardan	56.95%	Rangnath Shivram Patil	INC(U)	31,889	47.83%	Santoshrao Valuba Despute	INC(I)	27,408	41.11%	4,481
189	Sillod	64.56%	Manikrao Palodkar Sandu	INC(U)	33,293	52.03%	Kale Baburao Jangloo	INC(I)	24,145	37.73%	9,148
190	Kannad	51.73%	Raibhan Rambhaji Jadhav	INC(U)	23,144	36.96%	Baburao Manikrao	INC(I)	12,813	20.46%	10,331
191	Vaijapur	57.92%	Govindrao Adik	INC(U)	31,090	50.30%	Laxmanrao Bhagaji Bhise	INC(I)	28,260	45.72%	2,830
192	Gangapur	42.31%	Ashok Rajaram	INC(I)	23,126	40.97%	Laxmanrao Eknatharao Manal	INC(U)	16,041	28.42%	7,085
193	Aurangabad West	53.12%	Abdul Azim Abdul Hameed	INC(I)	27,302	33.88%	Amanullah Jan Mohmad	INC(U)	20,096	24.94%	7,206
194	Aurangabad East	49.24%	Autade Keshavrao Vishwanath	INC(I)	22,369	34.96%	Jadhav Vishwanath Suryabhan	INC(U)	18,219	28.48%	4,150
195	Paithan	55.38%	Kale Shivajirao Sahebrao	INC(I)	27,739	48.52%	Chandrakant Sonaki Ghodke	INC(U)	15,413	26.96%	12,326
196	Georai	63.32%	Pawar Madhavrao Alias Bappasaheb Shivajirao	INC(U)	34,798	48.17%	Shivajirao Ankushrao	INC(I)	34,641	47.96%	157
197	Majalgaon	62.77%	Govindrao Sitaram Dak	INC(U)	36,296	43.39%	Solanke Sunderrao Abasaheb	INC(I)	33,688	40.27%	2,608
198	Beed	48.59%	Jagtap Rajendra Sahebrao	INC(U)	24,626	40.18%	Kadam Shraopatrao Limbajirao	INC(I)	23,715	38.69%	911
199	Ashti	52.73%	Bhimrao Anandrao Dhonde	Independent	36,070	50.51%	Ajabe Chandrakant Bhausaheb	INC(I)	19,946	27.93%	16,124
200	Chausala	50.53%	Chandmal Rajmal Lodha	INC(U)	25,963	36.47%	Kshirsagar Jaidatta Sonajirao	INC(I)	16,512	23.19%	9,451
201	Kaij	42.04%	Gangadhar Nilkanth Swami	INC(U)	30,937	54.41%	Veena Bansilal Khare	INC(I)	7,137	12.55%	23,800
202	Renapur	66.46%	Gopinath Pandurang Munde	BJP	38,443	45.14%	Kokate Baburao Narsinghrao Adaskar	INC(I)	33,267	39.06%	5,176
203	Ahmedpur	62.86%	Deshmukh Kishanrao Nanasaheb	PWPI	34,183	50.18%	Dudile Vithalrao Tukaram	INC(I)	31,589	46.37%	2,594
204	Udgir	62.34%	Jadhav Balasaheb Kishanrao	INC(U)	33,243	44.95%	Patwari Manoharrao Digamberrao	JP	16,647	22.51%	16,596
205	Her	48.23%	Kamble Arvind Tulsiram	INC(I)	18,464	38.72%	Kamble Trimbak Pandurang	JP	14,899	31.24%	3,565
206	Latur	65.58%	Vilasrao Dagadojirao Deshmukh	INC(I)	38,160	42.15%	Nade Shivajirao Tukaram	INC(U)	33,856	37.39%	4,304
207	Kalamb	54.00%	Bhosale Vinayak Yadavrao	INC(I)	21,381	35.56%	Narhire Kashinath	INC(U)	17,654	29.36%	3,727
208	Paranda	61.42%	Chandansingh Baban Singh Saddiwal	INC(I)	25,950	36.88%	Sadashiv Yashwantrao Shinde	INC(U)	21,539	30.61%	4,411
209	Osmanabad	65.76%	Dr. Padamsinh Bajirao Patil	INC(U)	40,320	53.95%	Patil Nana Saheb Harishchandra	INC(I)	28,321	37.90%	11,999
210	Ausa	63.21%	Utge Shivshankarappa Vishwanathappa	INC(U)	28,258	46.99%	Patel Md. Mujibodin Ismail	INC(I)	28,144	46.80%	114
211	Nilanga	68.60%	Shivajirao Patil Nilangekar	INC(I)	43,550	54.25%	Madhukarrao Ganpatrao Somwanshi	PWPI	30,575	38.09%	12,975
212	Omerga	64.26%	Patil Rajaram Premnath	INC(U)	38,968	54.85%	Jagtap (Patil) Dattatraya Narsingrao	INC(I)	28,771	40.49%	10,197
213	Tuljapur	66.68%	Allure Sidramappa Nagappa	INC(I)	34,121	54.87%	Khaple Manikrao Bhimrao	PWPI	19,542	31.42%	14,579
214	Akkalkot	65.39%	Malgonda Pawarti Gurningappa	INC(I)	24,480	39.03%	Tanawade Babasaheb Sharannappa	BJP	19,677	31.37%	4,803
215	Solapur South	68.16%	Patil Gurunath Shivappa	JP	32,768	50.36%	Devakate Anandrao Narayan	INC(I)	31,646	48.63%	1,122
216	Solapur City South	61.94%	Kamale Dinanath Shireppa	INC(I)	28,635	46.19%	Shaikh Mohammed Yunnns Jainoddin	INC(U)	18,437	29.74%	10,198
217	Solapur City North	65.21%	Chakote Baburao Channappa	INC(U)	25,870	40.23%	Dikonda Vithalrao Sayanna	INC(I)	25,769	40.07%	101
218	North Sholapur	57.66%	Sushilkumar Sambhaji Shinde	INC(I)	32,511	54.78%	Ranshrungare Ramchandra Sakharam	INC(U)	25,436	42.86%	7,075
219	Mangalwedha	47.86%	Borade Vimaltai Dnyandeo	INC(I)	27,427	52.91%	Kambale Bajirao Dasharath	RPI	16,338	31.52%	11,089
220	Mohol	74.99%	Nimbalkar Chandrakant Dattaji	PWPI	37,143	50.22%	Shahjiroa Shankarrao Patil	INC(I)	36,812	49.78%	331
221	Barshi	64.49%	Narake Baburao Mahadev	INC(I)	32,455	48.61%	Barbole Arjun Ambrushi	INC(U)	30,195	45.23%	2,260
222	Madha	60.98%	Sathe Dhanaji Ganapatrao	INC(I)	29,698	43.99%	Shaha Kuntal Motichandra	Independent	18,707	27.71%	10,991
223	Pandharpur	65.15%	Dingare Pandurang Bhanudas	INC(I)	40,198	51.60%	Patil Audumbar Kondiba	INC(U)	36,999	47.50%	3,199
224	Sangola	67.67%	Ganpatrao Abasaheb Deshmukh	PWPI	48,262	57.45%	P. A. Bhambure	INC(I)	35,739	42.55%	12,523
225	Malshiras	73.57%	Vijaysinh Mohite–Patil	Independent	64,086	70.65%	Patil Shivajirao Bhavanrao	JP	25,655	28.28%	38,431
226	Karmala	64.37%	Namdeo Mahadeo Jagtap	INC(U)	20,006	35.03%	Zanpure Padmakar Vishwanath	Independent	14,157	24.79%	5,849
227	Karjat	47.03%	Nikalje Dagadu Sakharam	INC(U)	26,031	51.75%	Budhhivant Tukaram Kashinath	INC(I)	19,463	38.69%	6,568
228	Shrigonda	55.29%	Pachpute Babanrao Bhikaji	JP	27,992	42.45%	Nagwade Shivajirao Narayan	INC(I)	26,473	40.15%	1,519
229	Ahmednagar South	55.68%	Asir Shaikh Mohammad Ismail	INC(I)	30,122	45.64%	Paulbudhe Nath Jaywant	INC(U)	27,800	42.12%	2,322
230	Ahmednagar North	48.43%	Shelke Maruti Deoram	INC(I)	37,958	61.56%	Haral Kisanrao Rajaram	INC(U)	21,821	35.39%	16,137
231	Pathardi	56.82%	Babanrao Dhakne	JP	39,712	59.47%	Baburao Bhapse	Independent	15,041	22.52%	24,671
232	Shegaon	53.60%	Phatke Sambhajirao Shankarrao	INC(I)	27,025	47.48%	Langhe Vakilrao Baburao	CPI	24,318	42.72%	2,707
233	Shrirampur	65.12%	Murkute Bhanudas Kashinath	INC(I)	42,097	64.32%	Govindrao Wamanrao Adik	INC(U)	18,975	28.99%	23,122
234	Shirdi	61.79%	Mhaske Annasaheb Sarangdhar	INC(I)	37,193	62.11%	Jadhav Bhaskarrao Ramkrishana	INC(U)	17,552	29.31%	19,641
235	Kopargaon	76.14%	Shankarrao Genuji Kolhe	INC(I)	43,166	56.04%	Kale Shankerrao Deoram	INC(U)	33,335	43.27%	9,831
236	Rahuri	66.63%	Prasadrao Baburao Tanpure	INC(I)	33,647	49.60%	Pawar Kashinath Laxman	INC(U)	31,006	45.71%	2,641
237	Parner	59.06%	Babasaheb Prabhakar Appasaheb Thube	CPI	19,836	35.92%	Dnyandeo Daulatrao Pathare	INC(U)	12,144	21.99%	7,692
238	Sangamner	63.66%	B. J. Khatal-Patil	INC(I)	37,885	51.38%	Thorat Sambhaji Ramchandra	Independent	35,845	48.62%	2,040
239	Nagar–Akola	44.96%	Madhukar Pichad	INC(I)	25,182	43.27%	Mengal Sakru Budha	CPI	16,310	28.03%	8,872
240	Junnar	41.75%	Dilip Dhamdhere	INC(U)	28,484	62.41%	Balasaheb Purvant	INC(I)	16,588	36.35%	11,896
241	Ambegaon	57.17%	Kisanrao Bankhele	JP	21,056	40.16%	Kale B. D.	INC(U)	14,013	26.73%	7,043
242	Khed Alandi	34.87%	Kandge Ram Janardan	INC(U)	18,964	44.92%	Sorate Rajaram Gajanan	INC(I)	13,340	31.60%	5,624
243	Maval	55.94%	Gade Patil B. S.	INC(I)	23,032	37.36%	Krishnarao Bhegade	INC(U)	21,500	34.88%	1,532
244	Mulshi	52.50%	Navale Vidura Vithoba	INC(U)	38,158	64.44%	Ashok Namdeorao Mohol	INC(I)	18,974	32.04%	19,184
245	Haveli	43.60%	Motiram Pawar	INC(I)	24,218	32.04%	Ashok Mhaske	INC(U)	23,210	30.71%	1,008
246	Bopodi	50.33%	Kadam Shashikant Rajaram	INC(I)	23,751	48.51%	Bhosale Shivajirao Jagannathrao	INC(U)	11,980	24.47%	11,771
247	Shivajinagar	49.96%	Laxman Sonopant Joshi	BJP	26,273	36.53%	Shridhar Madgulkar	INC(I)	25,500	35.46%	773
248	Parvati	48.47%	Vasant Chavan	INC(I)	36,233	52.00%	Gangurde Vishwas Krishnarao	BJP	22,880	32.84%	13,353
249	Kasba Peth	55.66%	Arvind Lele	BJP	28,851	43.07%	Dhere Prakash Keshavrao	INC(I)	25,249	37.70%	3,602
250	Bhavani Peth	48.63%	Amminuddin A. A. Penwale	INC(I)	27,520	46.71%	Bhalchandra Vaidya	JP	19,886	33.75%	7,634
251	Pune Cantonment	55.68%	Vitthal Tupe	JP	27,860	40.89%	Shivajirao Krishnaji Ghule	INC(I)	25,546	37.49%	2,314
252	Shirur	58.57%	Palande Suryakant Gulabrao	INC(U)	38,648	68.52%	Dhariwal Rasiklal Manikchand	INC(I)	14,897	26.41%	23,751
253	Daund	44.21%	Jagadale Krishnarao Bajirao	INC(U)	29,944	51.97%	Kadam Fakkadrao Yeduji	INC(I)	15,981	27.74%	13,963
254	Indapur	65.63%	Gholap Rajendra Kumar Baburao	INC(I)	41,619	53.74%	More Jagannathrao Marutrao	INC(U)	35,826	46.26%	5,793
255	Baramati	71.01%	Sharad Pawar	INC(U)	54,919	66.80%	Chopade Marutrao Dhondiba	INC(I)	26,550	32.30%	28,369
256	Purandar	52.66%	Kunjir Sambhajirao Ramchandra	INC(U)	23,901	37.11%	Dada Jadhav	JP	23,175	35.98%	726
257	Bhor	66.63%	Anantrao Thopate	INC(I)	33,856	53.26%	Sampatrao Ramchandra Jedhe	INC(U)	28,543	44.90%	5,313
258	Phaltan	66.67%	Kadam Suryajirao Shankarrao Alias Chimanrao	INC(U)	46,210	64.48%	Naik Nimbalkar Ranjatsinh Hindurao	INC(I)	22,908	31.96%	23,302
259	Man	56.37%	Sonavane Vishnu Tatoba	INC(U)	32,307	49.60%	Mane Gundopant Balaji	INC(I)	28,101	43.14%	4,206
260	Khatav	67.52%	Patil Keshavrao Shankarrao	INC(I)	40,101	56.58%	Mane Hanamantrao Jijaba	INC(U)	29,301	41.34%	10,800
261	Koregaon	59.49%	Jagtap Shankarrao Chimaji	INC(U)	34,829	55.02%	Barge Dattajirao Bhausaheb	INC(I)	23,227	36.69%	11,602
262	Wai	64.88%	Prataprao Baburao Bhosale	INC(U)	42,438	66.63%	Madanrao Ganpatrao Pisal	INC(I)	18,914	29.70%	23,524
263	Jaoli	63.79%	Kadam Dhondiram Bhikoba	INC(U)	37,095	49.96%	Sabale Balkrishna Anant	INC(I)	35,834	48.26%	1,261
264	Satara	63.36%	Abhaysinh Shahumaharaj Bhosale	INC(I)	36,048	49.73%	Uthale Babanrao Alias Laxman Sadashiv	INC(U)	28,193	38.89%	7,855
265	Patan	66.96%	Daulatrao Shripatrao Desai	INC(I)	40,483	54.60%	Vikramsinh Ranjitsinh Patankar	INC(U)	33,660	45.40%	6,823
266	Karad North	65.88%	Pandurang Dadasaheb Patil	INC(U)	41,650	54.90%	Lad Jaysing Baburao	INC(I)	17,707	23.34%	23,943
267	Karad South	67.34%	Vilasrao Balkrishna Patil	INC(U)	43,348	55.34%	Patil Bhimmrao Dhondiram	Independent	22,586	28.84%	20,762
268	Shirala	70.94%	Shivajirao Bapusaheb Deshmukh	INC(I)	54,379	65.49%	Fattesing Anandrao Naik	INC(U)	28,032	33.76%	26,347
269	Walva	70.54%	Patil Vishwasrao Atmaram	JP	40,779	47.92%	Patil Gulabrao Raghunath	INC(I)	32,856	38.61%	7,923
270	Bhilwadi Wangi	68.67%	Sampatrao Annasaheb Chavan	INC(I)	33,476	42.64%	Patangrao Kadam	Independent	33,390	42.53%	86
271	Sangli	61.64%	Shalini Patil	INC(I)	44,341	66.13%	Pailwan Mohite Namdrao Ganapati	INC(U)	14,799	22.07%	29,542
272	Miraj	57.83%	Shinde Mohanrao Alias Ramsing Ganpatrao	INC(I)	37,343	62.35%	Nagargoje Raghunath Ganpatrao	Independent	18,367	30.67%	18,976
273	Tasgaon	66.87%	Dinkarrao (Aba) Krishnaji Patil	Independent	25,206	36.12%	Ganapatrao Nayaku Koli	INC(I)	23,678	33.93%	1,528
274	Khanapur Atpadi	64.77%	Hanumantrao Yashwantrao Patil	INC(U)	33,416	43.49%	Salunkhe Shahajirao Ganpatrao	INC(I)	32,383	42.15%	1,033
275	Kavathe Mahankal	49.15%	Vitthal Shripati Patil	INC(I)	40,030	70.63%	Pandit Narayan Jadhav	Independent	8,550	15.08%	31,480
276	Jat	40.96%	Sohani Jayant Ishawar	INC(I)	29,036	64.58%	Waghamode Shankar Yamanappa	JP	12,600	28.02%	16,436
277	Shirol	76.80%	Yadav Dinkarrao Bhausaheb	PWPI	46,288	50.97%	Dr. Ratnappa Bharamappa Kumbhar	INC(I)	43,610	48.02%	2,678
278	Ichalkaranji	70.61%	Kallappa Baburao Awade	INC(U)	44,104	47.95%	Khanjire Babasaheb Bhausaheb	INC(I)	32,905	35.77%	11,199
279	Vadgaon	39.47%	Avale Jayawant Gangaram	INC(I)	29,771	63.55%	Mane Nanasaheb Shantaram	Independent	5,596	11.94%	24,175
280	Shahuwadi	53.75%	Babasaheb Yeshwantrao Patil Sarudkar	INC(I)	44,864	79.49%	Rau Dhondi Patil	PWPI	11,573	20.51%	33,291
281	Panhala	63.90%	Patil Yeshwant Eknath	Independent	34,800	57.48%	Patil Dnyandeo Yeshwant	INC(I)	12,913	21.33%	21,887
282	Sangrul	78.38%	Bondre Shripatrao Shankarrao	INC(U)	29,879	35.90%	Khade Maruti Dhondi	INC(I)	26,216	31.50%	3,663
283	Radhanagari	74.85%	Kadav Haribhau Ramchandra	INC(I)	36,820	42.78%	Patil Hindurao Balwant	INC(U)	25,165	29.24%	11,655
284	Kolhapur	52.15%	Yadav Lalsaheb Belasaheb	INC(I)	21,718	36.92%	Salokhe Hindurao Krishnarao	PWPI	14,740	25.06%	6,978
285	Karvir	59.17%	Digvijay Bhauso Khanvilkar	INC(I)	33,346	46.80%	Patil S. R. Alias Shamrao Ramaji	INC(U)	30,347	42.59%	2,999
286	Kagal	82.01%	Ghatage Vikramsinh Jayasingrao	INC(I)	44,348	54.02%	Mandlik Sadashiv Dadoba	INC(U)	37,741	45.98%	6,607
287	Gadhinglaj	71.85%	Ghali Shivaling Shivayogi	INC(I)	31,395	42.51%	Shinde Shripatrao Dinkarrao	JP	25,114	34.00%	6,281
288	Chandgad	73.73%	V. K. Chavan Patil	INC(I)	38,695	49.86%	Narsingrao Gurunath Patil	INC(U)	32,205	41.50%	6,490
