= Sangrul Assembly constituency =

Constituency of the Maharashtra legislative assembly in India

Sangrul
- Former constituency for the Maharashtra Legislative Assembly

Constituency details
- Country: India
- Region: Western India
- State: Maharashtra
- Established: 1978
- Abolished: 2008
- Total electors: 194,456

Sangrul Assembly constituency was an assembly constituency in the India state of Maharashtra.

== Members of the Legislative Assembly ==
Election	Member	Party
1978	Bondre Shripatrao Shankarrao	Indian National Congress
1980	Bondre Shripatrao Shankarrao	Indian National Congress
1985	Kalikate Govindrao Tukaram	Peasants and Workers Party of India
1990	Bondre Shripatrao Shankarrao	Indian National Congress
1995	Sampatbapu Shamrao Pawarpatil	Peasants and Workers Party of India
1999	Sampatbapu Shamrao Pawarpatil	Peasants and Workers Party of India
2004	P. N. Patil (Sadolikar)	Indian National Congress

== Election results ==
=== Assembly Election 2004 ===
2004 Maharashtra Legislative Assembly election : Sangrul
Party	Candidate	Votes	%	±%
INC	P. N. Patil (Sadolikar)	99,439	60.21%	▲16.99
PWPI	Sampatbapu Shamrao Pawarpatil	54,442	32.97%	▼16.46
SS	Aarekar-Patil Bajirao Sakharam	6,952	4.21%	▲1.74
BSP	Satpute Prakash Dagadu	2,391	1.45%	New
Independent	Sameer Madhavrao Mohite	1,893	1.15%	New
Margin of victory		44,997	27.25%	▲21.04
Turnout		165,143	84.91%	▲3.92
Registered electors		194,456		▲13.54
INC gain from PWPI		Swing	▲10.78	

=== Assembly Election 1999 ===
1999 Maharashtra Legislative Assembly election : Sangrul
Party	Candidate	Votes	%	±%
PWPI	Sampatbapu Shamrao Pawarpatil	68,576	49.43%	▲3.33
INC	P. N. Patil (Sadolikar)	59,971	43.23%	▼0.47
SS	Anandrao Dinkar Dindorle	3,432	2.47%	▼1.05
Margin of victory		8,605	6.20%	▲3.80
Turnout		138,736	77.45%	▼1.45
Registered electors		171,262		▲2.96
PWPI hold		Swing	▲3.33	

=== Assembly Election 1995 ===
1995 Maharashtra Legislative Assembly election : Sangrul
Party	Candidate	Votes	%	±%
PWPI	Sampatbapu Shamrao Pawarpatil	63,236	46.10%	▲31.31
INC	P. N. Patil (Sadolikar)	59,934	43.70%	▼8.99
SS	Dindorle Anand Rao Dinkar	4,836	3.53%	▼2.98
Independent	Kalikate Dipakrao Govindrao	3,204	2.34%	New
Margin of victory		3,302	2.41%	▼28.71
Turnout		137,162	80.67%	▲2.69
Registered electors		166,333		▲17.47
PWPI gain from INC		Swing	▼6.58	

=== Assembly Election 1990 ===
1990 Maharashtra Legislative Assembly election : Sangrul
Party	Candidate	Votes	%	±%
INC	Bondre Shripatrao Shankarrao	59,507	52.68%	▲3.85
Independent	Patil Anandrao Dnyandey	24,360	21.57%	New
PWPI	Kalikate Govindrao Tukaram	16,714	14.80%	▼34.80
SS	Dindorle Anand Rao Dinkar	7,343	6.50%	New
Independent	Patil Sakharam Shripati	1,517	1.34%	New
Independent	Patil Ashok Balgonda	1,365	1.21%	New
Margin of victory		35,147	31.12%	▲30.36
Turnout		112,951	78.80%	▼2.50
Registered electors		141,597		▲22.22
INC gain from PWPI		Swing	▲3.09	

=== Assembly Election 1985 ===
1985 Maharashtra Legislative Assembly election : Sangrul
Party	Candidate	Votes	%	±%
PWPI	Kalikate Govindrao Tukaram	47,270	49.59%	▲18.71
INC	Bondre Shripatrao Shankarrao	46,546	48.83%	New
Margin of victory		724	0.76%	▼3.64
Turnout		95,313	81.12%	▲2.53
Registered electors		115,854		▲11.01
PWPI gain from INC(U)		Swing	▲13.69	

=== Assembly Election 1980 ===
1980 Maharashtra Legislative Assembly election : Sangrul
Party	Candidate	Votes	%	±%
INC(U)	Bondre Shripatrao Shankarrao	29,879	35.90%	New
INC(I)	Khade Maruti Dhondi	26,216	31.50%	▲27.62
PWPI	Kalikate Govindrao Tukaram	25,701	30.88%	▼9.10
Margin of victory		3,663	4.40%	▼7.52
Turnout		83,217	78.38%	▼4.52
Registered electors		104,359		▲6.56
INC(U) gain from INC		Swing		

=== Assembly Election 1978 ===
1978 Maharashtra Legislative Assembly election : Sangrul
Party	Candidate	Votes	%	±%
INC	Bondre Shripatrao Shankarrao	42,835	51.91%	New
PWPI	Kalikate Govindrao Tukaram	32,996	39.98%	New
INC(I)	Lambore Dnyandeo Gopal	3,207	3.89%	New
Independent	Chougale Baburao Mahadeo	1,546	1.87%	New
Margin of victory		9,839	11.92%	
Turnout		82,522	82.68%	
Registered electors		97,939		
INC win (new seat)				
