= Kalamb Assembly constituency =

Constituency of the Maharashtra legislative assembly in India

Kalamb
- Former constituency for the Maharashtra Legislative Assembly

Constituency details
- Country: India
- Region: Western India
- State: Maharashtra
- Established: 1952
- Abolished: 2008
- Total electors: 181,208

Kalamb Assembly constituency was an assembly constituency in the India state of Maharashtra.

== Members of the Legislative Assembly ==
Election	Member	Party
1952	Narayan Zuglaji Nandurkar	Indian National Congress
1978	Ghodke Kundlik Eknath	Peasants and Workers Party of India
1980	Bhosale Vinayak Yadavrao	Indian National Congress
1985	Ghodke Kundlik Eknath	Peasants and Workers Party of India
1990	Ghodke Kundlik Eknath	Peasants and Workers Party of India
1995	Narhire Kalpana Ramesh	Shiv Sena
1999	Narhire Kalpana Ramesh	Shiv Sena
2004	Dayanand Bhimrao Gaikwad	Shiv Sena

== Election results ==
=== Assembly Election 2004 ===
2004 Maharashtra Legislative Assembly election : Kalamb
Party	Candidate	Votes	%	±%
SS	Dayanand Bhimrao Gaikwad	38,255	31.72%	▼4.89
INC	Kamble Shivaji Vitthal	36,952	30.64%	▲15.74
Independent	Kathvate Jayantkumar Raghvendra	18,353	15.22%	New
PWPI	Garad Dilip Kamalakar	11,257	9.33%	▼9.18
LJP	Gaikwad Machindra Rajaram	2,734	2.27%	New
BBM	Prop. Sanjay Ramchandra Kamble	2,432	2.02%	New
Independent	Sarwade Jitendra Saheba	1,571	1.30%	New
Margin of victory		1,303	1.08%	▼17.01
Turnout		120,616	66.50%	▼0.47
Registered electors		181,208		▲17.57
SS hold		Swing	▼4.89	

=== Assembly Election 1999 ===
1999 Maharashtra Legislative Assembly election : Kalamb
Party	Candidate	Votes	%	±%
SS	Kalpana Ramesh Narhire	37,826	36.61%	▼13.41
PWPI	Ghodke Kundlik Eknath	19,132	18.52%	▲6.79
INC	Gaikwad Machindra Rajaram	15,396	14.90%	▼12.92
Independent	Sarwade Yashwant Pralhadrao	12,664	12.26%	New
Independent	Kathvate Jayantkumar Raghvendra	4,770	4.62%	New
Independent	Thorat Sadhu Kondiba	3,191	3.09%	New
Independent	Sadaphule Pandurang Kisanrao	1,277	1.24%	New
Margin of victory		18,694	18.09%	▼4.10
Turnout		103,324	62.21%	▼5.50
Registered electors		154,131		▼3.87
SS hold		Swing	▼13.41	

=== Assembly Election 1995 ===
1995 Maharashtra Legislative Assembly election : Kalamb
Party	Candidate	Votes	%	±%
SS	Narhire Kalpana Ramesh	58,171	50.02%	▲29.86
INC	Trimbake Ramling Gundiba	32,360	27.82%	New
PWPI	Ghodke Kundlik Eknath	13,637	11.73%	▼30.43
Independent	Gaikwad Machindra Rajaram	3,442	2.96%	New
Independent	Magre Krishnat Bajrang	1,665	1.43%	New
Independent	Bhosale Vinayak Yadavrao	1,462	1.26%	New
Independent	Housalmal Dyandeo Govind	1,128	0.97%	New
Margin of victory		25,811	22.19%	▲9.46
Turnout		116,306	70.54%	▲16.50
Registered electors		160,341		▲6.43
SS gain from PWPI		Swing	▲7.86	

=== Assembly Election 1990 ===
1990 Maharashtra Legislative Assembly election : Kalamb
Party	Candidate	Votes	%	±%
PWPI	Ghodke Kundlik Eknath	35,588	42.15%	▼9.94
Independent	Yeshwant Pralahadrao Sarwade	24,839	29.42%	New
SS	Gople Babasaheb Sitaram	17,015	20.15%	New
Independent	Shinde Tulshiram Hiraji	1,629	1.93%	New
BRP	Prakash Baburao Khandagale	998	1.18%	New
Independent	Vikram Rangnath Kamble	857	1.02%	New
Independent	Bansilal Appa Zade	708	0.84%	New
Margin of victory		10,749	12.73%	▼15.11
Turnout		84,427	54.95%	▼3.54
Registered electors		150,651		▲25.01
PWPI hold		Swing	▼9.94	

=== Assembly Election 1985 ===
1985 Maharashtra Legislative Assembly election : Kalamb
Party	Candidate	Votes	%	±%
PWPI	Ghodke Kundlik Eknath	37,406	52.09%	▲23.97
INC	Bhosale Vinayak Yadavrao	17,413	24.25%	New
Independent	Narhire Kashinath	5,727	7.98%	New
Independent	Bhimrao Ramji Gaikwad	4,282	5.96%	New
Independent	Ingole Vijayatai Madhukarrao	2,913	4.06%	New
Independent	Madhukar Mukundrao Khalse	1,291	1.80%	New
Independent	Machindra Rajaram Gaikwad	1,009	1.41%	New
Margin of victory		19,993	27.84%	▲21.64
Turnout		71,810	58.12%	▲4.14
Registered electors		120,515		▲11.117
PWPI gain from INC(I)		Swing	▲16.53	

=== Assembly Election 1980 ===
1980 Maharashtra Legislative Assembly election : Kalamb
Party	Candidate	Votes	%	±%
INC(I)	Bhosale Vinayak Yadavrao	21,381	35.56%	▲27.96
INC(U)	Narhire Kashinath	17,654	29.36%	New
PWPI	Ghodke Kundlik Eknath	16,910	28.12%	▼6.72
RPI	S. K. Kadam	1,641	2.73%	▼25.92
[[Janata Party (Secular) Charan Singh|Janata Party (Secular) Charan Singh]]	Pidge Ganpatrao Kushaba	829	1.38%	New
Margin of victory		3,727	6.20%	▲0.01
Turnout		60,134	54.00%	▼1.25
Registered electors		108,458		▲7.21
INC(I) gain from PWPI		Swing	▲0.72	

=== Assembly Election 1978 ===
1978 Maharashtra Legislative Assembly election : Kalamb
Party	Candidate	Votes	%	±%
PWPI	Ghodke Kundlik Eknath	19,982	35.94%	New
RPI	S. K. Kadam	16,431	29.55%	New
RPI(K)	Dhavare Abhimanyu Sukhdeorao	7,480	13.45%	New
INC(I)	R. K. Mane	4,355	7.83%	New
Independent	Gangadhar Sukhdeo Gade	4,149	7.46%	New
Independent	B. S. Sonwane	1,797	3.23%	New
Independent	Chavan Marruti Sitaram	1,036	1.86%	New
Margin of victory		3,551	6.39%	▼36.59
Turnout		57,359	56.70%	▼3.85
Total valid votes		55,600		
Registered electors		1,01,165		▲94.91
PWPI gain from INC		Swing	▼23.06	

=== Assembly Election 1952 ===
1952 Madhya Pradesh Legislative Assembly election : Kalamb
Party	Candidate	Votes	%	±%
INC	Narayan Zuglaji Nandurkar	18,008	59.00%	New
SCF	Ragho Fakira	4,889	16.02%	New
Independent	Laxman Vithalrao Barde	4,019	13.17%	New
SKP	Balwant Sampatrao Khadwe	2,822	9.25%	New
Independent	Bapurao Suryabhan Dhote	785	2.57%	New
Margin of victory		13,119	42.98%	
Turnout		30,523	58.81%	
Total valid votes		30,523		
Registered electors		51,903		
INC win (new seat)				
