= 1978 Maharashtra Legislative Assembly election =

State Assembly election in India

- 25 February 1978

All 288 seats in the Maharashtra Legislative Assembly 145 seats needed for a majority
- Turnout: 67.59% (▲6.94%)
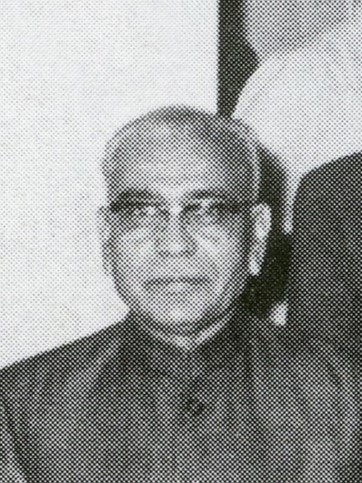
	Majority party	Minority party
	JP
Party	JP	INC
Last election	New	222
Seats won	99	69
Chief Minister before election
Vasantdada Patil
INC
Elected Chief Minister
Vasantdada Patil
INC

The 1978 Maharashtra State Assembly election was held in March 1978 for the fifth term of the Maharashtra Vidhan Sabha. A total of 288 seats were contested. Congress factions (u) and (i) formed the government and Vasantdada Patil was sworn in again as the Chief Minister.

== List of participating political parties ==
Party	Abbreviation
National parties
Janata Party	JP
Indian National Congress	INC
Indian National Congress (Indira)	INC(I)
Communist Party of India (Marxist)	CPM
Communist Party of India	CPI
State parties
Indian Union Muslim League	IUML
Peasants and Workers Party	PWP
All India Forward Bloc	AIFB
Registered (unrecognised) parties
Akhil Bharatiya Hindu Mahasabha	HMS
Shiv Sena	SHS
Republican Party of India	RPI
Republican Party of India (Khobragade)	RPI(K)

== Results ==
=== Party results ===
Summary of results of the Maharashtra State Assembly election, 1978
Political party	No. of candidates	No. of elected	Seat change	Number of votes	% of votes	Change in vote %
Janata Party 99 / 288 (34%)	215	99	▲99	5,701,399	27.99%	▲27.99% (New Party)
Indian National Congress 69 / 288 (24%)	259	69	▼153	5,159,828	25.33%	▼31.03%
Indian National Congress (Indira) 62 / 288 (22%)	203	62	▲62	3,735,308	18.34%	▲18.34% (New Party)
Peasants and Workers Party of India 13 / 288 (5%)	88	13	▲6	1,129,172	5.54%	▼0.12%
Communist Party of India (Marxist) 9 / 288 (3%)	12	9	▲8	345,008	1.69%	▲0.92%
All India Forward Bloc 3 / 288 (1%)	6	3	▲1	166,497	0.82%	▼1.58%
Republican Party of India (Khobragade) 2 / 288 (0.7%)	23	2	▲2	287,533	1.41%	▲1.41% (New Party)
Republican Party of India 2 / 288 (0.7%)	25	2	Steady	215,487	1.06%	▼2.71%
Communist Party of India 1 / 288 (0.3%)	48	1	▼1	301,056	1.48%	▼1.25%
Shiv Sena	35	0	▼1	369,749	1.82%	▼0.02%
Indian Union Muslim League	5	0	Steady	88,654	0.44%	▲0.26%
Independents 28 / 288 (10%)	894	28	▲5	2,864,023	14.06%	▲1.38%
Total	1819	288	▲18	20,367,221	67.59%	▲6.94%

=== Results by constituency ===
Winner, runner-up, voter turnout, and victory margin in every constituency
Assembly Constituency		Turnout	Winner				Runner Up				Margin
#k	Names	%	Candidate	Party	Votes	%	Candidate	Party	Votes	%	Margin
1	Sawantwadi	68.84%	Mathkar Jayanand Shivram	JP	41,331	61.82%	Bhalchandra Anant Sawant	INC	20,992	31.40%	20,339
2	Vengurla	67.77%	Kinalkar Pundlik Atmaram	JP	43,525	69.48%	Sitaram Narayan Desai	INC	14,743	23.53%	28,782
3	Malvan	64.90%	Dalvi Yashwant Babaji	JP	35,221	59.00%	Keshavrao Vyankatesh Rane	INC	11,429	19.15%	23,792
4	Deogad	66.49%	Vasant Sadashiv Satam	JP	39,499	68.07%	Rajabhau Mirashi	INC	14,774	25.46%	24,725
5	Rajapur	68.13%	Hatankar Laxman Rangnath	JP	46,099	70.67%	Thakare Sahadeo Mukund	INC	14,693	22.53%	31,406
6	Ratnagiri	63.32%	Abhyankar Kusum Ramchandra	JP	29,901	46.17%	Paje Shantaram Laxman	INC	19,876	30.69%	10,025
7	Sangameshwar	62.95%	Jagannath Jadhav	JP	40,263	67.57%	Bhuwad Laxmibai Babaji	INC	11,770	19.75%	28,493
8	Guhagar	65.74%	Shridhar Dattatray Natu	JP	40,320	66.19%	Nikam Govind Shivajirao	INC	20,592	33.81%	19,728
9	Chiplun	72.05%	Shinde Rajaram Keshav	JP	28,293	46.94%	Shinde Vasantrao Balwantrao	INC	19,128	31.73%	9,165
10	Khed	63.87%	Bhosle Amrutrao Ganpatrao	JP	30,158	52.04%	Husen Dalwai	INC	27,506	47.46%	2,652
11	Dapoli	69.85%	Sakpal Gangaram Daulat	JP	41,273	60.42%	Belose Ramchandra Vithal	INC	24,978	36.57%	16,295
12	Mahad	69.81%	Digambar Vinayak	JP	37,413	60.03%	Shankar Babaji Alias Dadasaheb Sawant	INC	22,046	35.37%	15,367
13	Shrivardhan	63.01%	Ukaye A. Shakur A. Karim	JP	31,001	48.65%	Raut Ravindra Narayan	INC(I)	26,607	41.76%	4,394
14	Mangaon	59.83%	Ram Vithhal Mahalunge	INC	18,313	33.56%	Gaikwad Krishna Kalu	Independent	13,185	24.16%	5,128
15	Pen	68.17%	Ambaji Tukaram Patil	INC	28,478	43.61%	Mohan Mahadeo Patil	PWPI	25,541	39.11%	2,937
16	Alibag	72.23%	Datta Narayan Patil	PWPI	34,958	48.22%	Khanvilkar Datajirao Krishnanarao	INC	21,723	29.97%	13,235
17	Panvel	65.35%	Dattatraya Narayan Patil	PWPI	21,229	32.92%	Gajanan Narayan Patil	INC	15,637	24.25%	5,592
18	Khalapur	62.19%	Balkrishna Limbaji Patil	INC	21,587	33.17%	Raut Sumant Rajaram	PWPI	15,656	24.06%	5,931
19	Colaba	54.71%	Ranjit Bhanu	JP	24,479	45.61%	Vyas Manjula Mukundray	INC(I)	10,848	20.21%	13,631
20	Umarkhadi	52.53%	Chorwadwalla Abdul Kader Ibrahim	JP	26,191	41.46%	Zaidi Syed Mahammad	AIML	22,759	36.03%	3,432
21	Mumbadevi	55.36%	Parikh Mohanlal Pranlal	JP	38,872	63.84%	Popat Mohan Bhavanbhai	INC	9,580	15.73%	29,292
22	Khetwadi	53.50%	Khan Khaleeq Ahmed	JP	36,246	55.06%	Deshmukh Sahebrao Ramchandra	INC(I)	10,594	16.09%	25,652
23	Opera House	66.23%	Jayawantiben Navinchandra Mehta	JP	43,625	61.38%	Pramod Navalkar	SS	16,768	23.59%	26,857
24	Malabar Hill	55.41%	Balvantray Ambelal Desai	JP	37,016	48.85%	Murli Deora	INC	18,540	24.47%	18,476
25	Chinchpokli	55.89%	Kaviskar Suhas Tulaji	Independent	29,847	47.00%	Zute Bhikoba Dhondiba	Independent	13,469	21.21%	16,378
26	Nagpada	56.37%	Dr. Ishaq Jamkhanawala Abedin	JP	32,416	54.94%	Kazi Umar Abdul Aziz	INC	13,594	23.04%	18,822
27	Mazgaon	65.74%	Kamat Dinanath Gajanan	JP	30,120	47.13%	Bhosale Atmaram Tukaram	INC	12,698	19.87%	17,422
28	Parel	72.54%	Vasu Desai	JP	44,147	50.66%	Dattaji Salvi	SS	16,856	19.34%	27,291
29	Shivadi	66.26%	Kamble Devidas Pundlik	Independent	28,606	36.69%	Datta Nalavade	SS	15,532	19.92%	13,074
30	Worli	65.10%	Kurane Pralhad Krushna	CPI(M)	37,466	52.66%	Nanaware Vasant Pandurang	INC(I)	12,786	17.97%	24,680
31	Naigaon	69.68%	N. K. Sawant	JP	35,031	44.35%	Vamanrao Mahadik	SS	18,883	23.91%	16,148
32	Dadar	71.68%	Hemachandra Shankar Gupte	JP	38,879	46.22%	Manohar Joshi	SS	16,131	19.18%	22,748
33	Matunga	59.74%	Kohli Sohansingh Jodhsingh	JP	41,568	58.95%	Bhat Padma Subha	INC(I)	9,956	14.12%	31,612
34	Mahim	60.52%	Frederick Michael Pinto	JP	42,774	64.39%	Chitre P. M.	INC(I)	8,550	12.87%	34,224
35	Dharavi	54.40%	Satyendra More	CPI(M)	36,156	49.50%	Gaikwad Vishnu Babaji	INC	15,754	21.57%	20,402
36	Vandre	56.51%	Varde Sadanand Shankar	JP	44,245	67.95%	Pai Prabhakar Sanjeev	INC	9,882	15.18%	34,363
37	Kherwadi	66.63%	Ramdas Nayak	JP	36,851	50.99%	Ahmed B. Zakaria	INC	17,834	24.68%	19,017
38	Vile Parle	56.76%	Pranlal Vora	JP	46,382	66.60%	Pushpakant Anant Mhatre	INC	9,680	13.90%	36,702
39	Amboli	59.29%	Ramesh Sheth	JP	38,349	49.14%	Indulkar Pratap Mahadeo	INC(I)	17,965	23.02%	20,384
40	Santacruz	61.36%	Sinha Shobhanath Ramgajdhar	JP	42,544	53.24%	Pagraoot Vasantrao Dattatray	INC(I)	10,622	13.29%	31,922
41	Andheri	58.79%	Nilkant Samant	JP	37,585	44.79%	Sharma C. M.	INC(I)	18,838	22.45%	18,747
42	Goregaon	62.68%	Samant Padmakar Balkrishna	JP	49,529	63.83%	Desai Subhash Rajaram	SS	12,531	16.15%	36,998
43	Malad	57.47%	Kamal Desai	JP	47,429	56.90%	Joshi Mangelal Durga Prasad	INC(I)	14,693	17.63%	32,736
44	Kandivali	48.65%	Upadhyaya Hasmukhbhai Vasantray	JP	52,446	76.14%	Suryakant Matliya	INC	13,565	19.69%	38,881
45	Borivali	64.64%	Ram Naik	JP	60,510	67.26%	Patil Ramakant Parshuram	INC(I)	15,433	17.15%	45,077
46	Trombay	57.30%	S. Balakrishnan	RPI(K)	23,824	29.39%	Patil Amarnath Vaman	SS	22,399	27.63%	1,425
47	Chembur	62.75%	Hashu Advani	JP	43,028	56.32%	Rupavate Premchand Damodar	INC	19,297	25.26%	23,731
48	Nehrunagar	59.73%	Liyaqat Husain Ibarat Husain	JP	26,590	38.29%	Syed Suhail Asharaf	AIML	11,960	17.22%	14,630
49	Kurla	65.44%	Khan Shamsul Haq	JP	33,800	36.24%	Dutta Samant	INC	23,617	25.32%	10,183
50	Ghatkopar	64.75%	Parekh Jayantilal Ghambhirdas	JP	40,408	49.51%	Dadia Uttamchand Dosabhai	Independent	12,209	14.96%	28,199
51	Bhandup	66.89%	Sanzgiri Prabhakar Pandurang	CPI(M)	47,708	48.66%	Patil Dinanath Bama	INC	19,555	19.95%	28,153
52	Mulund	65.42%	Patwardhan Prabhakar Ramchandar	JP	56,061	58.94%	Trivedi Gaurishankar Satyanarayan	INC(I)	17,265	18.15%	38,796
53	Thane	67.97%	Gajanan Motiram Koli	JP	49,123	54.72%	Satish Pradhan	SS	20,231	22.54%	28,892
54	Belapur	61.66%	Bhoir Gautam Posha	JP	28,018	39.27%	Bhagat Balaji Kathod	INC(I)	14,214	19.92%	13,804
55	Ulhasnagar	63.67%	Harchandani Sitaldas Khub Chand	JP	39,309	56.91%	Ailani Parcharam Kewalram	AIFB	20,379	29.50%	18,930
56	Ambernath	58.94%	Jagannath Patil	JP	33,087	47.42%	Nakul Pundalik Patil	INC	23,470	33.64%	9,617
57	Kalyan	68.72%	Ramchandra Ganesh Kapse	JP	51,933	54.22%	Krishnarao Narayan Dhulap	PWPI	15,672	16.36%	36,261
58	Murbad	72.84%	Shantaram Gopal Gholap	INC	42,242	61.45%	Pharde Damodar Lahu	PWPI	24,792	36.07%	17,450
59	Wada	56.15%	Wani Somnath Rama	JP	28,989	46.51%	Kale Shankar Ladku	INC	17,047	27.35%	11,942
60	Bhiwandi	55.94%	Taware Parsharam Dhondu	Independent	20,774	29.47%	Hegde Prabhakar Madhavrao	INC(I)	18,600	26.39%	2,174
61	Vasai	74.98%	Chaudhari Pandharinath Raghunath	JP	49,163	58.03%	Tarabai Narsinh Vartak	INC	31,412	37.08%	17,751
62	Palghar	57.51%	Arjun Kakadya Shingade	JP	32,635	58.24%	Shelar Janardan Bhiwa	INC	16,934	30.22%	15,701
63	Dahanu	53.42%	Chavan Shankar Marya	CPI(M)	26,224	47.73%	Kadu Mahadeo Gopal	INC	21,514	39.16%	4,710
64	Jawhar	52.93%	Kurhada Barkya Lakhya	CPI(M)	29,934	54.08%	Bhoye Ramchandra Gopal	INC	17,284	31.23%	12,650
65	Shahapur	46.38%	Telam Krishnakant Ramachandra	PWPI	20,817	49.98%	Patil Balu Mahadu	INC	19,162	46.01%	1,655
66	Igatpuri	52.19%	Wagh Bhau Sakru	INC(I)	20,120	38.39%	Damse Madhavrao Sakharam	JP	12,850	24.52%	7,270
67	Nashik	62.80%	Upadhye Vasant Ganesh	JP	32,809	42.50%	Wavare Shantarambapu Kondaji	INC(I)	31,001	40.15%	1,808
68	Deolali	59.50%	Ahire Babulal Soma	Independent	37,821	60.54%	Reporte Baburao Bhagaji	RPI	14,688	23.51%	23,133
69	Sinnar	71.07%	Gadhak Suryabhan Sukdeo	Independent	36,255	52.42%	Avhad Nivrutti Mahadu	INC	23,205	33.55%	13,050
70	Niphad	74.96%	Patil Vinayakrao Pudlikrao	INC	51,315	68.52%	Boraste Madhavrao Kashiram	Independent	22,786	30.42%	28,529
71	Yevla	66.28%	Patil Janardan Deoram	Independent	24,434	37.05%	Bhokade Nivrutti Ramji	INC	20,804	31.55%	3,630
72	Nandgaon	65.51%	Nahar Kanhiyalal Chunilal	Independent	21,243	30.93%	Kavade Bhanudas Ramchandra	INC	21,000	30.57%	243
73	Malegaon	74.20%	Nihal Ahmed Maulavi Mohammed Usman	JP	47,237	56.57%	Gazi Naseem Ahmed Khan Md. Mardan	AIML	19,192	22.98%	28,045
74	Dabhadi	73.48%	Hiray Baliram Waman	INC(I)	32,918	46.95%	Patil Shivaji Namdeo	JP	25,036	35.71%	7,882
75	Chandwad	70.03%	Dawakhar Kisanrao Damodar	JP	23,168	35.77%	Deore Gyandeo Tukaram	RPI	20,836	32.17%	2,332
76	Dindori	57.08%	Gaikwad Bhagawant Dharmaji	INC(I)	23,321	41.61%	Amrita Kashiram Gaikwad	JP	12,101	21.59%	11,220
77	Surgana	51.35%	Jiva Pandu Gavit	CPI(M)	7,527	15.58%	Chavan Harischandra Deoram	Independent	6,932	14.35%	595
78	Kalwan	57.85%	Arjun Tulshiram Pawar	INC	31,218	58.33%	Bagul Babulal Hiraji	JP	11,885	22.21%	19,333
79	Baglan	66.91%	Pawar Laxman Totaram	INC(I)	30,992	49.93%	Pimpalse Vasantrao Bhuraji	JP	15,378	24.77%	15,614
80	Sakri	56.86%	Malusare Sukram Bhurya	INC(I)	19,569	33.25%	Choudhari Govindrao Shivram	INC	18,540	31.50%	1,029
81	Navapur	58.65%	Vasave Zina Samya	INC(I)	24,572	41.95%	Valvi Surupsing Fulji	INC	19,116	32.64%	5,456
82	Nandurbar	67.09%	Ramesh Panya Valvi	INC	42,526	58.56%	Natawadkar Jayant Ganpat	JP	30,095	41.44%	12,431
83	Talode	62.35%	Dilwarsing D. Padvi	JP	14,968	30.54%	Valvi Abhimanyu Nuraji	Independent	13,605	27.76%	1,363
84	Akrani	57.62%	Jadhav Shankar Fugara	JP	16,795	38.83%	Ukhalde Gosa Rupaji	INC	10,580	24.46%	6,215
85	Shahada	76.40%	Rawal Jaydevsinh Jaysinh	INC	33,554	43.80%	Patil Purushottam Kalu	JP	31,208	40.73%	2,346
86	Shirpur	76.21%	Pralhadrao Madhavrao Patil	JP	38,674	54.42%	Vyankatrao Tajani Randhir	INC	27,224	38.30%	11,450
87	Sindkheda	72.60%	Shisode Madhukarrao Dipchand	Independent	20,034	29.45%	Rajput Mangalsing Nimji Alias Thansing Jibhau	JP	17,956	26.40%	2,078
88	Kusumba	70.02%	Rohidas Chudaman Patil	INC(I)	31,873	46.50%	Mali Sadashiv Shankar	INC	13,498	19.69%	18,375
89	Dhule	66.18%	Khopade Kisanrao Manikrao	INC(I)	24,933	36.71%	Nerkar Hiraman Dhudaku	Independent	16,928	24.92%	8,005
90	Chalisgaon	56.51%	Dinakar Diwan Chavan	INC	34,144	54.91%	Jadhav Madhukar Gomaje	Independent	19,575	31.48%	14,569
91	Parola	67.93%	Uttamrao Patil	JP	40,965	53.14%	Patil Bhaskarrao Rajaram	INC	25,548	33.14%	15,417
92	Amalner	68.67%	Gulabrao Wamanrao Patil	JP	43,697	56.71%	Dabhade Ramdas Sugram	INC(I)	20,983	27.23%	22,714
93	Chopda	72.56%	Chaudhari Madhavrao Kautik	JP	23,637	36.04%	Patil Dhoundu Ukhaji	INC	23,322	35.56%	315
94	Erandol	72.06%	Patil Mahendrasinh Dharamsinh	JP	25,829	33.66%	Wagh Parvatabai Chandrabhan	INC(I)	19,267	25.11%	6,562
95	Jalgaon	66.70%	Ishwarlal Shankarlal Jain	INC(I)	30,099	40.31%	Shikh Mo. Ismail Ibrahim	JP	22,684	30.38%	7,415
96	Pachora	72.99%	Onkar Narayan Wagh	JP	43,130	55.29%	Patil Krishnarao Maharu	INC	34,878	44.71%	8,252
97	Jamner	66.22%	Gajananrao Raghunathrao Garud	Independent	15,955	24.88%	Narayan Sonaji Patil	INC	13,536	21.10%	2,419
98	Bhusawal	58.29%	Bhole Devidas Namdeo	INC	22,341	32.97%	Khadke Prakash Jagannath	INC(I)	15,362	22.67%	6,979
99	Yawal	68.36%	Choudhari Sindhu Parth	JP	24,021	36.29%	Tadvi Mirabai Dagekha	INC(I)	19,617	29.64%	4,404
100	Raver	76.14%	Mahukar Dhanaji Chaudhari	INC	26,961	36.19%	Sarode Gunwant Rambhau	JP	17,287	23.20%	9,674
101	Edlabad	73.03%	Pratibha Patil	INC	31,578	42.87%	Ashok Devidas Phadke	JP	30,879	41.92%	699
102	Malkapur	77.42%	Arjun Awadhut Wankhade	JP	34,663	45.95%	Mundhada Vinaykumar Premratan	INC(I)	29,406	38.98%	5,257
103	Buldhana	76.35%	Patil Shivajirao Bhiku	INC(I)	35,503	43.70%	Pawar Atmaram Totaram	Independent	26,152	32.19%	9,351
104	Chikhali	80.49%	Janardan Dattuappa Bondre	INC(I)	27,785	32.45%	Bharat Rajabhau Bondre	INC	27,607	32.24%	178
105	Sindkhed Raja	80.00%	Kharat Jayawantrao Kaluji	INC(I)	27,632	34.30%	Shingane Bhaskarrao Sampatrao	PWPI	20,112	24.96%	7,520
106	Mehkar	77.31%	Saoji Subodh Kesh Keshaosa	INC(I)	39,163	53.04%	Bajad Anant Tulshiram	Independent	16,848	22.82%	22,315
107	Khamgaon	71.42%	Pandurang Pundalik Fundkar	JP	25,831	32.26%	Gawande Manikrao Pralhadrao	INC	18,494	23.10%	7,337
108	Jalamb	72.46%	Dhokane Tulshiram Pandhari	PWPI	26,228	36.34%	Tapre Bhaurao Namdeorao	INC(I)	24,835	34.41%	1,393
109	Akot	78.02%	Gangane Sudhakar Ramkrishna	INC(I)	36,603	50.81%	Tidke Kashinath Shamrao	JP	24,096	33.45%	12,507
110	Borgaon Manju	71.48%	Apotikar Manikrao Ramchandra	INC(I)	44,990	61.12%	Patil Trimbak Pandhari	PWPI	19,938	27.08%	25,052
111	Akole	68.18%	Khan Mohammod Ajhar Hussein	INC(I)	36,853	51.14%	Jain Pramila W/O Shripal	JP	23,856	33.10%	12,997
112	Balapur	70.81%	Gujarathi Prakashchandra Alias Banduseth Nattulal	INC(I)	22,469	31.79%	Akbar Vakil Sheikh Abdar	JP	18,434	26.08%	4,035
113	Medshi	77.13%	Shinde Vitthalrao Kondaji	INC(I)	36,552	50.55%	Zanak Ramraoji Gopalrao	INC	19,224	26.58%	17,328
114	Washim	58.65%	Wankhede Bhaurao Nagorao	INC(I)	25,797	49.07%	Khobragade Bhaurao Nathuji	RPI(K)	12,548	23.87%	13,249
115	Mangrulpir	78.10%	Patil Anantkumar Kishanrao	PWPI	28,438	37.00%	Rathod Gajadhar Ramsing	INC	23,680	30.81%	4,758
116	Murtizapur	76.61%	Thakare Dhyandeorao Mukundrao	INC(I)	30,127	40.72%	Lahane Motiramji Udebhanji	JP	27,621	37.33%	2,506
117	Karanja	76.53%	Arvind Kamlakar Deshmukh	AIFB	38,584	56.00%	Korpe Wamanrao Ramkrushna Alias Dr. Annasaheb Korpe	PWPI	14,006	20.33%	24,578
118	Daryapur	78.37%	Bobde Shanarrao Krishana Rao	AIFB	38,021	52.19%	Gawai Vasantrao Suryabhanji	RPI	12,678	17.40%	25,343
119	Melghat	62.31%	Patel Ramu Mhatang	INC(I)	34,998	61.09%	Sarage Hiralal Onkar	JP	14,444	25.21%	20,554
120	Achalpur	75.53%	Bhokare Waman Rajirao	Independent	24,178	30.12%	Deshmukh Sudam Alias Waman Dattaraya	CPI	23,446	29.20%	732
121	Morshi	78.23%	Ande Manadeorao Sadashio	INC(I)	48,012	67.30%	Gandhi Girish Maniklalji	JP	9,895	13.87%	38,117
122	Teosa	78.34%	Thakur Chandrakant Ramchandra	Independent	41,455	59.84%	Mangle Natthuji Dewaji	CPI	14,965	21.60%	26,490
123	Walgaon	73.43%	Sable Bhau Bapurao	INC(I)	45,789	66.11%	Ingole Bhagwant Maroti	INC	10,259	14.81%	35,530
124	Amravati	66.44%	Bhuyar Surendra Chatrapal	INC(I)	38,507	50.60%	Munirkhan Usmankhan	JP	20,296	26.67%	18,211
125	Badnera	73.39%	Yadao Mangaldas Bholaram	INC(I)	40,828	58.87%	Dhepe Pravin Panjab	Independent	11,908	17.17%	28,920
126	Chandur	80.12%	Savalakhe Sudhakar Ramchandra	INC(I)	52,622	71.01%	Pratap Arunbhau Adsad	JP	12,656	17.08%	39,966
127	Arvi	77.99%	Chudiwal Shiochand Gowardhandas	Independent	64,168	70.92%	Wagh Dhairyashilrao Vinayakrao	JP	11,890	13.14%	52,278
128	Pulgaon	78.35%	Prabha Anand Rao	INC(I)	57,827	69.69%	Khobaragade Durwas Laluji	RPI(K)	15,310	18.45%	42,517
129	Wardha	76.31%	Pramod Bhauraoji Shende	INC(I)	52,266	64.43%	Ramchandra Ghangare Marot	CPI(M)	22,107	27.25%	30,159
130	Hinganghat	78.07%	Kolhe Deoraoji Zolbaji	INC(I)	56,668	60.86%	Hulke Pandharinath Vithobaji	RPI(K)	21,226	22.80%	35,442
131	Umred	70.10%	Dakate Purushottam Mansaram	INC(I)	43,171	55.99%	Darne Shrawan Domaji	Independent	12,527	16.25%	30,644
132	Kamthi	69.43%	Bhosle Tajsingrao Rajelaxmanrao	INC(I)	41,581	53.66%	Rai Rajni Kaushal Prasad	RPI(K)	16,090	20.76%	25,491
133	Nagpur North	67.32%	Dongre Suryakant Jagobaji	RPI(K)	34,598	46.16%	Wasnik Balkrishna Ramchandra	INC(I)	32,121	42.86%	2,477
134	Nagpur East	70.32%	Banwarilal Purohit	INC(I)	56,752	63.83%	Lendeprabhakar Natthu	Independent	12,023	13.52%	44,729
135	Nagpur South	74.22%	Vanjari Govindrao Marotrao	INC(I)	45,025	56.81%	Dhepe Ramanand Dewaji	RPI(K)	27,368	34.53%	17,657
136	Nagpur Central	73.45%	Surve Bhausaheb Sitaram	INC(I)	30,650	40.50%	Ram Hedau	JP	27,047	35.74%	3,603
137	Nagpur West	71.98%	Mulak Bhaurao Govindrao	INC(I)	45,625	52.49%	Suklikar Sumatibai Balkrishna	JP	33,531	38.57%	12,094
138	Kalmeshwar	77.22%	Gaikwad Bhagwantrao Manikrao	AIFB	55,202	71.00%	Wankhede Chandrashekhar Santoshrao	JP	11,879	15.28%	43,323
139	Katol	78.26%	Mankar Mukundrao Govindrao	INC(I)	36,800	51.15%	Pawade Motiram Gulabrao	JP	22,207	30.86%	14,593
140	Savner	75.83%	Naik Ramji Chiman	INC(I)	37,028	49.75%	Phate Shankerao Ramchandrarao	JP	24,034	32.29%	12,994
141	Ramtek	68.51%	Gunderao Fakiraji Mahajan	INC(I)	28,535	38.86%	Pandurang Jairamji Hajare	JP	23,350	31.80%	5,185
142	Tumsar	80.00%	Karemore Subhashchandra Narayanraoji	INC(I)	33,490	43.41%	Patel Ishwardayal Mahipalji	JP	15,982	20.72%	17,508
143	Bhandara	79.46%	Dube Vithalprasad Sitaram	INC(I)	30,621	40.89%	Shende Govinda (Dada) Ramji	INC	22,230	29.69%	8,391
144	Adyar	75.71%	Tighare Vitthalrao Sakharamji	INC(I)	29,993	39.20%	Katekhaye Ramkrishana Zibalji	Independent	19,177	25.06%	10,816
145	Tirora	73.62%	Wasnik Laxminarayan Ganpat	INC(I)	40,768	50.79%	Meshram Nagorao Shrawan	RPI(K)	27,005	33.64%	13,763
146	Gondiya	70.79%	Rajkumari Gopalnarayan Bajpayee	INC(I)	39,729	51.88%	Agrawal Radheshyam Harishchandra	JP	21,033	27.47%	18,696
147	Goregaon	79.20%	Nagpure Girjashankarsingh Hemrajsingh	INC(I)	42,796	54.58%	Puranlal Dharmabhan Rahangdale	JP	32,240	41.12%	10,556
148	Amgaon	68.71%	Mahadeo Shivankar	JP	35,727	47.38%	Bhaktawarti Dayaram Dashrath	INC(I)	29,197	38.72%	6,530
149	Sakoli	81.49%	Bedarkar Madukar Tulshiramji	INC(I)	39,908	45.40%	Kapgate Shamrao Pagaji	JP	36,093	41.06%	3,815
150	Lakhandur	78.74%	Bhaiyya Hiralal Nathmalji	INC(I)	38,157	43.34%	Diwathe Namdeo Harbaji	JP	33,595	38.16%	4,562
151	Armori	64.81%	Narnaware Dinaji Vithobaji	Independent	30,374	46.52%	Weakey Sukhadeobabu Pundalik	Independent	19,384	29.69%	10,990
152	Gadchiroli	62.75%	Madavi Dewaji Tanu	INC(I)	26,485	44.31%	Atram Satyawanrao Raje Vishweshwarrao	Independent	24,396	40.82%	2,089
153	Sironcha	60.35%	Meshram Bhagwanshaha Jiwanshaha	Independent	41,667	81.14%	Talandi Penta Rama	INC	5,283	10.29%	36,384
154	Rajura	66.54%	Musale Baburao Janardhan	JP	30,786	43.11%	Mamulkar Prabhakar Bapurao	Independent	24,873	34.83%	5,913
155	Chandrapur	70.20%	Nareshkumar Chunnalal Puglia	INC(I)	38,018	47.44%	Dumbere Rajaram Tulsiram	RPI(K)	24,857	31.02%	13,161
156	Saoli	77.29%	Bhandekar Deorao Bhayyaji	INC(I)	28,466	36.62%	Dada Deshkar Vakil	JP	23,862	30.69%	4,604
157	Bramhapuri	77.83%	Bhendarkar Baburao Shrawanji	INC(I)	54,717	61.37%	Kamble Marotrao Rakhaduji	RPI	22,053	24.74%	32,664
158	Chimur	78.68%	Sonwane Adkuji Shiwaji	INC(I)	55,117	60.77%	Korekar Gopalrao Keshaorao	JP	24,431	26.94%	30,686
159	Bhadrawati	72.28%	Nilkanthrao Yeshwantrao Shinde	INC(I)	45,475	53.29%	Temurde Moreshwar Vithalrao	JP	23,016	26.97%	22,459
160	Wani	75.58%	Bapurao Harbaji Panghate	INC(I)	50,142	67.59%	Dada Sitaram Nandekar	Independent	13,497	18.19%	36,645
161	Ralegaon	68.25%	Dhurve Sudhakarrao Bakaram	INC(I)	57,404	79.19%	Kerzerkar Digambar Haribhau	INC	5,666	7.82%	51,738
162	Kelapur	74.59%	Masram Lakhuji Marotrao	INC(I)	44,846	67.14%	Wagh Purushottam Vithalrao	JP	14,916	22.33%	29,930
163	Yavatmal	74.68%	Jambhuwantrao Bapurao Dhote	Independent	55,608	73.78%	Gilani Walimohammed Noormohammed	JP	15,654	20.77%	39,954
164	Darwha	76.63%	Mandhana Harish Rameshwar	Independent	45,194	59.55%	Ghuikhedkar Vishwasrao Balkrushna	INC	18,218	24.00%	26,976
165	Digras	78.46%	Nanabhau Narayanrao Yembadwar	Independent	49,051	59.48%	Shivajirao Moghe	INC	15,846	19.22%	33,205
166	Pusad	81.11%	Sudhakarrao Rajusing Naik	INC	43,485	53.29%	Paul Vasantrao Deorao	JP	31,958	39.16%	11,527
167	Umarkhed	80.02%	Deosarkar Anantrao Apparao	INC	34,805	44.16%	Jahagirdar M. Amanulla M. Ibadulla	JP	25,803	32.74%	9,002
168	Kinwat	75.85%	Uttamrao Baliram Rathod	INC	27,765	41.22%	Pachute Kishanrao Champatrao	INC(I)	20,902	31.03%	6,863
169	Hadgaon	73.41%	Pawar Niwruttirao Mahadji	JP	29,107	39.21%	Shinde Bapurao Shiwram	INC	29,101	39.20%	6
170	Nanded	61.24%	Noorallah Khan Bismillah Khan	JP	25,823	35.21%	M. Maqbool Salim Mohammed Khaja	AIML	19,981	27.24%	5,842
171	Mudkhed	63.01%	Chandrakant Govindrao Maski	JP	25,568	39.02%	Sirsat Sambhajirao Ramji	Independent	15,481	23.63%	10,087
172	Bhokar	71.31%	Shankarrao Chavan	Independent	34,896	50.77%	Deshmukh Balajirao Gopalrao	INC	23,645	34.40%	11,251
173	Biloli	64.37%	Patne Gangadhar Mahalappa	JP	41,887	49.59%	Chavan Balwantrao Amrutrao	INC	33,116	39.21%	8,771
174	Mukhed	49.76%	Ghate Madhukarrao Rangoji	Independent	24,802	42.38%	Ravangaonkar Nagnathrao Satwaji	Independent	12,864	21.98%	11,938
175	Kandhar	57.93%	Kurude Gurunathrao Manikrao	PWPI	29,825	42.17%	Bhoshikar Ishwar Rao Narayanrao	INC	19,422	27.46%	10,403
176	Gangakhed	45.89%	Gaikwad Dnyanoba Hari	PWPI	16,961	37.99%	Nandapurkar Satwaji Sadbaji	RPI	13,663	30.61%	3,298
177	Singnapur	57.75%	Gawali Uttamrao Abaji	INC	18,860	32.48%	Jadhav Manikrao Kishanrao	PWPI	12,881	22.18%	5,979
178	Parbhani	61.75%	Jamkar Raosaheb Bapusaheb	INC	25,700	41.50%	Gauhane Annasaheb Ramchandrarao	PWPI	23,616	38.13%	2,084
179	Basmath	57.74%	Panditrao Ramrao Deshmukh	JP	25,583	41.32%	Kusale Narayanrao Girjaji	INC	16,135	26.06%	9,448
180	Kalamnuri	60.78%	Maske Vithlrao Champatrao Naik	CPI(M)	37,911	59.25%	Deshmukh Shiwajirao Shankarrao	INC	17,972	28.09%	19,939
181	Hingoli	64.57%	Galande Dagduji Yeshwantrao	JP	27,723	40.55%	Deshmukh Sahebrao Shankarrao	INC(I)	27,602	40.37%	121
182	Jintur	53.76%	Gulabchand Nandlaji Rathi	PWPI	17,247	31.62%	Manikrao Keshavrao Bhamble	INC(I)	16,621	30.48%	626
183	Pathri	59.18%	Sakhram Gopalrao Nakhate	INC	14,455	27.79%	Dakh Baba Saheb Marotrao	INC(I)	12,845	24.70%	1,610
184	Partur	63.23%	Borade Ramprasadji Vithalrao	INC(I)	19,296	31.49%	Sarkate Indrajit Ganpatrao	JP	13,057	21.31%	6,239
185	Ambad	60.76%	Bapusaheb Sakharam Solunke	JP	26,180	37.98%	Ankushrao Raosaheb Tope	INC	18,993	27.55%	7,187
186	Jalna	60.49%	Kisanrao Pandharnath Bhise	INC(I)	32,707	49.46%	Syed Abdul Majeed Syed Abdul Hakim	JP	15,499	23.44%	17,208
187	Badnapur	60.99%	Kolkar Shankarrao Limbajirao	INC(I)	23,466	35.91%	Bundele Shankarsing Ghagansing	JP	13,429	20.55%	10,037
188	Bhokardan	64.79%	Vithalrao Ramsing Patil	JP	32,990	47.44%	Hanumantrao Gawanji Sawant	INC(I)	17,185	24.71%	15,805
189	Sillod	67.41%	Gadekar Namdeo Balwantrao	JP	21,436	35.01%	Manikrao Palodkar Sandu	INC	19,327	31.56%	2,109
190	Kannad	63.01%	Tukaram Shankar Patil	JP	31,450	45.45%	Pandurang Shenphadu	INC	24,075	34.79%	7,375
191	Vaijapur	57.03%	Uttamrao Keshavrao Patwari ( Bhalerao )	JP	19,376	34.28%	Balwantrao Alias Balasaheb Ramrao Pawar	INC	18,740	33.16%	636
192	Gangapur	49.01%	Laxman Eknath Manal	INC	26,128	44.88%	Asaram Sakharam	JP	12,251	21.04%	13,877
193	Aurangabad West	63.08%	Abdul Azim Abdul Hameed	INC(I)	42,716	50.90%	Kashinath Navander	JP	27,230	32.45%	15,486
194	Aurangabad East	60.14%	Gawande Rambhau Eknath	JP	33,414	47.01%	Keshaorao Vishwanath Awatade	INC(I)	31,606	44.46%	1,808
195	Paithan	63.58%	Bhaurao Abaji Thorat	JP	16,355	27.22%	Shivajirao Sahebrao	INC(I)	14,813	24.66%	1,542
196	Georai	64.87%	Shivajirao Ankushrao	INC	38,539	58.10%	Mindhe Ramrao Raosaheb	JP	23,590	35.56%	14,949
197	Majalgaon	69.92%	Prakashdada Solanke	INC	43,762	52.89%	Bapusaheb Eknathrao	CPI(M)	35,743	43.20%	8,019
198	Beed	54.79%	Nawle Aadinath Limbaji	JP	27,069	43.20%	Kshirsagar Kesharbai Sonajirao	INC	14,499	23.14%	12,570
199	Ashti	59.16%	Jadhav Laxmanrao Vithoba	INC	20,135	27.55%	Jagtap Asrajirao Raoji	JP	17,677	24.19%	2,458
200	Chausala	54.15%	Kokate Baburao Narsingrao	INC	32,681	47.57%	Kadam Dnyanobarao Baburao	PWPI	28,329	41.24%	4,352
201	Kaij	40.37%	Bhagoji Nivruttirao Satpute	Independent	19,010	39.78%	Shamrao Laxmanrao Thorat	Independent	13,154	27.53%	5,856
202	Renapur	66.56%	Raghunathrao Munde	INC	36,468	48.41%	Gopinath Pandurang Munde	JP	32,485	43.12%	3,983
203	Ahmedpur	65.21%	Deshmukh Kishanrao Nanasaheb	PWPI	29,325	46.15%	Nagargoje Bhagwanrao Kerbaji	INC	26,612	41.88%	2,713
204	Udgir	65.38%	Jadhav Balasaheb Kishanrao	INC	24,455	34.96%	Patwari Manohar Digambarrao	PWPI	19,482	27.85%	4,973
205	Her	53.11%	Kamble Trimbak Pandurang	Independent	14,351	28.58%	Khadiwale Vithalrao Bapurao	INC	13,284	26.45%	1,067
206	Latur	72.32%	Shivraj Vishwanath Patil	INC	39,809	45.12%	Gomare Manoharrao Eknathrao	JP	36,806	41.72%	3,003
207	Kalamb	56.70%	Ghodke Kundlik Eknath	PWPI	19,982	35.94%	S. K. Kadam	RPI	16,431	29.55%	3,551
208	Paranda	62.39%	Vasudeo Anandrao Deshmukh	JP	22,947	34.83%	Subrao Mohanrao Patil	INC	21,428	32.52%	1,519
209	Osmanabad	68.64%	Dr. Padamsinh Bajirao Patil	INC	29,949	42.53%	Balbhimrao Narsing Rao Deshmukh	PWPI	20,433	29.01%	9,516
210	Ausa	71.09%	Keshavrao Sonawane	INC	19,321	30.34%	Patil Madhavrao Santram	Independent	18,393	28.88%	928
211	Nilanga	77.19%	Shivajirao Patil Nilangekar	INC	41,664	49.10%	Shripatrao Gyanurao Solunke	PWPI	35,955	42.37%	5,709
212	Omerga	72.30%	Chalukya Bhaskarrao Shivram Pant	INC	35,327	46.69%	Kasture Vishwanath Baslingappa	JP	29,560	39.07%	5,767
213	Tuljapur	70.65%	Khaple Manikrao Bhimrao	PWPI	28,438	47.46%	Patil Shivajirao Shahajirao ( Babhalgaonkar )	INC	18,072	30.16%	10,366
214	Akkalkot	74.11%	Patel Inayatalli Imamsaheb	JP	35,305	53.19%	Mane Baburao Tulshiram	INC	19,692	29.67%	15,613
215	Solapur South	71.39%	Anandrao Narayan Devkate	INC(I)	24,458	39.03%	Patil Gurunath Shivappa	JP	24,009	38.31%	449
216	Solapur City South	68.10%	Rone Bhimrao Laxmanrao	JP	22,085	34.77%	Kuchan Rajaram Sidramappa	INC(I)	21,731	34.21%	354
217	Solapur City North	68.18%	Adam Narsayya Narayan	CPI(M)	20,372	31.28%	Dikonda Vithalrao Sayanna	INC(I)	17,123	26.29%	3,249
218	North Sholapur	62.16%	Sushilkumar Sambhaji Shinde	INC	25,795	45.59%	Ranshrungare Ramchandra Sakharam	INC(I)	14,624	25.85%	11,171
219	Mangalwedha	44.12%	Kamble Nivrutti Satwaji	RPI	12,379	28.83%	Dange Rambhajirao Alias Annasaheb Amabaji	Independent	8,774	20.43%	3,605
220	Mohol	76.27%	Shahjiroa Shankarrao Patil	INC(I)	26,771	39.82%	Nimbalkar Chandrakant Dattaji	PWPI	21,863	32.52%	4,908
221	Barshi	76.17%	Deshmukh Krishanarao Nanasaheb	INC	34,859	50.59%	Surana Pannalal Premraj	JP	29,067	42.19%	5,792
222	Madha	65.50%	Parbat Krishnarao Kondiba	Independent	25,076	37.21%	Sampatrao Maruti Patil	PWPI	22,308	33.11%	2,768
223	Pandharpur	75.80%	Audumber Kondiba Patil	INC	39,205	49.52%	Paricharak Sudhakar Ramchandra	JP	35,543	44.89%	3,662
224	Sangola	65.36%	Ganpatrao Abasaheb Deshmukh	PWPI	47,625	63.69%	Ghadage Bajirao Dadasaheb	INC	26,067	34.86%	21,558
225	Malshiras	80.80%	Pati Shamrao Bhimrao	JP	48,473	56.05%	Shankarrao Mohite-Patil	INC	37,025	42.81%	11,448
226	Karmala	74.11%	Namdeo Mahadeo Jagtap	INC	31,589	51.94%	Devi Girdhadas Vithaldas	JP	27,101	44.56%	4,488
227	Karjat	59.02%	Kamble Bajirao Dashrath	RPI	23,157	41.42%	Bharaskar Baburao Madhadev	JP	23,133	41.37%	24
228	Shrigonda	65.51%	Nagwade Shivajirao Narayan	INC	40,102	58.24%	Gade Mohanrao Abaji	JP	27,054	39.29%	13,048
229	Ahmednagar South	68.83%	Kumar Saptarshi	JP	19,039	27.92%	Paulbudhe Nath Jaywant	INC	18,691	27.41%	348
230	Ahmednagar North	66.90%	Shelke Maruti Deoram	Independent	35,820	47.62%	Mhaske Kisanrao Balaji	INC	19,177	25.49%	16,643
231	Pathardi	63.84%	Babanrao Dhakne	JP	37,134	54.55%	Khedkar Yadavrao Sonarao	INC	26,735	39.28%	10,399
232	Shegaon	71.19%	Langhe Vakilrao Baburao	CPI	23,872	35.19%	Nimbalkar Eknath Buvasaheb	INC	22,877	33.72%	995
233	Shrirampur	79.16%	Govindrao Wamanrao Adik	INC	35,009	49.81%	Tekawade Janardanrao Yashwantrao	JP	29,086	41.39%	5,923
234	Shirdi	71.02%	Ghogare Chandrabhan Bhausaheb	INC	30,874	50.92%	Mhaske Annasaheb Sarangdhar	JP	20,656	34.07%	10,218
235	Kopargaon	77.48%	Shankarrao Genuji Kolhe	INC	40,414	57.11%	Jadhav Panditrao Gangadhar	JP	27,274	38.54%	13,140
236	Rahuri	72.04%	Pawar Kashinath Laxman	INC	29,866	45.69%	Kadam Laxman Balwant	JP	23,006	35.19%	6,860
237	Parner	68.69%	Shankarrao Kale	INC	19,781	34.00%	Thube Prabhakar Appaji	CPI	18,537	31.86%	1,244
238	Sangamner	75.35%	Vijay Bhausaheb Thorat	INC	33,627	43.68%	B. J. Khatal-Patil	JP	32,526	42.25%	1,101
239	Nagar–Akola	57.97%	Ashok Yashwant Bhangare	INC	25,636	37.89%	Deshmukh Eknath Shankar	JP	13,718	20.28%	11,918
240	Junnar	64.02%	Krishna Ramji Mundhe	INC	29,017	44.72%	Jagdish Phule	JP	28,297	43.61%	720
241	Ambegaon	61.78%	Kale B. D.	INC	24,542	48.07%	Temgire Kisan Shripati	JP	23,967	46.94%	575
242	Khed Alandi	60.78%	Kandge Ram Janardan	INC	23,646	35.21%	Bachche Namdev Krishna	JP	14,393	21.43%	9,253
243	Maval	71.86%	Bhegade Krishnarao Dhondiaba	INC	38,514	53.89%	Bhegade Nathubhau Baburao	JP	29,181	40.83%	9,333
244	Mulshi	64.01%	Mate Namdev Ramkrishanrao	INC	33,530	53.28%	Khilare Diwakar Jaisingrao	JP	27,222	43.26%	6,308
245	Haveli	63.12%	Phuge Sopan Tukaram	JP	41,325	48.97%	Landage Dnyaneshwar Pandurang	INC	30,424	36.05%	10,901
246	Bopodi	61.29%	L. T. Sawant	Independent	21,750	41.18%	Kadam Shashikant Rajaram	INC(I)	18,473	34.97%	3,277
247	Shivajinagar	67.93%	Shanti Narayan Naik	JP	48,696	56.38%	Suresh Kalmadi	INC	36,393	42.14%	12,303
248	Parvati	62.20%	Subhash Sarvagod	JP	39,504	48.82%	Matre Shankarrao Gopalrao	INC	21,748	26.87%	17,756
249	Kasba Peth	74.96%	Arvind Lele	JP	52,190	60.96%	Ulhas Shedge	INC	28,410	33.18%	23,780
250	Bhavani Peth	67.63%	Bhalchandra Vaidya	JP	34,586	47.69%	Kirad M. H. Alias Babanrao	INC	19,827	27.34%	14,759
251	Pune Cantonment	66.57%	Vitthal Tupe	JP	34,737	52.29%	Jaisingh Ganpat Sasane	INC	30,251	45.54%	4,486
252	Shirur	64.33%	Daundkar Baburao Bhausaheb	JP	32,727	56.40%	Palande Suryakant Gulabrao	INC	25,299	43.60%	7,428
253	Daund	65.56%	Takawane Rajaram Bajirao	JP	26,940	34.33%	Krishna Rama Thorat	INC	18,662	23.78%	8,278
254	Indapur	73.75%	Shankarrao Bajirao Patil	INC	40,332	49.65%	Avate Ganapt Abaji	Independent	28,543	35.14%	11,789
255	Baramati	80.40%	Sharad Pawar	INC	49,685	59.96%	More Vijay Hanumantrao	JP	31,047	37.47%	18,638
256	Purandar	66.59%	Dada Jadhav	JP	35,053	46.69%	Usral Shankarrao Dashrathrao	INC	32,267	42.97%	2,786
257	Bhor	73.83%	Jedhe Sampatrao Ramchandra	Independent	27,225	42.58%	Anantrao Narayan Thopate	INC	26,727	41.80%	498
258	Phaltan	75.77%	Vijaysinh Alias Shivajiraje Malojirao Naik Nimbalkar	JP	32,011	43.46%	Kadam Suryajirao Shankarrao Alias Chimanrao	INC	30,539	41.46%	1,472
259	Man	58.04%	Sonavane Vishnu Tatoba	INC	31,541	50.63%	Lavangare Nitin Jagannath	JP	19,622	31.50%	11,919
260	Khatav	77.79%	Patil Keshavrao Shankarrao	INC	42,404	56.29%	Patil Chnandrahar Alias Ramchandra Ganpatrao	JP	26,742	35.50%	15,662
261	Koregaon	74.29%	Jagtap Shankarrao Chimaji	INC	30,765	43.62%	Pandurang Nilkanthrao Alias Babasaheb Mane	Independent	24,745	35.08%	6,020
262	Wai	75.10%	Prataprao Baburao Bhosale	INC	37,899	56.00%	Jagtap Buvasaheb Abajirao	JP	15,990	23.63%	21,909
263	Jaoli	68.96%	Bnilare Bhiku Daji	INC	23,217	31.25%	Sabale Balkrishna Anant	Independent	19,123	25.74%	4,094
264	Satara	70.79%	Abhaysinh Shahumaharaj Bhosale	JP	37,549	50.12%	Ghorpade Baburao Balasaheb	INC	30,263	40.39%	7,286
265	Patan	70.94%	Daulatrao Shripatrao Desai	JP	54,312	73.28%	Desai Bhagvantrao Anandrao	INC(I)	13,378	18.05%	40,934
266	Karad North	71.59%	Keshavrao Patloji Pawar	PWPI	35,141	46.53%	Kotwal Baburao Ramchandra	INC	26,843	35.54%	8,298
267	Karad South	71.78%	Yashwantrao Jijoba Mohite	INC	48,885	63.86%	Mohite Shankarrao Pandurangrao	PWPI	22,228	29.04%	26,657
268	Shirala	77.49%	Shivajirao Bapusaheb Deshmukh	Independent	42,871	51.32%	Patil Rajaram Yashwant	INC	28,076	33.61%	14,795
269	Walva	82.43%	Shinde Vilasrao Bhauso	INC	38,449	41.92%	Rajaram Anand Patil	JP	28,637	31.23%	9,812
270	Bhilwadi Wangi	79.07%	Sampatrao Annasaheb Chavan	INC	43,419	52.19%	Lad Ganpati Dada	PWPI	21,097	25.36%	22,322
271	Sangli	76.45%	Vasantrao Banduji Patil	INC	48,762	64.95%	Khot Bharamgonda Apuraya	JP	20,204	26.91%	28,558
272	Miraj	75.21%	Shinde Mohanrao Alias Ramsing Ganpatrao	INC	42,670	60.42%	Naikwadi Iliyas Yusuf	JP	21,510	30.46%	21,160
273	Tasgaon	74.54%	Dinkarrao (Aba) Krishnaji Patil	INC	45,178	62.22%	Vasudev Daji Jadhav	JP	14,471	19.93%	30,707
274	Khanapur Atpadi	67.37%	Salunkhe Sahajirao Ganapatrao	INC	30,695	43.02%	Deshmukh Babasaheb Alias Rastumrao Chitrojirao	Independent	16,674	23.37%	14,021
275	Kavathe Mahankal	70.69%	Vitthal Shripati Patil	INC	45,278	60.44%	Appasaheb Gannapati Sagare	JP	25,103	33.51%	20,175
276	Jat	52.38%	Sohani Jayant Ishawar	INC	22,040	41.19%	Sankpal Dilip Pandurang	Independent	17,570	32.83%	4,470
277	Shirol	82.48%	Dr. Ratnappa Bharamappa Kumbhar	INC	44,205	50.72%	Yadav Dinkarrao Bhausaheb	PWPI	31,756	36.44%	12,449
278	Ichalkaranji	78.24%	Patil Shivagonda Pirgonda	CPI(M)	38,206	43.86%	Kallappa Baburao Awade	INC	25,686	29.49%	12,520
279	Vadgaon	62.31%	Mane Nanasaheb Shantaram	JP	25,835	38.04%	Samudre Jagannath Sitaram	Independent	24,167	35.58%	1,668
280	Shahuwadi	78.82%	Udaysingrao Nanasaheb Gaikwad	INC	53,625	69.33%	Patil Sadashiv Shankar	JP	14,280	18.46%	39,345
281	Panhala	74.07%	Patil Yeshwant Eknath	INC	34,735	52.51%	Patil Shankarrao Dattatraya (Shingnapurkar)	JP	14,580	22.04%	20,155
282	Sangrul	82.68%	Bondre Shripatrao Shankarrao	INC	42,835	51.91%	Kalikate Govindrao Tukaram	PWPI	32,996	39.98%	9,839
283	Radhanagari	82.34%	Jadhav Dinkerrao Bhauso	INC	29,397	33.50%	Patil Shankar Dhondi	JP	27,435	31.27%	1,962
284	Kolhapur	74.21%	Sabnis Ravindra Ramchandra	JP	23,877	30.49%	Salokhe Hindurao Krishnarao	PWPI	18,904	24.14%	4,973
285	Karvir	73.50%	Patil Rajaram Babaji	INC	27,329	34.02%	Patil Dayandeo Yashwant	JP	22,874	28.47%	4,455
286	Kagal	84.87%	Ghatage Vikramsinh Jayasingrao	Independent	35,913	45.12%	Mandlik Sadashiv Dadoba	Independent	24,479	30.76%	11,434
287	Gadhinglaj	80.69%	Ghali Shivaling Shivayogi	INC(I)	25,432	32.07%	Batkadli Nagapa Gurlingapa	INC	24,389	30.76%	1,043
288	Chandgad	78.20%	Vithalrao Bhairu Patil	Independent	27,556	36.53%	Narsingrao Gurunath Patil	INC	26,749	35.46%	807
