= 1999 Maharashtra Legislative Assembly election =

Maharashtra Legislative Assembly Election 1999
- 5, 11 September 1999

All 288 assembly constituencies 145 seats needed for a majority
- Turnout: 60.95% (▼10.74%)

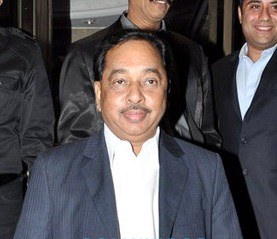

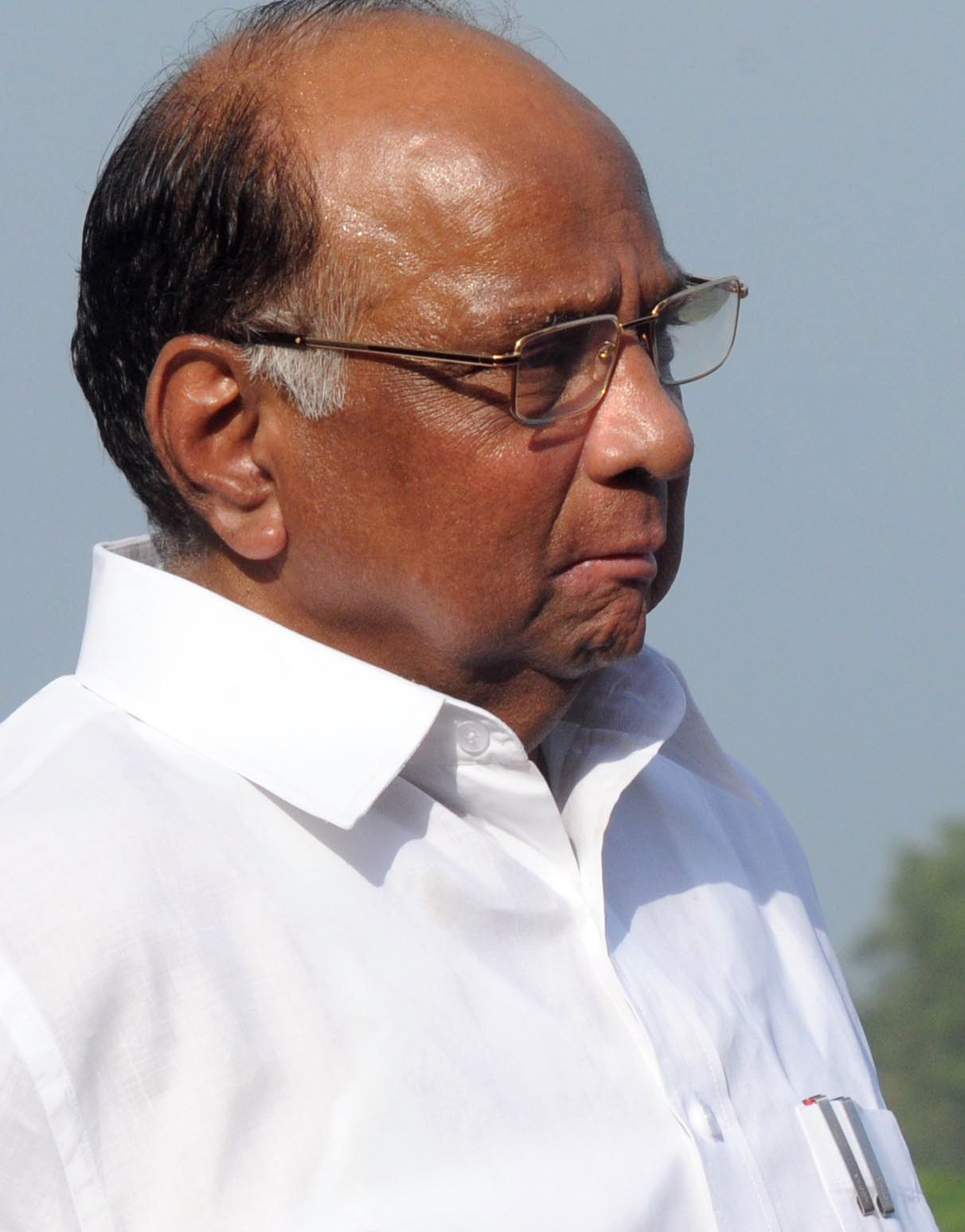

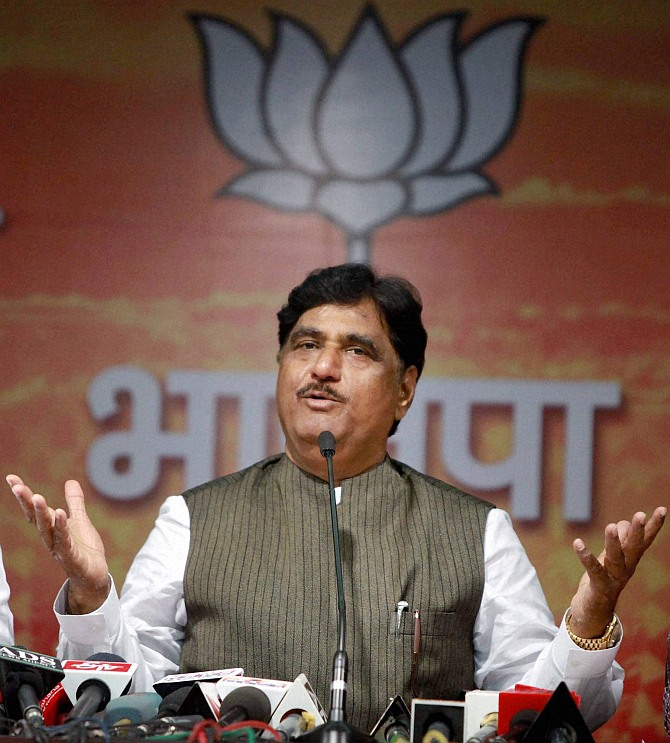
	First party	Second party
Leader	Vilasrao Deshmukh	Narayan Rane
Party	INC	SS
Alliance	INC+	NDA
Leader's seat	Latur City	Malvan
Last election	80	73 seats, 16.39%
Seats won	75	69
Seat change	▼5	▼4
Popular vote	8,937,043	5,692,812
Percentage	27.20%	17.33%
Swing	▼3.80%	▲0.64%
	Third party	Fourth party
Leader	Sharad Pawar	Gopinath Munde
Party	NCP	BJP
Alliance	NCP+	NDA
Leader's seat	Did not contest	Renapur
Last election	New	65 seats, 12.80%
Seats won	58	56
Seat change	New	▼9
Popular vote	7,425,427	4,776,301
Percentage	22.60%	14.54%
Swing	New	▲1.74%
Chief Minister before election
Narayan Rane
SS
Elected Chief Minister
Vilasrao Deshmukh
INC

Assembly elections was held in Maharashtra, India in two phases on September 5, 1999, and September 11, 1999. Election results were declared on October 7, 1999. The major parties were Bharatiya Janata Party - Shiv Sena (Yuti) alliance, Congress and NCP. Congress and NCP contested against each other without a pre-poll alliance but came together for a post-poll alliance to stake claim to form the government. Vilasrao Deshmukh of Congress became Chief Minister, and NCP's Chhagan Bhujbal became Deputy CM.

Lok Sabha elections were held simultaneously, and in them, the BJP-Sena alliance fared better winning 28/48, with Shiv Sena winning 15 seats, BJP 13 seats, Congress 10 seats, and NCP 6 seats.

== Election schedule ==
The polling schedule for the 1999 General Elections and assembly elections was announced by the Chief Election Commissioner on 11 July 1999.

Poll event	Phase	
Poll event	I	II
Notification date	11 August 1999	17 August 1999
Last date for filing nomination	18 August 1999	24 August 1999
Scrutiny of nomination	19 August 1999	25 August 1999
Last Date for withdrawal of nomination	21 August 1999	27 August 1999
Date of poll	5 September 1999	11 September 1999
Date of counting of votes/Result	6 October 1999	
No. of constituencies	144	144

== Parties ==
List of Political Parties participated in 1999 Maharashtra Assembly Elections.

Party	Abbreviation
National Parties
Bharatiya Janata Party	BJP
Indian National Congress	INC
Janata Dal (United)	JD(U)
Janata Dal (Secular)	JD(S)
Communist Party of India (Marxist)	CPM
Communist Party of India	CPI
Bahujan Samaj Party	BSP
State Parties
Shiv Sena	SHS
Nationalist Congress Party	NCP
Janata Party	JP
Rashtriya Janata Dal	RJD
Samajwadi Party	SP
All India Forward Bloc	AIFB
Republican Party of India	RPI
All India Anna Dravida Munnetra Kazhagam	AIADMK
Registered (Unrecognised) Parties
Akhil Bharatiya Hindu Mahasabha	HMS
All India Majlis-E-Ittehadul Muslimeen	AIMIM
Indian Union Muslim League	IUML
Swatantra Bharat Paksha	STBP
Akhil Bharatiya Sena	ABHS
Ajeya Bharat Party	AJBP
Maharashtra Rashtravadi Congress	MRC
Hindustan Janata Party	HJP
Samajwadi Janata Party (Maharashtra)	SJP(M)
Samajwadi Jan Parishad	SWJP
Peasants and Workers Party	PWP
Republican Party of India (Khobragade)	RPI(K)
Bharipa Bahujan Mahasangh	BBM
Bharatiya Minorities Suraksha Mahasangh	BMSM
National Loktantrik Party	NLP
National Minorities Party	NMP
Nag Vidarbha Andolan Samiti	NVAS
Gondwana Ganatantra Party	GGP
Native People's Party	NVPP
Abhinav Bharat Sangh	ABS
Bharatiya Rajiv Congress	BRC
Maharashtra Vikas Congress	MVC
Bahujan Rashtriya Party	BRAP
The Humanist Party of India	THPI

== Results ==
Summary of results of the Maharashtra State Assembly election, 1999

Political Party	Seats			Popular Vote		
Political Party	Contested	Won	Change +/-	Votes polled	Votes%	Change +/-
Indian National Congress 75 / 288 (26%)	249	75	▼5	8,937,043	27.20%	▼3.80%
Shiv Sena 69 / 288 (24%)	161	69	▼4	5,692,812	17.33%	▲0.94%
Nationalist Congress Party 58 / 288 (20%)	223	58	▲58	7,425,427	22.60%	▲22.60% (New Party)
Bharatiya Janata Party 56 / 288 (19%)	117	56	▼9	4,776,301	14.54%	▲1.74%
Peasants and Workers Party of India 5 / 288 (2%)	22	5	▼1	490,535	1.49%	▼0.56%
Bharipa Bahujan Mahasangh 3 / 288 (1%)	34	3	▲3	606,827	1.85%	▼1.18%
Janata Dal (Secular) 2 / 288 (0.7%)	25	2	▼9 (from JD seats)	497,127	1.51%	▼4.35% (from JD vote share)
Samajwadi Party 2 / 288 (0.7%)	15	2	▼1	227,640	0.69%	▼0.24%
Communist Party of India (Marxist) 2 / 288 (0.7%)	23	2	▼1	210,030	0.64%	▼0.36%
Republican Party of India 1 / 288 (0.3%)	10	1	▲1	226,481	0.69%	▲0.54%
Gondwana Ganatantra Party 1 / 288 (0.3%)	16	1	▲1	67,138	0.20%	▲0.20% (New Party)
Native People's Party 1 / 288 (0.3%)	1	1	▲1	63,931	0.19%	▲0.19%
Samajwadi Janata Party (Maharashtra) 1 / 288 (0.3%)	5	1	▲1	43,870	0.13%	▼0.01%
Maharashtra Vikas Congress	2	0	▼1	31,173	0.09%	▼0.03%
Nag Vidarbha Andolan Samiti	4	0	▼1	26,966	0.08%	▼0.13%
Independents 12 / 288 (4%)	837	12	▼33	3,116,564	9.49%	▼14.14%
Total	2006	288	Steady	32,856,693	60.95%	▼10.74%

== Region-wise breakup ==
Region	Total seats	Indian National Congress		Shivsena		Nationalist Congress Party		Bharatiya Janata Party	
Western Maharashtra	66	18	▼21	09	Steady	23	▲23	04	▼02
Vidarbha	60	24	▲10	07	▼04	04	▲04	23	▲03
Marathwada	48	15	▲04	16	▲01	06	▲06	11	▲01
Thane+Konkan	30	00	▼03	14	Steady	05	▲05	05	▼01
Mumbai	45	10	▲09	11	▼07	13	▲13	08	▼04
North Maharashtra	39	08	▼04	12	▲06	07	▲07	07	▼04
Total	288	75	▼05	69	▼04	58	▲58	56	▼09

== Alliance-wise results ==
75	69	58	56
INC	SHS	NCP	BJP

Alliance	Political Party	Seats Won	Total Seats
UPA	Indian National Congress	75	146
UPA	Nationalist Congress Party	58	146
UPA	Peasants and Workers Party of India	5	146
UPA	Communist Party of India (Marxist)	2	146
UPA	Independents	6	146
NDA	Shiv Sena	69	131
NDA	Bharatiya Janata Party	56	131
NDA	Independents	6	131

=== Division wise results ===
Division	District	Seats					
Division	District	Seats	INC	SHS	NCP	BJP	OTH
Amravati	Akola + Washim	10	2	1	1	4	2
Amravati	Amravati	8	3	2	0	3	0
Amravati	Buldhana	7	3	1	1	2	0
Amravati	Yavatmal	8	6	0	1	0	1
Total Seats		33	14	4	3	9	3
Aurangabad	Aurangabad	7	2	3	0	2	0
Aurangabad	Beed	6	0	0	3	2	1
Aurangabad	Jalna	5	1	1	1	2	0
Aurangabad	Osmanabad	6	3	2	1	0	0
Aurangabad	Nanded	8	1	4	0	1	2
Aurangabad	Latur	6	1	1	0	3	1
Aurangabad	Parbhani + Hingoli	8	2	5	0	0	1
Total Seats		46	10	16	5	10	5
Konkan	Mumbai City	16	4	7	0	4	1
Konkan	Mumbai Suburban	17	8	4	0	4	1
Konkan	Thane + Palghar	13	1	5	2	2	3
Konkan	Raigad	7	0	2	2	0	3
Konkan	Ratnagiri	7	0	5	0	2	0
Konkan	Sindhudurg	4	0	3	0	1	0
Total Seats		64	13	26	4	13	8
Nagpur	Bhandara + Gondia	9	3	1	0	5	0
Nagpur	Chandrapur	6	3	0	0	3	0
Nagpur	Gadchiroli	3	0	1	0	1	1
Nagpur	Nagpur	11	3	1	2	3	2
Nagpur	Wardha	4	3	1	0	0	0
Total Seats		33	12	4	2	12	3
Nashik	Dhule + Nandurbar	10	5	1	2	0	2
Nashik	Jalgaon	12	1	5	1	5	0
Nashik	Nashik	13	2	4	4	2	1
Total Seats		35	8	10	7	7	3
Pune	Kolhapur	12	5	1	5	0	1
Pune	Pune	18	2	4	7	3	2
Pune	Sangli	9	4	0	4	0	1
Pune	Satara	10	1	0	9	0	0
Pune	Solapur	13	3	2	6	0	2
Pune	Ahmednagar	13	3	2	5	2	1
Total Seats		75	18	9	36	5	7
Grand Total		288	75	69	58	56	30

== Results by constituency ==
Winner, runner-up, voter turnout, and victory margin in every constituency
Assembly Constituency		Turnout	Winner				Runner Up				Margin
#k	Names	%	Candidate	Party	Votes	%	Candidate	Party	Votes	%	Margin
1	Sawantwadi	55.48%	Dalvi Shivram Gopal	SS	31,254	40.47%	Pravin Prataprao Bhonsle	NCP	30,023	38.87%	1,231
2	Vengurla	53.47%	Kambali Shankar Shivram	SS	28,391	43.43%	Pushpasen Sawant	JD(S)	18,073	27.65%	10,318
3	Malvan	57.10%	Narayan Tatu Rane	SS	41,028	61.73%	Nandkumar Shridhar Sawant	INC	13,718	20.64%	27,310
4	Deogad	52.18%	Appa Gogate	BJP	23,268	36.06%	Narayan Kashinath Uparkar	Independent	13,669	21.18%	9,599
5	Rajapur	58.64%	Kadam Ganpat Daulat	SS	32,619	45.08%	Hatankar Laxman Rangnath	INC	22,441	31.02%	10,178
6	Ratnagiri	53.99%	Balasaheb Mane	BJP	44,000	47.76%	Kumar Shetye	NCP	31,687	34.40%	12,313
7	Sangameshwar	63.33%	Ravindra Muralidhar Mane	SS	35,107	43.35%	Bane Subhash Shantaram	Independent	19,310	23.85%	15,797
8	Guhagar	62.03%	Dr. Vinay Shridhar Natu	BJP	38,861	49.41%	Bait Chandrakant Dhondu	NCP	25,126	31.95%	13,735
9	Chiplun	70.32%	Bhaskar Jadhav	SS	45,926	49.89%	Rameshbhai Kadam	NCP	44,150	47.96%	1,776
10	Khed	66.27%	Ramdas Gangaram Kadam	SS	54,639	63.95%	Bhosale Keshavarao Jagatarao	NCP	27,900	32.65%	26,739
11	Dapoli	66.68%	Dalvi Suryakant Shivram	SS	50,738	57.83%	Ashok Arjunrao Alias Bhai Jagtap	INC	28,648	32.65%	22,090
12	Mahad	68.46%	Prabhakar Sundarrao More	SS	46,212	49.23%	Manik Jagtap	NCP	42,965	45.77%	3,247
13	Shrivardhan	64.93%	Sawant Shyam Tukaram	SS	34,695	35.94%	Tawsalkar Santosh Manohar	INC	25,324	26.23%	9,371
14	Mangaon	64.03%	Sunil Tatkare	NCP	41,573	47.85%	Ghosalkar Vinod Ramchandra	SS	34,120	39.27%	7,453
15	Pen	63.65%	Mohan Mahadeo Patil	PWPI	38,768	35.05%	Ravisheth Patil	INC	36,155	32.69%	2,613
16	Alibag	60.14%	Meenakshi Patil	PWPI	53,459	47.73%	Madhu Thakur	INC	35,657	31.84%	17,802
17	Panvel	60.78%	Vivek Shankar Patil	PWPI	62,237	46.23%	R. C. Gharat	INC	46,741	34.72%	15,496
18	Khalapur	57.06%	Suresh Narayan Lad	NCP	36,853	33.32%	Vasant Bhoir	INC	31,891	28.83%	4,962
19	Colaba	35.36%	Patrawala Marazban Jal	INC	23,235	50.41%	Ad. Prakash Sampat Bhaud	SS	11,962	25.95%	11,273
20	Umarkhadi	38.59%	Bashir Moosa Patel	SP	17,980	38.58%	Abdullah Shahadat	INC	16,192	34.74%	1,788
21	Mumbadevi	39.80%	Raj K. Purohit	BJP	24,823	63.05%	Bhanwarsingh Narayansingh Rajpurohit	INC	13,311	33.81%	11,512
22	Khetwadi	43.45%	Atul Shah	BJP	20,404	42.72%	Deshmukh Sahebrao Ramchandra	INC	16,252	34.03%	4,152
23	Opera House	46.15%	Chandrakant Shankar Padwal	SS	22,363	50.74%	Kisan Baburao Jadhav	INC	17,826	40.44%	4,537
24	Malabar Hill	48.27%	Mangal Prabhat Lodha	BJP	41,596	52.63%	Balvantray Ambelal Desai	INC	29,214	36.96%	12,382
25	Chinchpokli	44.32%	Anna Alias Madhu Chavan	INC	21,146	35.33%	Khan Fayyaz Ahmed Rafique Ahmed	JD(S)	17,828	29.78%	3,318
26	Nagpada	41.68%	Sayyed Ahmed Alinki	INC	18,725	36.55%	Abrani Yusuf	SP	16,595	32.39%	2,130
27	Mazgaon	43.99%	Bala Nandgaonkar	SS	27,605	49.00%	Sunita Subhash Shinde	NCP	11,701	20.77%	15,904
28	Parel	46.82%	Dagdu Haribhau Sakpal	SS	35,759	54.53%	Arun Govind Nare	INC	13,823	21.08%	21,936
29	Shivadi	48.16%	Sachin Mohan Ahir	NCP	32,023	43.40%	Datta Rane	BJP	26,685	36.16%	5,338
30	Worli	46.12%	Dattaji Nalawade	SS	26,993	43.95%	Vijay Bhau Kudtarkar	NCP	16,063	26.15%	10,930
31	Naigaon	48.77%	Kolambkar Kalidas Nilkanth	SS	44,733	61.61%	Satish Pednekar	BBM	13,303	18.32%	31,430
32	Dadar	51.78%	Vishakha Raut	SS	34,308	48.49%	Rajan Bhosle	INC	20,529	29.02%	13,779
33	Matunga	43.50%	Chandrakanta Goyal	BJP	37,244	38.35%	Upendra P. Doshi	INC	35,485	36.54%	1,759
34	Mahim	48.28%	Suresh Anant Gambhir	SS	40,883	56.72%	Chaudhari Abdul Wahab Mohammadali	BBM	16,965	23.54%	23,918
35	Dharavi	41.10%	Dr. Jyoti Gaikwad	INC	52,087	46.93%	Baburao Mane	SS	42,673	38.45%	9,414
36	Vandre	46.89%	Baba Ziauddan Siddique	INC	38,380	47.89%	Deepak S. Padwal	BJP	29,476	36.78%	8,904
37	Kherwadi	46.30%	Janardan Chandurkar	INC	37,936	41.94%	Shrikant Krishnaji Sarmalkar	SS	35,577	39.33%	2,359
38	Vile Parle	47.84%	Vinayak Bhaurao Raut	SS	45,499	45.64%	Ashok Bhau Jadhav	INC	43,790	43.92%	1,709
39	Amboli	41.81%	Baldev Khosa	INC	70,183	47.90%	Shantaram Soma Ambre	SS	58,715	40.07%	11,468
40	Santacruz	48.85%	Kripashankar Singh	INC	61,627	50.32%	Abhiram Singh	BJP	52,497	42.86%	9,130
41	Andheri	46.23%	Suresh Shetty	INC	80,588	50.62%	Sitaram Bhikaji Dalvi Aaba	SS	66,431	41.73%	14,157
42	Goregaon	41.42%	Nandkumar Kale	SS	57,019	53.59%	Kashinath Munniram Pasi	RPI	21,976	20.65%	35,043
43	Malad	42.51%	Gajanan Kirtikar	SS	95,224	42.05%	Tarashankar Choube	INC	85,409	37.72%	9,815
44	Kandivali	37.51%	Mehta Pradhuman Umiyashankar	INC	79,560	48.23%	Jaiprakash Thakur	BJP	77,222	46.81%	2,338
45	Borivali	41.73%	Hemendra Mehta	BJP	1,27,784	62.90%	Ashok Ramdas Sutrale	INC	69,851	34.38%	57,933
46	Trombay	46.16%	Ashraf Sayed Sohail	INC	95,783	47.58%	Narkar Ratnakar Pandurang	SS	62,547	31.07%	33,236
47	Chembur	43.82%	Pramod Shirwalkar	BJP	58,118	51.20%	Chandrakant Handore	Independent	17,727	15.62%	40,391
48	Nehrunagar	47.62%	Nawab Malik	SP	48,155	45.93%	Manohar Salvi	SS	29,697	28.32%	18,458
49	Kurla	44.91%	Mohammed Arif Naseem Khan	INC	87,066	45.55%	Shantaram Sitaram Chauhan	SS	64,045	33.51%	23,021
50	Ghatkopar	51.38%	Prakash Mehta	BJP	70,641	61.81%	Chandrika Premji Keniya	INC	25,689	22.48%	44,952
51	Bhandup	47.55%	Liladhar Dake	SS	64,328	42.15%	Sanjay Dina Patil	NCP	55,572	36.41%	8,756
52	Mulund	47.94%	Sardar Tara Singh	BJP	80,972	51.99%	Charan Singh Sapra	INC	48,577	31.19%	32,395
53	Thane	39.77%	Moreshwar Damodar Joshi	SS	67,429	45.68%	Subhash Kanade	INC	56,950	38.58%	10,479
54	Belapur	27.49%	Sitaram Bhoir	SS	81,764	34.21%	Ganesh Naik	NCP	78,978	33.04%	2,786
55	Ulhasnagar	25.36%	Suresh @ Pappu Budharmal Kalani	Native People's Party	63,931	64.08%	Sitaldas Khubchand Harchandani	BJP	29,618	29.69%	34,313
56	Ambernath	33.41%	Sabir Shaikh	SS	64,674	46.67%	Pundlik Balu Mhatre	Independent	50,015	36.09%	14,659
57	Kalyan	37.20%	Jagannath Shivram Patil	BJP	101,540	57.66%	Dr. R. B. Singh	INC	60,219	34.19%	41,321
58	Murbad	62.31%	Gotiram Padu Pawar	NCP	48,786	47.84%	Digambar Narayan Vishe	BJP	31,035	30.43%	17,751
59	Wada	49.93%	Vishnu Rama Savar	BJP	54,696	47.11%	Patil Shantaram Dundaram	NCP	21,848	18.82%	32,848
60	Bhiwandi	36.83%	Abdul Rasheed Tahir Momin	INC	66,257	38.67%	Naik Madan (Buwa) Krushna	SS	43,680	25.49%	22,577
61	Vasai	45.40%	Hitendra Vishnu Thakur	Independent	85,352	56.42%	Deepak Gavankar	SS	34,924	23.08%	50,428
62	Palghar	46.73%	Manisha Manohar Nimkar	SS	46,015	55.54%	Pagi Geeta Gajanan	JD(S)	21,673	26.16%	24,342
63	Dahanu	54.45%	Krushna Ghoda	NCP	40,895	36.18%	Ishwar Kisan Dhodi	SS	29,508	26.11%	11,387
64	Jawhar	59.74%	Varatha Ramjee Mahadu	CPI(M)	47,475	41.14%	Vadu Kanchan Ramji	BJP	31,584	27.37%	15,891
65	Shahapur	56.68%	Daulat Bhika Daroda	SS	29,293	36.22%	Mahadu Nago Barora	NCP	24,923	30.82%	4,370
66	Igatpuri	50.07%	Gangad Pandurang Chapu (Baba)	SS	21,807	29.98%	Damse Vasant Madhavrao	INC	21,179	29.11%	628
67	Nashik	46.58%	Dr. Daulatrao Aher Sonuji	BJP	73,591	47.51%	Dr. Pawar Vasant Nivrutti	NCP	49,717	32.10%	23,874
68	Deolali	47.11%	Babanrao Gholap	Independent	58,657	47.01%	Sadaphule Ramdas Dayaram (Baba)	NCP	54,949	44.04%	3,708
69	Sinnar	75.17%	Manikrao Shivajirao Kokate	SS	66,072	58.42%	Dighole Tukaram Sakharam	NCP	42,715	37.77%	23,357
70	Niphad	65.50%	Kadam Mandakini Raosaheb	SS	43,222	36.78%	Bankar Dilip Shankar	NCP	31,157	26.51%	12,065
71	Yevla	66.11%	Patil Kalyanrao Jayawantrao	SS	39,419	34.68%	Darade Narendra Bhikaji	INC	39,198	34.49%	221
72	Nandgaon	60.59%	Aher Anilkumar Gangadhar	INC	35,953	35.34%	Ashok Yadavrao Rasal	SS	20,419	20.07%	15,534
73	Malegaon	58.48%	Shaikh Rashid Haji Shaikh Shaffi	INC	74,433	53.82%	Nihal Ahmed Maulavi Mohammed Usman	JD(S)	48,254	34.89%	26,179
74	Dabhadi	64.08%	Hiray Prashant Vyankatrao	NCP	41,304	34.95%	Nikam Suresh Ramrao	BJP	35,275	29.85%	6,029
75	Chandwad	70.47%	Shirishkumar Vasantrao Kotwal	NCP	61,333	58.74%	Kasliwal Jaichand Deepchand	BJP	39,469	37.80%	21,864
76	Dindori	59.51%	Charoskar Ramdas Kisanrao	NCP	32,522	32.28%	Gumbade Somnath Sakharam	SS	21,551	21.39%	10,971
77	Surgana	65.86%	Jiva Pandu Gavit	CPI(M)	43,758	39.68%	Chavan Harischandra Deoram	NCP	32,546	29.51%	11,212
78	Kalwan	62.78%	Arjun Tulshiram Pawar	NCP	42,165	42.99%	Gangurde Dhanraj Krishna	BJP	31,629	32.25%	10,536
79	Baglan	47.75%	Ahire Shankar Daulat	BJP	27,902	32.48%	Sonawane Abhiman Fula	INC	19,392	22.57%	8,510
80	Sakri	49.84%	Suryavanshi Vasant Dodha	BBM	36,481	40.49%	Anil Sukram Bagul	BJP	29,195	32.41%	7,286
81	Navapur	68.30%	Surupsingh Hirya Naik	INC	66,902	52.81%	Dilip Shashikumar Naik	NCP	42,397	33.47%	24,505
82	Nandurbar	68.92%	Dr.Vijaykumar Krishnarao Gavit	NCP	61,707	50.62%	Vasave Indrasing Diwansing	INC	57,013	46.77%	4,694
83	Talode	64.07%	Padmakar Vijaysing Valvi	INC	51,977	52.92%	Padvi Narendrasing Bhagatsing	BJP	32,962	33.56%	19,015
84	Akrani	60.21%	Kagda Chandya Padvi	INC	39,353	44.54%	Paradake Rupsing Parashi	NCP	27,548	31.18%	11,805
85	Shahada	63.81%	Dr. Deshmukh Hemant Bhaskar	NCP	46,323	42.57%	Annasaheb P. K. Patil	INC	42,303	38.88%	4,020
86	Shirpur	68.41%	Amrishbhai Rasiklal Patel	INC	71,053	56.81%	Patil Shivajirao Girdhar	NCP	41,182	32.93%	29,871
87	Sindkheda	63.22%	Patil Ramkrushna Dodha	SS	37,856	39.77%	Rawal Jitendrasinhg Jaysinhg Alias Sarkarsaheb	NCP	31,643	33.24%	6,213
88	Kusumba	61.53%	Rohidas Chudaman Patil	INC	48,147	48.05%	Gajanan Narayan Patil	NCP	47,702	47.61%	445
89	Dhule	51.78%	Anil Anna Gote	Samajwadi Janata Party (Maharashtra)	40,986	34.64%	Bapu Shardul	SS	37,310	31.53%	3,676
90	Chalisgaon	55.26%	Ghode Sahebrao Sitaram	BJP	46,660	46.21%	Chavan Vishwas Dagdu	NCP	42,619	42.21%	4,041
91	Parola	64.74%	Patil Chimanrao Rupchand	SS	47,041	39.51%	Dr. Satish Bhaskarrao Patil	NCP	42,013	35.29%	5,028
92	Amalner	61.55%	Dr. Abasaheb B S Patil	BJP	49,523	50.03%	Shinde Anil Nathu	INC	22,523	22.75%	27,000
93	Chopda	67.70%	Arunlal Gowardhandas Gujrathi	NCP	38,135	38.82%	Patil Kailas Gorakh	SS	36,025	36.67%	2,110
94	Erandol	64.82%	Gulab Raghunath Patil	SS	44,711	42.73%	Patil Mahendrasinh Dharamsinh	JD(S)	40,621	38.82%	4,090
95	Jalgaon	61.97%	Sureshkumar Bhikamchand Jain	SS	63,964	46.70%	Dr. Arjun Ganpat Bhangale	INC	41,280	30.14%	22,684
96	Pachora	63.52%	Tatyasaheb R.O. Patil	SS	46,335	42.98%	Onkar Narayan Wagh	Maharashtra Vikas Congres	29,491	27.36%	16,844
97	Jamner	75.34%	Girish Dattatraya Mahajan	BJP	56,416	47.12%	Ishwarlal Shankarlal Jain	NCP	41,479	34.64%	14,937
98	Bhusawal	59.40%	Bhole Dilip Atmaram	SS	44,514	36.76%	Chaudhari Satoshbhau Chabildas	Independent	33,553	27.71%	10,961
99	Yawal	68.17%	Haribhau Madhao Jawale	BJP	38,227	40.10%	Chaudhary Ramesh Vitthal	INC	37,815	39.67%	412
100	Raver	72.12%	Mahajan Rajaram Ganu	INC	47,719	43.38%	Arun Pandurang Patil	BJP	41,251	37.50%	6,468
101	Edlabad	72.68%	Eknath Khadse	BJP	59,223	49.05%	Ravindra Pralhadrao Patil	NCP	34,167	28.30%	25,056
102	Malkapur	74.14%	Chainsukh Madanlal Sancheti	BJP	47,192	42.09%	Jamadar Rashidkhan Yusufkhan	INC	30,346	27.06%	16,846
103	Buldhana	71.86%	Sawale Drupatrao Bhagwanrao	INC	42,079	32.98%	Shinde Vijay Haribhau	SS	34,789	27.27%	7,290
104	Washim	64.34%	Prof. Shikhre Yadavrao Punjaji	BJP	45,181	44.09%	Jumde Madhukar Kachruji	BBM	28,911	28.21%	16,270
105	Mangrulpir	64.31%	Subhash Pandharinath Thakre	NCP	34,377	33.10%	Dr. Mahadev Parashram Rathod	BBM	30,800	29.65%	3,577
106	Mehkar	75.24%	Prataprao Jadhav	SS	56,138	48.85%	Saoji Subodh Keshav	Independent	21,607	18.80%	34,531
107	Khamgaon	72.90%	Dilip Kumar Gokulchand Sananda	INC	55,651	41.52%	Kokare Nana Nimbaji	NCP	43,320	32.32%	12,331
108	Jalamb	67.09%	Krushnarao Ganpatrao Ingle	INC	42,773	40.51%	Varukar Vasant Narayan	BJP	37,417	35.44%	5,356
109	Akot	62.80%	Bodkhe Ramdas Maniram	BBM	35,400	35.07%	Karale Rameshwar Wasudeo	SS	25,909	25.67%	9,491
110	Borgaon Manju	58.07%	Dr. Bhande Dashrath Motiram	BBM	51,329	40.32%	Malokar Vijay Onkarrao	SS	39,939	31.37%	11,390
111	Murtizapur	55.13%	Sanjay Dhotre	BJP	42,173	47.25%	Rathod Hirasing Ramu	BBM	37,473	41.98%	4,700
112	Balapur	61.92%	Tayade Laxmanrao Babuji	INC	40,228	39.49%	Gavhankar Narayanrao Haribhau	BJP	29,376	28.84%	10,852
113	Medshi	61.28%	Vijay Tulshiramji Jadhao	BJP	45,389	44.70%	Zanak (Patil) Subhash Ramraoji	INC	39,126	38.53%	6,263
116	Karanja	61.78%	Babasaheb Dhabekar	INC	37,980	41.53%	Prakash Uttamrao Dahake	NCP	35,099	38.38%	2,881
118	Daryapur	67.69%	Prakash Gunvantrao Bharsakale	SS	39,517	38.66%	Madanrao Patil Gawande	INC	26,863	26.28%	12,654
119	Melghat	62.60%	Rajkumar Dayaram Patel	BJP	43,698	41.06%	Patel Ramu Mhatang	INC	40,363	37.92%	3,335
120	Achalpur	68.77%	Vasudhatai Pundlikrao Deshmukh	INC	35,006	30.13%	Bachchu Kadu	Independent	32,775	28.21%	2,231
121	Morshi	62.45%	Nareshchandra Panjabrao Thakre	INC	37,362	35.79%	Sanjay Atmaram Yawalkar	SS	34,659	33.21%	2,703
122	Teosa	65.19%	Sahebrao Ramchandra Tatte	BJP	35,282	38.23%	Chandrakant Alias Bhaiyasaheb Ramchandra Thakur	INC	34,157	37.01%	1,125
123	Walgaon	59.79%	Band Sanjay Raosaheb	SS	40,690	47.04%	D. Z. Wakpanjar	RPI	21,491	24.84%	19,199
124	Amravati	57.52%	Dr. Sunil Panjabrao Deshmukh	INC	57,270	43.73%	Gupta Jagdish Motilal	BJP	47,400	36.19%	9,870
125	Badnera	58.36%	Dnyaneshwar Dhane Patil	SS	46,079	40.48%	Baba Alias Pratapsingh Dhanpat Rathod	INC	34,523	30.33%	11,556
126	Chandur	66.05%	Pratap Arunbhau Adsad	BJP	32,252	33.92%	Virendra Walmikrao Jagtap	INC	30,479	32.06%	1,773
127	Arvi	64.94%	Dr. Sharadrao Kale	INC	43,897	39.55%	Vijayraoji Mude	BJP	31,254	28.16%	12,643
128	Pulgaon	60.14%	Ranjit Prataprao Kamble	INC	44,977	43.64%	Ramdas Tadas	NCP	24,326	23.60%	20,651
129	Wardha	62.17%	Pramod Bhauraoji Shende	INC	45,188	38.59%	Deshmukh Suresh Bapuraoji	NCP	37,151	31.73%	8,037
130	Hinganghat	61.91%	Ashok Shamrao Shinde	SS	54,108	43.19%	Timande Raju Alias Mohan Wasudeorao	Independent	41,690	33.28%	12,418
131	Umred	68.90%	Vasantrao Balaji Itkelwar	Independent	37,950	34.94%	Raut Vitthalrao Jagobaji (Patil)	BJP	28,899	26.61%	9,051
132	Kamthi	62.64%	Sulekha Narayan Kumbhare	RPI	45,350	37.35%	Akare Manohar Bajirao	BJP	40,094	33.02%	5,256
133	Nagpur North	50.64%	Dr. Nitin Kashinath Raut	INC	67,110	52.41%	Suryavanshi (K. P. ) Krushnakumar Premlal	BJP	43,658	34.10%	23,452
134	Nagpur East	54.03%	Satish Jhaulal Chaturvedi	INC	73,604	42.57%	Barade Pravin Shriniwas	SS	62,990	36.43%	10,614
135	Nagpur South	54.48%	Mohan Gopalrao Mate	BJP	39,374	35.25%	Wanjari Govindarao Marotrao	INC	36,679	32.84%	2,695
136	Nagpur Central	53.28%	Anees Ahmed	INC	39,445	49.10%	Vikas Kumbhare	BJP	31,189	38.82%	8,256
137	Nagpur West	49.81%	Devendra Fadnavis	BJP	94,853	48.66%	Ashok Dhawad	INC	85,766	44.00%	9,087
138	Kalmeshwar	62.29%	Bang Rameshchandra Gopikisan	NCP	34,580	29.97%	Gawande Nana Pandurangji	Independent	31,117	26.97%	3,463
139	Katol	70.39%	Anil Vasantrao Deshmukh	NCP	42,509	43.29%	Virendra Kashirao Deshmukh	PWPI	30,227	30.78%	12,282
140	Savner	69.26%	Devrao Vitthalrao Asole	BJP	42,180	36.62%	Sunil Chhatrapal Kedar	NCP	38,005	32.99%	4,175
141	Ramtek	62.09%	Ashish Nandkishor Jaiswal	SS	42,350	38.70%	Deshmukh Anandrao Ramji	INC	35,035	32.02%	7,315
142	Tumsar	67.38%	Madhukar Yashwantrao Kukde	BJP	31,910	32.88%	Titarmare Narayan Tulshiram	INC	25,719	26.50%	6,191
143	Bhandara	72.56%	Aswale Ram Gopal	BJP	39,968	37.09%	Anandrao Tukaramji Wanjari	INC	28,079	26.06%	11,889
144	Adyar	75.51%	Sawarbandhe Bhuishchandra Alies Bandubhau Harishchandra	INC	54,870	49.64%	Sheshrao Pisaram Girhepunje	SS	17,182	15.55%	37,688
145	Tirora	67.88%	Vaidya Bhajandas Vithoba	BJP	34,315	36.88%	Meshram Nagorao Shrawan	RPI	21,158	22.74%	13,157
146	Gondiya	65.25%	Kuthe Rameshkumar Sampatrao	SS	40,287	39.77%	Jain Ajitkumar Amolakchand	INC	27,906	27.55%	12,381
147	Goregaon	75.67%	Rahangadale Khomeshwar Natthulal	BJP	39,308	39.66%	Baghele Dr. Zamsinghbhau Fagalalbhau	INC	37,326	37.66%	1,982
148	Amgaon	75.06%	Mahadeo Shivankar	BJP	65,705	48.99%	Ramratanbapu Bharatbhapu Raut	INC	63,140	47.08%	2,565
149	Sakoli	78.14%	Sewakbhau Nirdhanji Waghaye	INC	48,654	43.19%	Girhepunje Shiwram Sonabaji	BJP	41,281	36.64%	7,373
150	Lakhandur	80.48%	Patole Nanabhau Falgunrao	INC	63,273	47.56%	Kapgate Dayaram Maroti	BJP	47,007	35.33%	16,266
151	Armori	74.88%	Madavi Ramkrushna Hariji	SS	36,410	30.30%	Anandrao Gangaram Gedam	INC	36,004	29.97%	406
152	Gadchiroli	70.23%	Ashok Nete	BJP	47,391	40.31%	Kowase Marotrao Sainuji	INC	39,293	33.43%	8,098
153	Sironcha	70.01%	Dharamraobaba Bhagwantrao Atram	GGP	27,982	25.14%	Talandi Saguna Penta	INC	27,607	24.80%	375
154	Rajura	71.75%	Sudarashan Bhagwanrao Nimkar	INC	50,654	37.39%	Wamanrao Sadashivrao Chatap	SBP	43,171	31.86%	7,483
155	Chandrapur	59.59%	Sudhir Sachchidanand Mungantiwar	BJP	84,688	51.51%	Bangade Vinayak Baburao	INC	54,109	32.91%	30,579
156	Saoli	70.72%	Shobha Fadnavis	BJP	62,773	46.34%	Khobragade Mrunalini Girish	RPI	31,718	23.41%	31,055
157	Bramhapuri	76.75%	Uddhaorao Antaram Shingade	BJP	46,218	34.84%	Kamble Marotrao Rakhaduji	RPI	27,606	20.81%	18,612
158	Chimur	76.55%	Dr. Avinash Manoharrao Warjukar	INC	50,254	39.14%	Dr. Gajbe Rameshkumar Baburaoji	Independent	49,568	38.61%	686
159	Bhadrawati	64.78%	Sanjay Wamanrao Deotale	INC	49,191	38.54%	Dr. Anil Laxmanrao Bujone	SS	41,918	32.84%	7,273
160	Wani	67.18%	Wamanrao Kasawar	INC	38,725	39.28%	Sanjay Derkar	NCP	27,202	27.59%	11,523
161	Ralegaon	64.26%	Prof. Vasantrao Chindhuji Purke	INC	53,852	53.26%	Atram Ramaji Gangaram	SS	31,347	31.00%	22,505
162	Kelapur	70.14%	Shivajirao Moghe	INC	44,549	44.90%	Kotnake Manohar Deorao	BJP	21,239	21.41%	23,310
163	Yavatmal	58.67%	Kirti Gandhi	INC	51,343	45.90%	Madan Madhukar Yerawar	BJP	41,011	36.66%	10,332
164	Darwha	62.07%	Manikrao Govindrao Thakare	INC	43,474	46.84%	Marotrao Vitthalrao Alias Babu Patil Jait	Independent	23,821	25.67%	19,653
165	Digras	65.74%	Sanjay Uttamrao Deshmukh	Independent	26,415	25.13%	Khwaja Baig	NCP	26,289	25.01%	126
166	Pusad	74.76%	Sudhakarrao Rajusing Naik	NCP	60,177	47.09%	Mukhare Rajan Shivajirao	SS	44,507	34.83%	15,670
167	Umarkhed	73.52%	Ad. Anantrao Apparao Dewasarkar	INC	40,668	35.28%	Prakash Patil Dewasarkar	NCP	37,190	32.26%	3,478
168	Kinwat	74.53%	Digambar Bapuji Pawar Patil	BJP	25,731	24.78%	Jadhav Pardip Hemsing Naik	NCP	21,522	20.73%	4,209
169	Hadgaon	68.86%	Subhash Bapurao Wankhede	SS	36,496	35.09%	Ashtikar Bapurao Shivram Patil	INC	33,874	32.57%	2,622
170	Nanded	62.08%	Khedkar Prakash Murlidharrao	SS	60,474	35.36%	Abdul Samad A. Karim	Independent	41,980	24.55%	18,494
171	Mudkhed	67.79%	Ashokrao Shankarrao Chavan	INC	67,727	59.02%	Manikrao Rajegore	SBP	27,193	23.70%	40,534
172	Bhokar	71.07%	Deshmukh Balajirao Gopalrao	Independent	35,411	34.07%	Ghisewad Naganath Lakshman	BBM	32,773	31.53%	2,638
173	Biloli	57.12%	Thakkarwad Gangaram Poshetti	JD(S)	36,443	28.56%	Kunturkar Gangadharrao Mohanrao Deshmukh	INC	34,956	27.39%	1,487
174	Mukhed	60.93%	Subhash Piraji Sabne	SS	38,752	38.27%	Avinash Madhukarrao Ghate	INC	37,463	36.99%	1,289
175	Kandhar	66.48%	Chavan Rohidas Khobraji	SS	39,662	30.89%	Eshwarrao Narayanrao Bhosikar	INC	31,865	24.81%	7,797
176	Gangakhed	67.01%	Ghandant Sitaram Chimaji	Independent	34,332	36.25%	Dnyanoba Hari Gaikwad	PWPI	27,536	29.08%	6,796
177	Singnapur	64.46%	Jadhav Manikrao Sopanrao	SS	41,656	39.22%	Phale Babasaheb Sheshrao	INC	31,101	29.28%	10,555
178	Parbhani	57.76%	Tukaram Renge Patil	SS	58,257	42.14%	Ansari M. Liyakat Ali A. Kadir	INC	50,978	36.87%	7,279
179	Basmath	74.37%	Dr. Jaiprakash Shankarlal Mundada	SS	69,481	51.08%	Salunke Jayprakash Dandegaonkar	NCP	43,331	31.86%	26,150
180	Kalamnuri	66.99%	Ghuge Gajanan Vitthalrao	SS	31,914	30.07%	Rajanitai Shankarrao Satav	NCP	30,717	28.94%	1,197
181	Hingoli	69.48%	Patil Bhaurao Baburao	INC	47,025	41.46%	Kotkar (Patil) Baliram Kaduji	BJP	41,097	36.23%	5,928
182	Jintur	71.15%	Kundlikrao Bhagwanrao Nagre	INC	46,285	40.95%	Ramprasad Kadam Bordikar	NCP	43,004	38.05%	3,281
183	Pathri	71.41%	Haribhau Vitthalrao Lahane	SS	39,242	39.06%	Abdullah "Babajani" Khan Durrani	NCP	32,351	32.20%	6,891
184	Partur	69.76%	Babanrao Dattatray Yadav	BJP	48,572	45.11%	A. Kadir A. Wahed Deshmukh	INC	32,508	30.19%	16,064
185	Ambad	66.26%	Rajesh Ankushrao Tope	NCP	52,017	39.96%	Shivaji Kundalikrao Chothe	SS	40,765	31.32%	11,252
186	Jalna	66.95%	Kailas Gorantyal	INC	65,001	48.07%	Arjun Khotkar	SS	61,117	45.20%	3,884
187	Badnapur	72.02%	Chavan Narayanrao Satwaji	SS	39,531	34.79%	Chavan Arvind Bajirao	Independent	24,153	21.25%	15,378
188	Bhokardan	72.76%	Vitthalrao Ramsingh Patil Sapkal	BJP	52,456	41.70%	Dalvi Laxmanrao Khanduji	NCP	30,149	23.96%	22,307
189	Sillod	73.14%	Kale Kisanrao Laxmanrao	BJP	43,079	38.35%	Abdul Sattar Abdul Nabi	Independent	27,760	24.71%	15,319
190	Kannad	68.47%	Nitin Suresh Patil	INC	41,096	33.52%	Namdev Ramrao Pawar	SS	39,651	32.34%	1,445
191	Vaijapur	73.70%	Rangnath Murlidhar Wani	SS	51,234	48.60%	Kailas Ramrao Patil	NCP	28,059	26.62%	23,175
192	Gangapur	66.93%	Annasaheb Malku Mane	SS	42,211	33.76%	Krishna Sahebrao Patil	INC	39,849	31.87%	2,362
193	Aurangabad West	60.47%	Rajendra Darda	INC	1,32,568	52.64%	Barwal Gajanan Ramkisan	SS	87,732	34.83%	44,836
194	Aurangabad East	66.61%	Haribhau Bagade	BJP	65,596	48.39%	Autade Keshavrao Vishwanath	INC	48,823	36.02%	16,773
195	Paithan	68.98%	Sandipanrao Asaram Bhumare	SS	48,266	48.71%	Appasaheb Ramkrishna Patil	INC	26,349	26.59%	21,917
196	Georai	79.38%	Badamrao Pandit	Independent	68,937	55.38%	Pandit Amarsinh Shivajirao	NCP	50,272	40.39%	18,665
197	Majalgaon	76.06%	Prakashdada Solanke	BJP	67,303	48.00%	Jagtap Bajirao Sonaji	NCP	39,436	28.12%	27,867
198	Beed	66.49%	Syed Salim Ali Syed Ali	NCP	44,978	33.92%	Prof. Dhande Sunil Suryabhan	SS	41,802	31.52%	3,176
199	Ashti	75.17%	Suresh Dhas	BJP	64,558	45.84%	Dhonde Bhimrao Anandrao	INC	39,626	28.14%	24,932
200	Chausala	69.79%	Kshirsagar Jaidattaji Sonajirao	NCP	44,776	33.18%	Andhale Keshavrao Yadavrao	BJP	42,632	31.60%	2,144
201	Kaij	70.02%	Dr. Vimal Mundada	NCP	81,354	64.82%	Devendra Purshottam Shetty	BJP	35,519	28.30%	45,835
202	Renapur	72.52%	Gopinath Pandurang Munde	BJP	70,187	50.30%	Munde Trimbak Patloba	NCP	39,254	28.13%	30,933
203	Ahmedpur	73.14%	Vinayakrao Kishanrao Jadhav Patil	Independent	40,576	37.93%	Nagargoje Bhagwanrao Kerbaji	BJP	34,361	32.12%	6,215
204	Udgir	74.44%	Kendre Govind Dnyanoba	BJP	50,394	42.12%	Jadhav Balasaheb Kishanrao	NCP	37,604	31.43%	12,790
205	Her	67.52%	Navandiokar Ramchandra Piraji	BJP	42,908	43.47%	Kamble Trimbak Mukundrao	INC	25,500	25.83%	17,408
206	Latur	70.44%	Vilasrao Dagadojirao Deshmukh	INC	1,18,496	63.23%	Gojamgunde Vikram Ganpatrao	BJP	36,963	19.72%	81,533
207	Kalamb	62.21%	Kalpana Ramesh Narhire	SS	37,826	36.61%	Ghodke Kundlik Eknath	PWPI	19,132	18.52%	18,694
208	Paranda	74.03%	Dnyaneshwar Raosaheb Patil	SS	26,818	23.60%	Tatyasaheb Tulsiram Gore	NCP	18,633	16.40%	8,185
209	Osmanabad	68.80%	Dr. Padamsinh Bajirao Patil	NCP	55,848	46.06%	Vishwasrao Jagdevrao Shinde	INC	38,634	31.86%	17,214
210	Ausa	73.33%	Mane Dinakar Baburao	SS	41,052	37.54%	Patel Md. Mujibodin Ismail	INC	35,243	32.23%	5,809
211	Nilanga	72.82%	Shivajirao Patil Nilangekar	INC	54,705	45.32%	Manikrao Bhimrao Jadhav	JD(S)	32,398	26.84%	22,307
212	Omerga	73.24%	Basavraj Madhavrao Patil	INC	56,245	46.87%	Ravindra Gaikwad	SS	43,232	36.03%	13,013
213	Tuljapur	68.77%	Madhukarao Deorao Chavan	INC	30,151	31.72%	Borgaonkar Narendra Baburao	NCP	26,364	27.74%	3,787
214	Akkalkot	69.84%	Siddharam Satlingappa Mhetre	INC	40,917	43.65%	Patil Suresh Shamrao	BJP	35,118	37.46%	5,799
215	Solapur South	65.45%	Anandrao Narayan Devkate	INC	39,951	41.50%	Kore Gopalrao Apparao	NCP	33,123	34.40%	6,828
216	Solapur City South	59.93%	Birajdar Patil Shivsharan Hanmantappa	SS	28,350	29.04%	Adam Narsayya Narayan	CPI(M)	23,647	24.23%	4,703
217	Solapur City North	60.92%	Chakote Vishwanath Baburao	INC	29,167	44.11%	Kishor A. Deshpande	BJP	26,240	39.69%	2,927
218	North Sholapur	55.50%	Khandare Uttamprakash Baburao	SS	63,274	42.66%	Bansode Pandharinath Raju	BBM	35,898	24.20%	27,376
219	Mangalwedha	60.03%	Dhobale Laxman Kondiba	NCP	43,704	41.84%	Shinde Avinash Anant	INC	38,875	37.22%	4,829
220	Mohol	75.24%	Rajan Baburao Patil	NCP	57,135	54.73%	Nimbalkar Chandrakant Dattaji	SS	39,300	37.64%	17,835
221	Barshi	72.69%	Dilip Gangadhar Sopal	NCP	47,527	45.05%	Rajendra Raut	SS	47,188	44.73%	339
222	Madha	67.73%	Babanrao Vitthalrao Shinde	NCP	59,997	54.37%	Dikole Dhananjay Mahadeo	SS	24,408	22.12%	35,589
223	Pandharpur	79.56%	Sudhakar Ramchandra Paricharak	NCP	83,559	52.96%	Kale Vasantrao Shrimant	Independent	68,196	43.22%	15,363
224	Sangola	80.89%	Ganpatrao Abasaheb Deshmukh	PWPI	93,819	60.46%	Shahajibapu Rajaram Patil	Independent	53,485	34.47%	40,334
225	Malshiras	78.45%	Vijaysinh Mohite–Patil	NCP	76,576	54.15%	Adv. Patil Subhash Balasaheb	BJP	56,692	40.09%	19,884
226	Karmala	77.04%	Begal Digambarrao Murlidhar	Independent	43,787	44.05%	Jaywantrao Namdeorao Jagtap	INC	43,106	43.37%	681
227	Karjat	63.40%	Lokhande Sadashiv Kisan	BJP	55,440	56.32%	Kalokhe Shahurao Bhaurao	Independent	17,203	17.48%	38,237
228	Shrigonda	74.35%	Nagwade Shivajirao Narayan	INC	64,738	46.80%	Pachpute Babanrao Bhikaji	NCP	56,663	40.96%	8,075
229	Ahmednagar South	54.81%	Anil Rathod	SS	38,925	36.74%	Kalamkar Dadabhau Dasarth Rao	NCP	22,026	20.79%	16,899
230	Ahmednagar North	70.17%	Shivaji Bhanudas Kardile	Independent	63,576	44.05%	Gadakh Shankarrao Yeshwantrao	NCP	49,562	34.34%	14,014
231	Pathardi	71.07%	Bade Dagadu Paraji	BJP	31,483	27.96%	Rajeev Rajale	INC	30,639	27.21%	844
232	Shegaon	72.15%	Ghule Narendra Marutraoji	NCP	59,168	47.29%	Tukaram Gangadhar Gadakh	BJP	52,747	42.16%	6,421
233	Shrirampur	70.35%	Jayant Murlidhar Sasane	INC	36,053	37.79%	Murkute Bhanudas Kashinath	NCP	35,384	37.09%	669
234	Shirdi	72.28%	Radhakrishna Vikhe Patil	SS	50,799	48.70%	Mhaske Raosaheb Nathaji	NCP	37,399	35.86%	13,400
235	Kopargaon	76.51%	Shankarrao Genuji Kolhe	NCP	40,933	36.83%	Namdeorao Rakhamaji Parjane	SS	36,654	32.98%	4,279
236	Rahuri	69.61%	Prasad Baburao Tanpure	NCP	42,148	39.37%	Chandrashekhar Laxmanrao Kadam	BJP	41,310	38.59%	838
237	Parner	70.30%	Zaware Patil Vasantrao Krushnarao	NCP	30,333	32.41%	Gaikwad Sabajirao Mahadu	SS	21,796	23.29%	8,537
238	Sangamner	74.30%	Vijay Bhausaheb Thorat	INC	61,975	45.32%	Gulve Bapusaheb Namdeo	SS	40,524	29.64%	21,451
239	Nagar–Akola	60.45%	Madhukar Pichad	NCP	45,417	37.52%	Ashok Yashwant Bhangare	INC	43,107	35.61%	2,310
240	Junnar	70.95%	Balasaheb Savalerambuva Dangat	SS	52,284	44.82%	Vallabh Benke	NCP	39,865	34.17%	12,419
241	Ambegaon	72.76%	Dilip Walse Patil	NCP	50,052	52.82%	Adv. Avinash Tukaram Rahane	SS	33,226	35.06%	16,826
242	Khed Alandi	66.59%	Narayanrao Baburao Pawar	NCP	47,925	41.88%	Dilip Dattatray Mohite	SS	44,091	38.53%	3,834
243	Maval	62.01%	Bhegde Digambar Baloba	BJP	46,970	43.09%	Bhegade Krishnarao Dhondiaba	NCP	30,725	28.18%	16,245
244	Mulshi	52.16%	Vithal Alias Kumar Bajirao Gosavi	NCP	60,360	47.80%	Raikar Rajabhau Damodar	SS	37,081	29.37%	23,279
245	Haveli	50.96%	Gajanan Dharmshi Babar	SS	101,389	38.97%	Azambhai Pansare	NCP	89,120	34.25%	12,269
246	Bopodi	50.23%	Adv. Chandrakant Chhajed	INC	39,185	42.07%	Rambhau Genba Moze	NCP	28,919	31.05%	10,266
247	Shivajinagar	54.46%	Vinayak Nimhan	SS	67,979	39.83%	Ankush Kakade	NCP	50,842	29.79%	17,137
248	Parvati	50.27%	Vishwas Gangurde	BJP	66,646	41.21%	Ramesh Anantrao Alias Anadrao Bagve	INC	63,304	39.14%	3,342
249	Kasba Peth	57.94%	Girish Bapat	BJP	39,419	54.65%	Anna Thorat	NCP	19,251	26.69%	20,168
250	Bhavani Peth	50.50%	Deepak Natharam Paigude	SS	29,689	33.74%	Ulhas Balkrinshna Dholepatil	NCP	26,446	30.05%	3,243
251	Pune Cantonment	51.89%	Balasaheb Alias Chandrakant Shivarkar	INC	59,755	41.74%	Kailasrao Kodre	NCP	46,617	32.56%	13,138
252	Shirur	67.26%	Gawade Popatrao Hairba	NCP	41,957	41.34%	Pacharne Baburao Kashinath	INC	33,930	33.43%	8,027
253	Daund	65.66%	Subhash Baburao Kul	NCP	82,655	58.52%	Vasudeo Shankar Kale	BJP	38,536	27.28%	44,119
254	Indapur	76.16%	Harshvardhan Shahajirao Patil	Independent	64,840	49.73%	Nimbalkar Murlidhar Shankarrao	NCP	37,898	29.07%	26,942
255	Baramati	77.08%	Ajit Pawar	NCP	86,507	69.72%	Taware Chandrarao Krishnarao	Independent	36,141	29.13%	50,366
256	Purandar	65.32%	Dada Jadhavrao	JD(S)	44,250	38.63%	Chandukaka Jagtap	INC	28,339	24.74%	15,911
257	Bhor	71.72%	Kashinath Khutwad	NCP	50,063	51.81%	Anantrao Thopate	INC	41,926	43.39%	8,137
258	Phaltan	74.68%	Ramraje Naik Nimbalkar	NCP	63,960	53.51%	Kadam Suryajirao Shankarrao Alais Chimanrao	INC	32,180	26.92%	31,780
259	Man	67.44%	Tupe Tukaram Namdeo	NCP	45,993	41.92%	Waghmare Dhondiram Ganapati	INC	34,876	31.79%	11,117
260	Khatav	70.77%	Gudage Mohanrao Pandurang	NCP	42,813	40.21%	Yelgaonkar Dilip Murlidhar	BJP	41,249	38.74%	1,564
261	Koregaon	73.18%	Dr. Shalini Patil	NCP	61,692	58.85%	Jagtap Shankarrao Chimaji	INC	36,069	34.40%	25,623
262	Wai	75.40%	Madanrao Prataprao Pisal	NCP	43,181	41.80%	Madanrao Prataprao Bhosale	INC	41,326	40.01%	1,855
263	Jaoli	66.41%	Shinde Shashikant Jayawantrao	NCP	54,782	44.94%	Sapkal Sadashiv Pandurang	SS	42,596	34.94%	12,186
264	Satara	68.22%	Abhaysinh Shahumaharaj Bhosale	NCP	59,780	49.12%	Udayanraje Bhosale	BJP	54,417	44.71%	5,363
265	Patan	76.12%	Vikramsinh Ranjitsinh Patankar	NCP	53,336	49.02%	Shambhuraj Shivajirao Desai	SS	50,773	46.67%	2,563
266	Karad North	70.10%	Shamrao Pandurang Patil	NCP	59,427	47.68%	Anandarao Raghoji Patil	INC	42,322	33.96%	17,105
267	Karad South	71.64%	Vilasrao Balkrishna Patil	INC	62,795	53.83%	Vilasrao Govind Patil	NCP	39,161	33.57%	23,634
268	Shirala	80.50%	Shivajirao Yashwantrao Naik	NCP	66,365	51.14%	Satyajit Shivajirao Deshmukh	INC	60,619	46.71%	5,746
269	Walva	73.85%	Jayant Rajaram Patil	NCP	83,112	61.26%	C. B. Patil	BJP	29,162	21.50%	53,950
270	Bhilwadi Wangi	84.03%	Dr. Patangrao Shripatrao Kadam	INC	79,466	55.82%	Deshmukh Prithviraj Sayajirao	NCP	61,637	43.29%	17,829
271	Sangli	60.81%	Dinkar Tukaram Patil	INC	56,573	51.66%	Sambhaji Pawar	JD(S)	33,415	30.51%	23,158
272	Miraj	63.86%	Dhatture Hafijabhai Husen	INC	47,294	40.90%	Patil Bajrang Tukaram	SS	33,657	29.11%	13,637
273	Tasgaon	79.16%	Raosaheb Ramrao Patil	NCP	55,166	48.67%	Sanjay Ramchandra Patil	INC	51,669	45.59%	3,497
274	Khanapur Atpadi	65.55%	Anil Babar	NCP	52,240	49.39%	Patil Ramrao Dattatray	INC	30,324	28.67%	21,916
275	Kavathe Mahankal	71.70%	Ajitrao Shankarrao Ghorpade	Independent	50,075	39.74%	Shivajirao Krishnaji Shendge	NCP	38,797	30.79%	11,278
276	Jat	66.94%	Sanamadikar Umaji Dhannapa	INC	51,118	48.35%	Vhankhande Sitaram Basappa	NCP	26,402	24.97%	24,716
277	Shirol	72.52%	Satgonda Revgonda Patil	INC	65,174	44.81%	Anna Alias Shamrao Patil Yadravkar	NCP	49,540	34.06%	15,634
278	Ichalkaranji	68.33%	Prakashanna Awade	INC	64,365	42.18%	Ashok Ramchandra Jambhale	NCP	41,402	27.13%	22,963
279	Vadgaon	66.53%	Avale Jayawant Gangaram	INC	46,938	35.38%	Shete Bhaskar Mahadeo	NCP	37,166	28.01%	9,772
280	Shahuwadi	75.28%	Sanjaysing Jayasingrao Gaikwad	INC	54,108	46.97%	Babasaheb Yeshwantrao Patil Sarudkar	NCP	48,451	42.06%	5,657
281	Panhala	77.31%	Vinay Vilasrao Kore	NCP	58,322	53.21%	Patil Yeshwant Eknath	INC	40,608	37.05%	17,714
282	Sangrul	77.45%	Sampatbapu Shamrao Pawarpatil	PWPI	68,576	49.43%	P. N. Patil (Sadolikar)	INC	59,971	43.23%	8,605
283	Radhanagari	74.61%	Desai Bajarang Anandrao	INC	59,938	45.97%	Krishnarao Patil	NCP	52,283	40.10%	7,655
284	Kolhapur	57.68%	Suresh Balwant Salokhe	SS	35,305	32.35%	Adv. Adagule Mahadeo Dadoba	INC	28,068	25.72%	7,237
285	Karvir	61.12%	Digvijay Bhauso Khanvilkar	NCP	64,526	48.34%	Bondre Subhash Alias Chandrakant Shripatrao	INC	47,816	35.82%	16,710
286	Kagal	83.65%	Hasan Miyalal Mushrif	NCP	67,610	50.10%	Ghatage Sanjay Anandrao	INC	64,729	47.96%	2,881
287	Gadhinglaj	75.82%	Desai Krishnarao Rakhamajirao	NCP	54,645	48.22%	Hattarki Rajkumar Shankarrao	INC	34,532	30.47%	20,113
288	Chandgad	81.97%	Narsingrao Gurunath Patil	NCP	59,805	48.01%	Bharmu Subrao Patil	Independent	52,749	42.35%	7,056
