= Dhairyasheel =

Wikimedia disambiguation page

Dhairyasheel may refer to:

- Dhairyasheel Patil Indian politician
- Dhairyasheel Sambhajirao Mane Indian politician
- Dhairyashil Patil Indian politician
