= Ministry of Protocol (Maharashtra) =

Maharashtra government ministry responsible for Protocol

Ministry of Protocol Government of Maharashtra
- मंत्रालय राजशिष्टाचार विभाग, महाराष्ट्र शासन
- Seal of the state of Maharashtra

- Building of Administrative Headquarters of Mumbai

Ministry overview
- Jurisdiction: (India) Maharashtra
- Headquarters: Mantralay, Mumbai
- Minister responsible: Jayakumar Jitendrasinh Rawal, Cabinet Minister
- Deputy Minister responsible: Vacant, TBD since 29 June 2022, Minister of State
- Ministry executive: (IAS)
- Parent department: Government of Maharashtra

The Ministry of Protocol is a ministry of the Government of Maharashtra. It is responsible for preparing annual plans for the development of Maharashtra state.

The Ministry is headed by a cabinet level Minister. Jayakumar Jitendrasinh Rawal is Current Minister of Protocol Government of Maharashtra. In October 2025, Indian Foreign Service (IFS) officer Rajesh Gawande was appointed as the state's new Secretary for Protocol, FDI, Diaspora Affairs and International Outreach.

== Head office ==
Minister of Protocol मंत्री राजशिष्टाचार विभाग
- Emblem of India

- Flag of India

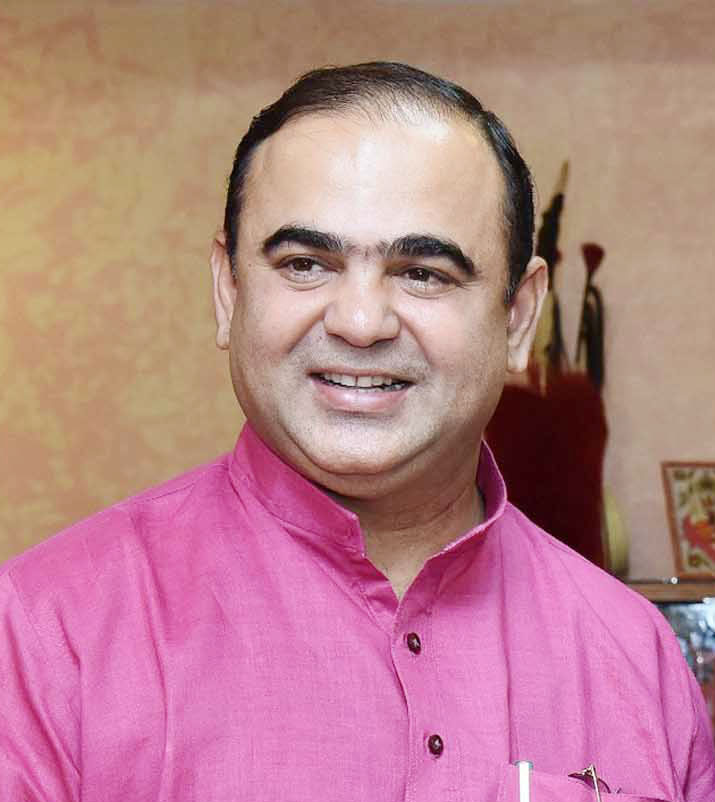
- Incumbent; Jayakumar Jitendrasinh Rawal since 21 December 2024
- Ministry of Protocol (Maharashtra)
- Style: The Honourable
- Abbreviation: Cabinet Minister
- Member of: State Cabinet
- Reports to: Chief Minister, Maharashtra Legislature
- Seat: Mantralaya, Mumbai
- Appointer: Governor on the advice of the Chief Minister
- Term length: 5 years
- Precursor: Devendra Fadnavis; (2024- 2024)
- Inaugural holder: S. K. Wankhede; (1960-1962)
- Formation: 1 May 1960
- Deputy: Vacant, TBD; since 29 June 2022

== Cabinet Ministers ==
No.	Portrait	Minister (Constituency)	Term of office			Political party	Ministry	Chief Minister
No.	Portrait	Minister (Constituency)	From	To	Period	Political party	Ministry	Chief Minister
Minister of Protocol
01		Marotrao Kannamwar (MLA for Saoli Constituency No. 73- Chandrapur District) (Legislative Assembly)	01 May 1960	07 March 1962	1 year, 310 days	Indian National Congress	Yashwantrao I	Yashwantrao Chavan
02		Sheshrao Krishnarao Wankhede (MLA for Sawargoan Constituency No. 49- Nagpur District) (Legislative Assembly)	08 March 1962	19 November 1962	256 days	Indian National Congress	Yashwantrao II	Yashwantrao Chavan
03		Balasaheb Desai (MLA for Patan Constituency No. 261- Satara District) (Legislative Assembly)	20 November 1962	24 November 1963	1 year, 4 days	Indian National Congress	Kannamwar l	Marotrao Kannamwar
04		Parashuram Krishnaji Sawant (MLA for Chiplun Constituency No. 265- Ratnagiri District) (Legislative Assembly) (Interim Chief Minister)	25 November 1962	04 December 1963	9 days	Indian National Congress	Sawant	Parashuram Krishnaji Sawant
05		Vasantrao Naik (MLA for Pusad Constituency No. 81- Yavatmal District) (Legislative Assembly) (Chief Minister)	05 December 1963	01 March 1967	3 years, 86 days	Indian National Congress	Vasantrao I	Vasantrao Naik
06		Gopalrao Bajirao Khedkar (MLA for Akot Constituency No. 28- Akola District) (Legislative Assembly)	01 March 1967	27 October 1969	2 years, 240 days	Indian National Congress	Vasantrao II	Vasantrao Naik
07		D. S. Palaspagar (MLC for Elected by MLAs Constituency No. 19 - Bhandara District) (Legislative Council)	27 October 1969	13 March 1972	2 years, 138 days	Indian National Congress	Vasantrao II	Vasantrao Naik
08		Abdul Rahman Antulay (MLA for Shrivardhan Constituency No. 193- Raigad District) (Legislative Assembly)	13 March 1972	04 April 1973	1 year, 32 days	Indian National Congress	Vasantrao III	Vasantrao Naik
09		Vasantrao Patil (MLC for Elected by MLAs Constituency No. 20 - Sangli District) (Legislative Council)	04 April 1973	17 Match; 1974	347 days	Indian National Congress	Vasantrao III	Vasantrao Naik
10		Shankarrao Chavan (MLA for Bhokar Constituency No. 85- Nanded District) (Legislative Assembly)	17 Match; 1974	21 February 1975	341 days	Indian National Congress	Vasantrao III	Vasantrao Naik
11		Rafiq Zakaria (MLC for Elected by MLAs Constituency No. 16 - Mumbai Suburban District) (Legislative Council)	21 February 1975	16 April 1977	2 years, 54 days	Indian National Congress	Shankarrao I	Shankarrao Chavan
12		Husain Dalwai (MLA for Ratnagiri Khed Constituency No. 266- Ratnagiri District) (Legislative Assembly)	17 April 1977	07 March 1978	1 year, 324 days	Indian National Congress	Vasantdada I	Vasantdada Patil
13		Nashikrao Tirpude (MLA for Bhandara Constituency No. 61- Bhandara District) (Legislative Assembly) (Deputy Chief Minister)	07 March 1978	18 July 1978	133 days	Indian National Congress (Indira)	Vasantdada II	Vasantdada Patil
14		Ganpatrao Deshmukh (MLA for Sangola Constituency No. 235- Solapur District (Legislative Assembly)	18 July 1978	18 February 1980	1 year, 215 days	Peasants and Workers Party of India	Pawar I	Sharad Pawar
15		Nanabhau Yembadwar (MLC for Bhandara - Gondia Local Authorities Constituency No. 14 - Gondia District) (Legislative Council)	09 June 1980	21 January 1982	1 year, 226 days	Indian National Congress	Antulay	Abdul Rahman Antulay
16		Narendra Mahipati Tidke (MLA for Savner Constituency No. 49- Nagpur District) (Legislative Assembly)	21 January 1982	02 February 1983	1 year, 12 days	Indian National Congress	Bhosale	Babasaheb Bhosale
17		Narendra Marutrao Kamble (MLC for Elected by Governor Nominated No. 10 - Mumbai City District) (Legislative Council)	07 February 1983	05 March 1985	2 years, 26 days	Indian National Congress	Vasantdada III	Vasantdada Patil
18		Vasantdada Patil (MLA for Sangli Constituency No. 282- Sangli District) (Legislative Assembly) (Chief Minister)	12 March 1985	03 June 1985	83 days	Indian National Congress	Vasantdada IV	Vasantdada Patil
19		Sudhakarrao Naik (MLA for Pusad Constituency No. 81- Yavatmal District) (Legislative Assembly)	03 June 1985	12 March 1986	282 days	Indian National Congress	Nilangekar	Shivajirao Patil Nilangekar
20		Shankarrao Chavan (MLC for Elected by MLAs Constituency No. 08 - Nanded District) (Legislative Council) (Chief Minister)	12 March 1986	26 June 1988	2 years, 106 days	Indian National Congress	Shankarrao II	Shankarrao Chavan
21		Sushilkumar Shinde (MLA for Solapur City Central Constituency No. 249- Solapur District) (Legislative Assembly)	26 June 1988	03 March 1990	1 year, 250 days	Indian National Congress	Pawar II	Sharad Pawar
22		Sharad Pawar (MLA for Baramati Constituency No. 201- Pune District) (Legislative Assembly) (Chief Minister)	03 March 1990	25 January 1991	328 days	Indian National Congress	Pawar III	Sharad Pawar
23		Jawaharlal Darda (MLC for Elected by MLAs Constituency No. 19 - Yavatmal District) (Legislative Council)	25 January 1991	25 June 1991	151 days	Indian National Congress	Pawar III	Sharad Pawar
24		Sudhakarrao Naik (MLA for Pusad Constituency No. 81- Yavatmal District) (Legislative Assembly) (Chief Minister)	25 June 1991	22 February 1993	1 year, 242 days	Indian National Congress	Sudhakarrao	Sudhakarrao Naik
25		Padamsinh Bajirao Patil (MLA for Osmanabad Constituency No. 242- Osmanabad District (Legislative Assembly)	06 March 1993	18 November 1994	1 year, 257 days	Indian National Congress	Pawar IV	Sharad Pawar
26		Dinkar Patil (MLA for Panvel Constituency No. 188- Raigad District) (Legislative Assembly)	14 March 1995	01 February 1999	3 years, 324 days	Bharatiya Janata Party	Joshi	Manohar Joshi
27		Narayan Rane (MLA for Malvan Constituency No. 269- Sindhudurg District) (Legislative Assembly) (Chief Minister)	01 February 1999	11 May 1999	99 days	Shiv Sena	Rane	Narayan Rane
28		Gopinath Munde (MLA for Renapur Constituency No. 236- Latur District) (Legislative Assembly) (Deputy Chief Minister)	11 May 1999	17 October 1999	159 days	Bharatiya Janata Party	Rane	Narayan Rane
29		Ashok Chavan (MLA for Mudkhed Constituency No. 85- Nanded District) (Legislative Assembly)	19 October 1999	16 January 2003	3 years, 89 days	Indian National Congress	Deshmukh I	Vilasrao Deshmukh
30		Ashok Chavan (MLA for Mudkhed Constituency No. 85- Nanded District) (Legislative Assembly)	18 January 2003	01 November 2004	1 year, 295 days	Indian National Congress	Sushilkumar	Sushilkumar Shinde
31		Vilasrao Deshmukh (MLA for Latur City Constituency No. 235- Latur District) (Legislative Assembly) (Chief Minister)	01 November 2004	09 November 2004	8 days	Indian National Congress	Deshmukh II	Vilasrao Deshmukh
32		Balasaheb Thorat (MLA for Sangamner Constituency No. 217- Ahmednagar District) (Legislative Assembly)	09 November 2004	01 December 2008	4 years, 22 days	Indian National Congress	Deshmukh II	Vilasrao Deshmukh
33		Balasaheb Thorat (MLA for Sangamner Constituency No. 217- Ahmednagar District) (Legislative Assembly)	08 December 2008	06 November 2009	333 days	Indian National Congress	Ashok I	Ashok Chavan
34		Ashok Chavan (MLA for Bhokar Constituency No. 85- Nanded District) (Legislative Assembly) (Chief Minister)	07 November 2009	10 November 2010	1 year, 3 days	Indian National Congress	Ashok II	Ashok Chavan
35		Suresh Shetty (MLA for Andheri East Constituency No. 166- Mumbai Suburban district (Legislative Assembly)	11 November 2010	26 September 2014	3 years, 319 days	Indian National Congress	Prithviraj	Prithviraj Chavan
36		Devendra Fadnavis (MLA for Nagpur South West Constituency No. 52- Nagpur District) (Legislative Assembly) (Chief Minister)	31 October 2014	16 June 2019	4 years, 228 days	Bharatiya Janata Party	Fadnavis I	Devendra Fadnavis
37		Jayakumar Jitendrasinh Rawal (MLA for Sindkheda Constituency No. 06- Dhule District) (Legislative Assembly)	16 June 2019	12 November 2019	149 days	Bharatiya Janata Party	Fadnavis I	Devendra Fadnavis
38		Devendra Fadnavis (MLA for Nagpur South West Constituency No. 52- Nagpur District) (Legislative Assembly) (Chief_Minister); In Charge	23 November 2019	28 November 2019	5 days	Bharatiya Janata Party	Fadnavis II	Devendra Fadnavis
39		Subhash Desai (MLC for Elected by MLAs Constituency No. 09 - Mumbai Suburban District) (Legislative Council)	28 November 2019	30 December 2019	32 days	Shiv Sena	Thackeray	Uddhav Thackeray
40		Aaditya Thackeray (MLA for Worli Constituency No. 182- Mumbai City District (Legislative Assembly)	30 December 2019	29 June 2022	2 years, 181 days	Shiv Sena	Thackeray	Uddhav Thackeray
41		Eknath Shinde (MLA for Kopri-Pachpakhadi Constituency No. 147- Thane District) (Legislative Assembly) (Chief Minister); In Charge	30 June 2022	14 August 2022	45 days	Shiv Sena (2022–present)	Eknath	Eknath Shinde
42		Devendra Fadnavis (MLA for Nagpur South West Constituency No. 52- Nagpur District) (Legislative Assembly) (Deputy Chief Minister)	14 August 2022	26 November 2024	2 years, 135 days	Bharatiya Janata Party	Eknath	Eknath Shinde
43		Devendra Fadnavis (MLA for Nagpur South West Constituency No. 52- Nagpur District) (Legislative Assembly) (Chief_Minister); In Charge	05 December 2024	21 December 2024	16 days	Bharatiya Janata Party	Fadnavis III	Devendra Fadnavis
44		Jayakumar Jitendrasinh Rawal (MLA for Sindkheda Constituency No. 06- Dhule District) (Legislative Assembly)	21 December 2024	Incumbent	1 year, 294 days	Bharatiya Janata Party	Fadnavis III	Devendra Fadnavis

== Ministers of State ==
No.	Portrait	Deputy Minister (Constituency)	Term of office			Political party	Ministry	Minister	Chief Minister
No.	Portrait	Deputy Minister (Constituency)	From	To	Period	Political party	Ministry	Minister	Chief Minister
Deputy Minister of Protocol
Vacant			23 November 2019	28 November 2019	5 days	NA	Fadnavis II	Devendra Fadnavis	Devendra Fadnavis
01		Aditi Tatkare (MLA for Shrivardhan Constituency No. 193- Raigad District) (Legislative Assembly)	30 December 2019	29 June 2022	2 years, 181 days	Nationalist Congress Party	Thackeray	Aaditya Thackeray	Uddhav Thackeray
Vacant			30 June 2022	26 November 2024	2 years, 149 days	NA	Eknath	Eknath Shinde (2022 - 2022); Devendra Fadnavis (2022 –2024)	Eknath Shinde
Vacant			21 December 2024	incumbent	1 year, 294 days	NA	Fadnavis III	Jayakumar Jitendrasinh Rawal (2024 – Present)	Devendra Fadnavis

== List of principal secretaries ==
Additional Chief Secretary (ACS) Manisha Mhaiskar was Chief Protocol Officer till October 2025. Later, an IFS officer who was working as Passport Officer, Rajesh Gawande, was for the first time made as CPO from October 2025.
