= Pen Uran Assembly constituency =

Constituency of the Maharashtra legislative assembly in India

Pen Uran
- Former constituency for the Maharashtra Legislative Assembly

Constituency details
- Country: India
- Region: Western India
- State: Maharashtra
- Established: 1951
- Abolished: 1955
- Total electors: 57,808
- Reservation: None

Pen Uran Assembly constituency was an assembly constituency in the India state of Maharashtra. After 1955 Delimitation Act, its boundaries were revised and the area was added into the Pen Assembly constituency.

== Members of the Legislative Assembly ==
Election	Member	Party
1952	Ambaji Tukaram Patil	Indian National Congress

== Election results ==
=== Assembly Election 1952 ===
1952 Bombay State Legislative Assembly election : Pen Uran
Party	Candidate	Votes	%	±%
INC	Ambaji Tukaram Patil	18,562	57.62%	New
PWPI	Patil Ganpat Laxman	10,424	32.36%	New
Socialist	Patil Damodar Ramchandra	3,231	10.03%	New
Margin of victory		8,138	25.26%	
Turnout		32,217	55.73%	
Total valid votes		32,217		
Registered electors		57,808		
INC win (new seat)				
