= Pen Assembly constituency =

Constituency of the Maharashtra legislative assembly in India

Coordinates: 18.7352917°N 73.0734797°E

Pen
- Constituency No. 191 for the Maharashtra Legislative Assembly

Constituency details
- Country: India
- Region: Western India
- State: Maharashtra
- District: Raigad
- Lok Sabha constituency: Raigad
- Established: 1955
- Total electors: 308,154
- Reservation: None

Member of Legislative Assembly
- 15th Maharashtra Legislative Assembly
- Incumbent Ravisheth Patil
- Party: Bharatiya Janata Party
- Elected year: 2024

Pen Assembly constituency is one of the 288 Vidhan Sabha (legislative assembly) constituencies of Maharashtra state in Western India. It is located in Raigad district. Pen is 30 km from Khopoli, which is 13 km away from Kalote Mokashi. Dhairyshil Patil, the candidate elected in 2014, joined the BJP in March 2023. Ravisheth Patil was elected for a third time in 2024.

== Members of the Legislative Assembly ==
Year	Member	Party
From 1952 - 1957 known as Pen Uran
1952	Ambaji Tukaram Patil	Indian National Congress
1957	Vasant Raut	Peasants and Workers Party of India
1957	Govind Katkari	Peasants and Workers Party of India
1962	Laxman Mhatre	Indian National Congress
1967	A. P. Shetye	Peasants and Workers Party of India
1972	Ambaji Tukaram Patil	Independent politician
1978	Ambaji Tukaram Patil	Indian National Congress
1980	Mohan Patil	Peasants and Workers Party of India
1985	Mohan Patil	Peasants and Workers Party of India
1990	Mohan Patil	Peasants and Workers Party of India
1995	Mohan Patil	Peasants and Workers Party of India
1999	Mohan Patil	Peasants and Workers Party of India
2004	Ravisheth Patil	Indian National Congress
2009	Dhairyashil Patil	Peasants and Workers Party of India
2014	Dhairyashil Patil	Peasants and Workers Party of India
2019	Ravisheth Patil	Bharatiya Janata Party
2024	Ravisheth Patil	Bharatiya Janata Party

== Election results ==
=== Assembly Election 2024 ===
2024 Maharashtra Legislative Assembly election : Pen
Party	Candidate	Votes	%	±%
BJP	Ravisheth Patil	124,631	55.63%	▲2.98
SS(UBT)	Prasad Dada Bhoir	63,821	28.48%	New
PWPI	Atul Nandkumar Mhatre	29,191	13.03%	▼28.35
NOTA	None of the Above	2,473	1.10%	▼0.05
Abhinav Bharat Party	Mangal Parshuram Patil	2,266	1.01%	New
VBA	Devendra Maruti Koli	1,701	0.76%	▲0.10
Margin of victory		60,810	27.14%	▲15.87
Turnout		2,26,527	73.51%	▲2.04
Total valid votes		2,24,054		
Registered electors		3,08,154		▲2.03
BJP hold		Swing	▲2.98	

=== Assembly Election 2019 ===
2019 Maharashtra Legislative Assembly election : Pen
Party	Candidate	Votes	%	±%
BJP	Ravisheth Patil	112,380	52.65%	▲47.91
PWPI	Dhairyashil Mohan Patil	88,329	41.38%	▲9.00
NOTA	None of the Above	2,473	1.16%	▼0.29
INC	Nanda Mhatre	2,330	1.09%	▼29.23
Independent	Ravi Patil	1,561	0.73%	New
Independent	Gharat Ramsheth Manglya	1,556	0.73%	New
VBA	Pawar Ramesh Gauru	1,413	0.66%	New
Margin of victory		24,051	11.27%	▲9.20
Turnout		2,15,933	71.49%	▲0.07
Total valid votes		2,13,453		
Registered electors		3,02,036		▲6.87
BJP gain from PWPI		Swing	▲20.27	

=== Assembly Election 2014 ===
2014 Maharashtra Legislative Assembly election : Pen
Party	Candidate	Votes	%	±%
PWPI	Dhairyashil Mohan Patil	64,616	32.38%	▼1.80
INC	Ravisheth Patil	60,496	30.32%	▲0.42
SS	Kishor Otarmal Jain	44,251	22.18%	New
NCP	Jambhale Sanjay Janardan	11,387	5.71%	New
BJP	Gharat Ramsheth Mangalya	9,452	4.74%	New
MNS	Govardhan Polsani	3,151	1.58%	New
NOTA	None of the Above	2,891	1.45%	New
Independent	Ankush Kisan Tadkar	1,937	0.97%	New
Margin of victory		4,120	2.06%	▼2.22
Turnout		2,02,544	71.67%	▼2.03
Total valid votes		1,99,546		
Registered electors		2,82,621		▲15.51
PWPI hold		Swing	▼1.80	

=== Assembly Election 2009 ===
2009 Maharashtra Legislative Assembly election : Pen
Party	Candidate	Votes	%	±%
PWPI	Dhairyashil Mohan Patil	60,757	34.19%	▲5.68
INC	Ravisheth Patil	53,141	29.90%	▼8.76
Independent	Anil Tatkare	49,992	28.13%	New
Independent	Harishchandra Bhaguram Bekawade	4,642	2.61%	New
Independent	Ravindra Baliram Patil	1,452	0.82%	New
Independent	Patil Vijay Keshav	1,451	0.82%	New
BSP	Raut Bhiku Sitaram	1,437	0.81%	▼0.92
Margin of victory		7,616	4.29%	▼5.87
Turnout		1,77,753	72.65%	▲0.07
Total valid votes		1,77,725		
Registered electors		2,44,673		▲20.77
PWPI gain from INC		Swing	▼4.48	

=== Assembly Election 2004 ===
2004 Maharashtra Legislative Assembly election : Pen
Party	Candidate	Votes	%	±%
INC	Ravisheth Patil	56,841	38.66%	▲5.98
PWPI	Bhai Mohan Mahadev Patil	41,905	28.50%	▼6.55
SS	Vishnu Bhai Patil	28,175	19.16%	▼13.10
Independent	Ravisheth B. Patil	4,932	3.35%	New
Independent	Mohanbhai D. Patil	4,280	2.91%	New
Independent	Ravisheth D. Patil	2,692	1.83%	New
BSP	Pramod Sitaram Kamble	2,543	1.73%	New
Margin of victory		14,936	10.16%	▲7.80
Turnout		1,47,017	72.57%	▲12.83
Total valid votes		1,47,015		
Registered electors		2,02,591		▲9.42
INC gain from PWPI		Swing	▲3.61	

=== Assembly Election 1999 ===
1999 Maharashtra Legislative Assembly election : Pen
Party	Candidate	Votes	%	±%
PWPI	Mohan Mahadeo Patil	38,768	35.05%	▼0.90
INC	Ravisheth Patil	36,155	32.69%	▼2.43
SS	Vishnu Hari Patil	35,683	32.26%	New
Margin of victory		2,613	2.36%	▲1.53
Turnout		1,17,848	63.65%	▼12.33
Total valid votes		1,10,606		
Registered electors		1,85,152		▲11.49
PWPI hold		Swing	▼0.90	

=== Assembly Election 1995 ===
1995 Maharashtra Legislative Assembly election : Pen
Party	Candidate	Votes	%	±%
PWPI	Mohan Mahadeo Patil	43,027	35.95%	▼15.57
INC	Ravindranath Dagadu Patil	42,034	35.12%	▼6.05
BJP	Satish Chandane	15,100	12.62%	▲5.52
Samajwadi Janata Party (Maharashtra)	Vishnu Hari Patil	9,434	7.88%	New
Independent	A. T. Patil	7,371	6.16%	New
Maharashtra Rashtrawadi Congress	Rajanikant Alias Raju Shah	1,009	0.84%	New
Independent	Ballal Govind Puranik	753	0.63%	New
Margin of victory		993	0.83%	▼9.52
Turnout		1,23,755	74.52%	▲7.91
Total valid votes		1,19,685		
Registered electors		1,66,076		▲7.25
PWPI hold		Swing	▼15.57	

=== Assembly Election 1990 ===
1990 Maharashtra Legislative Assembly election : Pen
Party	Candidate	Votes	%	±%
PWPI	Mohan Mahadeo Patil	51,184	51.52%	▼3.97
INC	Mahatre Balaji Damaji	40,904	41.17%	▼0.79
BJP	Dere Diwakar Baburao	7,051	7.10%	New
Margin of victory		10,280	10.35%	▼3.18
Turnout		1,01,782	65.73%	▲4.42
Total valid votes		99,345		
Registered electors		1,54,851		▲27.21
PWPI hold		Swing	▼3.97	

=== Assembly Election 1985 ===
1985 Maharashtra Legislative Assembly election : Pen
Party	Candidate	Votes	%	±%
PWPI	Mohan Mahadeo Patil	40,347	55.49%	▼6.33
INC	Namdeo Yeso Khaire	30,513	41.96%	New
Independent	S. S. Dingale	964	1.33%	New
Margin of victory		9,834	13.52%	▼12.12
Turnout		74,573	61.26%	▲3.53
Total valid votes		72,712		
Registered electors		1,21,728		▲14.31
PWPI hold		Swing	▼6.33	

=== Assembly Election 1980 ===
1980 Maharashtra Legislative Assembly election : Pen
Party	Candidate	Votes	%	±%
PWPI	Mohan Mahadeo Patil	36,996	61.82%	▲22.71
INC(I)	Gavand Vithalrav	21,651	36.18%	New
Independent	Oswal Babulal Sardarmal	773	1.29%	New
Independent	Ravkar Madhusudan Sitaram	425	0.71%	New
Margin of victory		15,345	25.64%	▲21.14
Turnout		61,669	57.91%	▼9.77
Total valid votes		59,845		
Registered electors		1,06,485		▲7.58
PWPI gain from INC		Swing	▲18.21	

=== Assembly Election 1978 ===
1978 Maharashtra Legislative Assembly election : Pen
Party	Candidate	Votes	%	±%
INC	Ambaji Tukaram Patil	28,478	43.61%	▲9.91
PWPI	Mohan Mahadeo Patil	25,541	39.11%	New
JP	Mulchand Surajmal Modi	11,285	17.28%	New
Margin of victory		2,937	4.50%	▼28.10
Turnout		67,479	68.17%	▼6.05
Total valid votes		65,304		
Registered electors		98,986		▲12.83
INC gain from Independent		Swing	▼22.69	

=== Assembly Election 1972 ===
1972 Maharashtra Legislative Assembly election : Pen
Party	Candidate	Votes	%	±%
Independent	Ambaji Tukaram Patil	41,892	66.30%	New
INC	Mohan Mahadeo Patil	21,293	33.70%	▼12.65
Margin of victory		20,599	32.60%	▲31.04
Turnout		65,360	74.50%	▲7.06
Total valid votes		63,185		
Registered electors		87,731		▲14.74
Independent gain from PWPI		Swing	▲18.39	

=== Assembly Election 1967 ===
1967 Maharashtra Legislative Assembly election : Pen
Party	Candidate	Votes	%	±%
PWPI	A. P. Shetye	23,794	47.91%	▲9.39
INC	Ambaji Tukaram Patil	23,021	46.35%	▼3.09
ABJS	B. N. Chavan	1,950	3.93%	▼1.43
Independent	T. S. Damale	903	1.82%	New
Margin of victory		773	1.56%	▼9.37
Turnout		52,732	68.96%	▲10.48
Total valid votes		49,668		
Registered electors		76,463		▲4.69
PWPI gain from INC		Swing	▼1.53	

=== Assembly Election 1962 ===
1962 Maharashtra Legislative Assembly election : Pen
Party	Candidate	Votes	%	±%
INC	Laxman Shankar Mhatre	19,673	49.44%	▲32.53
PWPI	Tukaram Hari Vajekar	15,326	38.52%	▲3.18
ABJS	Diwakar Baburao Dere	2,132	5.36%	New
PSP	Shankar Arjan Mhatre	1,985	4.99%	New
Independent	Trimbak Sadashiv Damale	675	1.70%	New
Margin of victory		4,347	10.92%	▲8.09
Turnout		42,443	58.11%	▼38.71
Total valid votes		39,791		
Registered electors		73,039		▼37.79
INC gain from PWPI		Swing	▲14.10	

=== Assembly Election 1957 ===
1957 Bombay State Legislative Assembly election : Pen
Party	Candidate	Votes	%	±%
PWPI	Raut Vasant Rajaram	38,662	35.34%	New
PWPI	Katkari Govind Sonu (St)	35,559	32.50%	New
INC	Patil Ambaji Tukaram	18,496	16.91%	New
INC	Valekar Babu Hadkya (St)	16,685	15.25%	New
Margin of victory		3,103	2.84%	
Turnout		1,09,402	93.19%	
Total valid votes		1,09,402		
Registered electors		1,17,402		
PWPI gain from INC		Swing		

== See also ==
- Pen
- List of constituencies of the Maharashtra Legislative Assembly
