= Rajesh Padvi =

Indian politician

Member of the Maharashtra Legislative Assembly
- Incumbent
- Assumed office 2019
- Preceded by: Udesingh Kocharu Padvi
- Constituency: Shahada

Personal details
- Born: 5 May 1969 (age 56); Talode, Maharashtra, India
- Political party: Bharatiya Janata Party
- Spouse: Priya
- Education: Bachelor of Arts

Rajesh Udesingh Padvi is an Indian politician. He was elected to the Maharashtra Legislative Assembly from Shahada in the 2019 elections and reelected in the 2024 Maharashtra Assembly elections as a member of Bharatiya Janata Party.
