= Shahada Assembly constituency =

Constituency of the Maharashtra legislative assembly in India

Coordinates: 21.55°N 74.48°E

Shahada
- Constituency No. 2 for the Maharashtra Legislative Assembly

Constituency details
- Country: India
- Region: Western India
- State: Maharashtra
- District: Nandurbar
- Lok Sabha constituency: Nandurbar
- Established: 1957
- Total electors: 352,775
- Reservation: ST

Member of Legislative Assembly
- 15th Maharashtra Legislative Assembly
- Incumbent Rajesh Padvi
- Party: BJP
- Alliance: NDA
- Elected year: 2019

Shahada Assembly constituency (formerly, Shahade) is one of the 288 Vidhan Sabha constituencies of Maharashtra state in western India. This constituency is located in Nandurbar district and is reserved for the candidates belonging to the Scheduled Tribes.

== Overview ==
It is part of Nandurbar Lok Sabha constituency along with another five Vidhan Sabha constituencies, namely Navapur, Nandurbar and Akkalkuwa in Nandurbar district and Sakri and Shirpur in Dhule district.

== Members of the Legislative Assembly ==
Year	Member	Party
1957	Vyankat Tanaji Dhobi	Indian National Congress
1957	Chandrasing Dhanka Bhandari(St)	Indian National Congress
1967	S. B. Pawar	Indian National Congress
1972	Chanurasing Dhanka Bhandari	Indian National Congress
1978	Jaydevsinh Jaysinh Rawal	Indian National Congress
1980	Annasaheb P. K. Patil	Janata Party
1985	Annasaheb P. K. Patil	Janata Party
1990	Dr. Hemant Bhaskar Deshmukh	Indian National Congress
1995	Annasaheb P. K. Patil	Indian National Congress
1999	Dr. Hemant Bhaskar Deshmukh	Nationalist Congress Party
2004	Jayakumar Jitendrasinh Rawal	Bharatiya Janata Party
2009	Padmakar Vijaysingh Valvi	Indian National Congress
2014	Udesingh Kocharu Padvi	Bharatiya Janata Party
2019	Rajesh Udesing Padvi	Bharatiya Janata Party
2024	Rajesh Udesing Padvi	Bharatiya Janata Party

== Election results ==
=== Assembly Election 2024 ===
2024 Maharashtra Legislative Assembly election : Shahada
Party	Candidate	Votes	%	±%
BJP	Rajesh Udesing Padvi	146,839	60.46%	▲14.59
INC	Rajendrakumar Krishnarao Gavit	93,635	38.55%	▼3.46
NOTA	None of the Above	2,425	1.00%	▼0.67
Independent	Gopal Suresh Bhandari	2,396	0.99%	New
Margin of victory		53,204	21.91%	▲18.04
Turnout		245,295	69.53%	▲4.29
Total valid votes		242,870		
Registered electors		352,775		
BJP hold		Swing	▲14.59	

=== Assembly Election 2019 ===
2019 Maharashtra Legislative Assembly election : Shahada
Party	Candidate	Votes	%	±%
BJP	Rajesh Udesing Padvi	94,931	45.87%	▲14.02
INC	Padmakar Vijaysingh Valvi	86,940	42.01%	▲10.55
Independent	Eng.Jelsing Bijala Pawara	21,013	10.15%	New
CPI(M)	Mali Jaysing Devchand	4,060	1.96%	▲0.39
NOTA	None of the Above	3,449	1.67%	▲0.17
Margin of victory		7,991	3.86%	▲3.47
Turnout		210,529		▲0.34
Total valid votes		206,944		
Registered electors		320,555		
BJP hold		Swing	▲14.02	

=== Assembly Election 2014 ===
2014 Maharashtra Legislative Assembly election : Shahada
Party	Candidate	Votes	%	±%
BJP	Udesingh Kocharu Padvi	58,556	31.85%	New
INC	Padmakar Vijaysingh Valvi	57,837	31.46%	▼3.95
NCP	Rajendrakumar Krishnarao Gavit	46,966	25.54%	New
SS	Suresh Sumersing Naik	6,645	3.61%	▼23.09
MNS	Kisan Runjya Pawar	4,410	2.40%	New
CPI(M)	Mali Jaysing Devchand	2,893	1.57%	▼4.15
NOTA	None of the Above	2,755	1.50%	New
Independent	Raman Bhalu Navale	1,540	0.84%	New
Margin of victory		719	0.39%	▼8.31
Turnout		186,619		▲7.99
Total valid votes		183,858		
Registered electors		286,284		
BJP gain from INC		Swing	▼3.56	

=== Assembly Election 2009 ===
2009 Maharashtra Legislative Assembly election : Shahada
Party	Candidate	Votes	%	±%
INC	Padmakar Vijaysingh Valvi	51,222	35.41%	New
SS	Udesingh Kocharu Padvi	38,635	26.71%	New
Independent	Valvi Lalsing Nurya	29,656	20.50%	New
CPI(M)	Shevale Mohansing Pavansing	8,274	5.72%	New
Independent	Pawra Pramila Kelsing	4,032	2.79%	New
Independent	Soni Ratilal Kevaji	3,956	2.73%	New
Independent	Pawra Madan Mitha	1,851	1.28%	New
Margin of victory		12,587	8.70%	▲0.63
Turnout		144,671	56.24%	▼16.71
Total valid votes		144,652		
Registered electors		257,248		▲22.59
INC gain from BJP		Swing	▼0.96	

=== Assembly Election 2004 ===
2004 Maharashtra Legislative Assembly election : Shahada
Party	Candidate	Votes	%	±%
BJP	Jayakumar Jitendrasinh Rawal	55,674	36.37%	▲22.06
NCP	Dr. Deshmukh Hemant Bhaskar	43,314	28.30%	▼14.27
Independent	Annasaheb P.K.Patil	42,809	27.97%	New
Independent	Bhoi Supadu Shankar	4,171	2.72%	New
Independent	Fakir Dilawarsha Kadarsha	2,112	1.38%	New
Independent	Pinjari Salim Kasam	1,366	0.89%	New
BSP	Sanjiv Radheshyam Upadhye	985	0.64%	New
Margin of victory		12,360	8.07%	▲4.38
Turnout		153,089	72.96%	▲13.45
Total valid votes		153,067		
Registered electors		209,838		▲14.74
BJP gain from NCP		Swing	▼6.20	

=== Assembly Election 1999 ===
1999 Maharashtra Legislative Assembly election : Shahada
Party	Candidate	Votes	%	±%
NCP	Dr. Deshmukh Hemant Bhaskar	46,323	42.57%	New
INC	Annasaheb P. K. Patil	42,303	38.88%	▼12.42
BJP	Rajput Sangramsiha Hasarsiha	15,569	14.31%	▲5.76
CPI(M)	Patil Ishwar Madan	2,306	2.12%	▲0.94
Independent	Koli Prakash Vishwas	1,181	1.09%	New
Margin of victory		4,020	3.69%	▼11.94
Turnout		116,691	63.81%	▼14.37
Total valid votes		108,810		
Registered electors		182,883		▲4.53
NCP gain from INC		Swing	▼8.73	

=== Assembly Election 1995 ===
1995 Maharashtra Legislative Assembly election : Shahada
Party	Candidate	Votes	%	±%
INC	Annasaheb P. K. Patil	66,305	51.30%	▲1.11
Independent	Dr. Deshmukh Hemant Bhaskar	46,094	35.66%	New
BJP	Bagal Sayajirao Ganapatrao	11,047	8.55%	▲6.45
CPI(M)	Patil Jivan Ramaji	1,524	1.18%	New
Independent	Patel Prakash Madan	821	0.64%	New
Margin of victory		20,211	15.64%	▲11.11
Turnout		133,197	76.13%	▲2.02
Total valid votes		129,249		
Registered electors		174,964		▲9.55
INC hold		Swing	▲1.11	

=== Assembly Election 1990 ===
1990 Maharashtra Legislative Assembly election : Shahada
Party	Candidate	Votes	%	±%
INC	Dr. Deshmukh Hemant Bhaskar	57,601	50.20%	▲7.26
JD	Annasaheb P. K. Patil	52,406	45.67%	New
BJP	Sisodiya Pundliksing Nathusinh	2,412	2.10%	New
Independent	Patil Ichharam Gongaram	1,689	1.47%	New
Margin of victory		5,195	4.53%	▼7.99
Turnout		117,205	73.39%	▼3.16
Total valid votes		114,754		
Registered electors		159,710		▲27.08
INC gain from JP		Swing	▼5.26	

=== Assembly Election 1985 ===
1985 Maharashtra Legislative Assembly election : Shahada
Party	Candidate	Votes	%	±%
JP	Annasaheb P. K. Patil	52,271	55.45%	▲13.00
INC	Dadasaheb Rawal Jayasinh Daulatsinh	40,474	42.94%	New
Margin of victory		11,797	12.51%	▲4.44
Turnout		96,259	76.59%	▲7.77
Total valid votes		94,265		
Registered electors		125,673		▲11.76
JP hold		Swing	▲13.00	

=== Assembly Election 1980 ===
1980 Maharashtra Legislative Assembly election : Shahada
Party	Candidate	Votes	%	±%
JP	Annasaheb P. K. Patil	32,102	42.46%	▲1.72
INC(I)	Chaudhari Pralhad Alias Mohanbhai Bhaidas	25,998	34.38%	▲30.25
INC(U)	Deshmukh Hemant Bhaskar	16,922	22.38%	New
RPI	Ramraje Nirgun Vajir	591	0.78%	New
Margin of victory		6,104	8.07%	▲5.01
Turnout		77,635	69.04%	▼7.03
Total valid votes		75,613		
Registered electors		112,451		▲9.01
JP gain from INC		Swing	▼1.34	

=== Assembly Election 1978 ===
1978 Maharashtra Legislative Assembly election : Shahada
Party	Candidate	Votes	%	±%
INC	Rawal Jaydevsinh Jaysinh	33,554	43.80%	▼19.26
JP	Patil Purushottam Kalu	31,208	40.73%	New
PWPI	Borse Gulabrao Rajaram	7,206	9.41%	New
INC(I)	Patil Sakharam Sadashiv	3,166	4.13%	New
Independent	Ishi Motiram Narayan	904	1.18%	New
Margin of victory		2,346	3.06%	▼26.74
Turnout		78,816	76.40%	▲44.45
Total valid votes		76,614		
Registered electors		103,158		▲27.86
INC hold		Swing	▼19.26	

=== Assembly Election 1972 ===
1972 Maharashtra Legislative Assembly election : Shahada
Party	Candidate	Votes	%	±%
INC	Chanurasing D. Bhandari	15,171	63.05%	▲10.11
ABJS	Guman Hari Patale	8,001	33.25%	▼11.04
RPI	Bundibai Sardar Chavan	888	3.69%	New
Margin of victory		7,170	29.80%	▲21.15
Turnout		26,150	32.41%	▼22.00
Total valid votes		24,060		
Registered electors		80,678		▲13.32
INC hold		Swing	▲10.11	

=== Assembly Election 1967 ===
1967 Maharashtra Legislative Assembly election : Shahada
Party	Candidate	Votes	%	±%
INC	S. B. Pawar	19,533	52.94%	▲26.9
ABJS	J. P. Pawara	16,343	44.29%	New
Independent	G. P. Nakasare	1,020	2.76%	New
Margin of victory		3,190	8.65%	▲4.49
Turnout		39,566	55.57%	▼34.23
Total valid votes		36,896		
Registered electors		71,194		▼38.44
INC hold		Swing	▲26.90	

=== Assembly Election 1957 ===
1957 Bombay State Legislative Assembly election : Shahada
Party	Candidate	Votes	%	±%
INC	Dhobi Vyankat Tanaji	25,920	26.05%	▼5.19
INC	Bhandari Chandrasing Dhanka (St)	21,782	21.89%	▼9.34
PSP	Pawara Parshi Tetya (St)	18,971	19.06%	New
PSP	Chaudhari Prahlad Bhaidas	18,947	19.04%	New
Independent	Mahar Dullabh Bhaga	5,488	5.51%	New
Independent	Bhil Dagdu Nagu (St)	5,004	5.03%	New
Independent	Bhil Tarsing Singa (St)	3,406	3.42%	New
Margin of victory		4,138	4.16%	▲0.81
Turnout		99,518	86.05%	▼6.69
Total valid votes		99,518		
Registered electors		115,646		▲0.82
INC hold		Swing	▼5.19	

== See also ==
- Shahada
- List of constituencies of Maharashtra Vidhan Sabha
