= Jayakumar Jitendrasinh Rawal =

Indian politician

Jaykumar Rawal
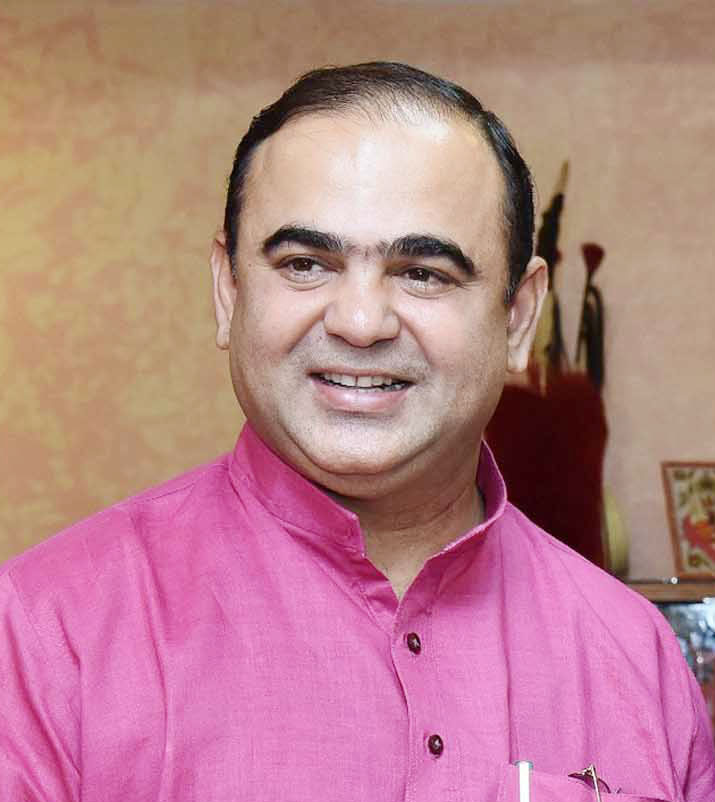

Cabinet Minister Government of Maharashtra
- Incumbent
- Assumed office 15 December 2024
- Minister: Marketing; Protocol
- Governor: C. P. Radhakrishnan; Acharya Devvrat additional charge
- Cabinet: Third Fadnavis ministry
- Chief Minister: Devendra Fadnavis
- Deputy CM: Eknath Shinde; Ajit Pawar (till his demise in 2026) Sunetra Pawar (from 2026)
- Guardian Minister: Dhule

Minister of Food & Drug Administration Government of Maharashtra
- In office 16 June 2019 – 12 November 2019
- Chief Minister: Devendra Fadnavis
- Preceded by: Girish Bapat

Minister of Tourism Government of Maharashtra
- In office 8 July 2016 – 12 November 2019
- Chief Minister: Devendra Fadnavis
- Succeeded by: Aaditya Thackeray

Minister of Employment Guarantee Government of Maharashtra
- In office 8 July 2016 – 16 June 2019
- Chief Minister: Devendra Fadnavis
- Succeeded by: Jaydattaji Kshirsagar

Member of the Maharashtra Legislative Assembly
- Incumbent
- Assumed office 2009
- Preceded by: Annasaheb D. V. Patil
- Constituency: Sindkheda
- In office 2004–2009
- Preceded by: Dr. Hemant Bhaskar Deshmukh
- Succeeded by: Padmakar Valvi
- Constituency: Shahada

Personal details
- Born: Jaykumar Jitendrasinh Rawal; 16 January 1975 (age 51) Dondaicha, Maharashtra, India
- Party: Bharatiya Janata Party
- Spouse: Subhadra Kumari
- Children: Jayaditya Singh (Son), Vedanteshwari Kumari (Daughter)
- Parent: Jitendrasinh Jaysinh Rawal
- Education: Business Management
- Alma mater: Cardiff University
- Occupation: Politician, businessman
- Website: www.mahabjp.org

Jaykumar Rawal is a member of Maharashtra Legislative Assembly. He represents the Sindkheda Constituency. Jaykumar Rawal is a descendant of the royal family of Dondaicha Sansthan and his grandfather Sahakar Maharshi Dadasaheb Rawal was the first MLA in 1952. He belongs to the Bharatiya Janata Party. Rawal was also Member of Legislative Assembly from Sindkheda in 2009. Rawal was one of the general secretaries of the Bharatiya Janata Party Maharashtra State unit in 2013. He is a Five term Member of the Maharashtra Legislative Assembly in 2004, 2009, 2014, 2019 and 2024.

Jaykumar was appointed Cabinet Minister in Expansion of Devendra Fadnavis Ministry and appointed Tourism, Employment Guarantee Scheme Minister on 8 July 2016. Jaykumar Rawal was appointed Food, Drugs and Protocol Minister in the government of Maharashtra on 4 June 2019.

== Positions held ==
=== Achievements ===
- Co- ordinator – Youth Forum, All party Young Legislator Association of Maharashtra consisting of 72 MLA's of all parties

(From 2004 till date)

- Student Representative as First Asian in Cardiff University England (UK).
- Played key role in establishing BJP in the district with very significant control over numerous local, political, social, educational, co-operative bodies
- For the first time in Dhule Zilla Parishad, BJP played a major role in establishing Shiv Sena in 2008
- Elected BJP mayor at Dhule Municipal Corporation in 2011 for the first time in history.
- Shindakheda Taluka BJP established power in Shindkheda taluka Municipalities, Panchayat Samiti, Bazar Samiti, Nagar Panchayat and Purchase and Sales Association.
- Got 2 M.P.s elected in Dhule & Nandurbar. Nandurbar M.P. defeated congress sitting minister, 2014
- Recently, BJP established power in Dhule Zilla Parishad, Dhule Municipal Corporation, DDC bank etc.

=== Within BJP ===
- National Secretary, BJYM Delhi.
- general secretary, BJP, Maharashtra (2013)
- Vice President, BJP Maharashtra State

=== Legislative ===
- Corporator, Municipality of Dondaicha - 2001-2004
- Member, Maharashtra Legislative Assembly – 2004–2009
- Member, Maharashtra Legislative Assembly – Re-elected in 2009
- Member, Maharashtra Legislative Assembly – Re-elected third Term in 2014
- Member, Maharashtra Legislative Assembly - Re-elected fourth Term in 2019
- Tourism, Employment Guarantee Scheme Cabinet Minister of Maharashtra since 8 July 2016-June 2019.
- Food and drugs administration, civil supplies and consumer protection, Tourism Cabinet Minister of Maharashtra since 4 June 2019
- Guardian Minister for Dhule District 2024

== See also ==
- Devendra Fadnavis ministry (2014–)
