= Talode Assembly constituency =

Former constituency of the Maharashtra legislative assembly in India

Talode
- Former constituency for the Maharashtra Legislative Assembly

Constituency details
- Country: India
- Region: Western India
- State: Maharashtra
- Lok Sabha constituency: Nandurbar
- Established: 1962
- Abolished: 2008

Talode (formerly Taloda) Vidhan Sabha seat was one of the constituencies of Maharashtra Vidhan Sabha, in India. It was a segment of Nandurbar Lok Sabha constituency. Talode seat existed until the 2004 elections.

== Members of Legislative Assembly ==
Year	Member	Party
1957	Padvi Gorji Surji (St)	Praja Socialist Party
1962	Digambar Narshi Padvi	Indian National Congress
1967	Digambar Narshi Padvi	Indian National Congress
1967 By-election	P. Vaharibai	Indian National Congress
1972	Dilwarsing D. Padvi	Bharatiya Jana Sangh
1978	Dilwarsing D. Padvi	Janata Party
1980	Abhimanyu Nurji Valvi	Indian National Congress
1985	Arjunsing Pirsing Valvi	Indian National Congress
1990	Dilwarsing D. Padvi	Bharatiya Janata Party
1995	Padvi Narendrasing Bhagatsing	Bharatiya Janata Party
1999	Padmakar Vijaysing Valvi	Indian National Congress
2004	Padmakar Vijaysing Valvi	Indian National Congress

== Election results ==
=== Assembly Election 2004 ===
2004 Maharashtra Legislative Assembly election : Talode
Party	Candidate	Votes	%	±%
INC	Padmakar Vijaysing Valvi	57,397	44.93%	▼8.00
BJP	Dr. Padvi Narendrasing Bhagatsing	50,595	39.61%	▲6.04
CPI(M)	Mali Jaysing Devachand	8,128	6.36%	New
Independent	Rahase Bharatsing Janya	5,570	4.36%	New
BSP	Valvi Nakul Pirsing	3,087	2.42%	New
Independent	Padvi Savitri Magan	2,971	2.33%	New
Margin of victory		6,802	5.32%	▼14.04
Turnout		128,689	69.21%	▲5.14
Total valid votes		127,748		
Registered electors		185,937		▲14.84
INC hold		Swing	▼8.00	

=== Assembly Election 1999 ===
1999 Maharashtra Legislative Assembly election : Talode
Party	Candidate	Votes	%	±%
INC	Padmakar Vijaysing Valvi	51,977	52.92%	▲36.66
BJP	Padvi Narendrasing Bhagatsing	32,962	33.56%	▼5.42
NCP	Valvi Lalsing Nurya	13,270	13.51%	New
Margin of victory		19,015	19.36%	▲3.37
Turnout		103,728	64.07%	▼4.41
Total valid votes		98,209		
Registered electors		161,907		▲7.97
INC gain from BJP		Swing	▲13.94	

=== Assembly Election 1995 ===
1995 Maharashtra Legislative Assembly election : Talode
Party	Candidate	Votes	%	±%
BJP	Padvi Narendrasing Bhagatsing	40,026	38.98%	▼16.42
Independent	Padmakar Vijaysing Valvi	23,608	22.99%	New
INC	Valvi Dhaku Daji	16,703	16.27%	▼2.05
CPI(M)	Mali Jaysing Devachand	13,340	12.99%	▼3.33
Independent	Padvi Darbarshing Gulabsing	3,921	3.82%	New
Independent	Valvi Abhimanyu Nuraji	2,624	2.56%	New
Independent	Padvi Vesta Tedagya	1,536	1.50%	New
Margin of victory		16,418	15.99%	▼21.09
Turnout		109,825	73.24%	▲11.72
Total valid votes		102,682		
Registered electors		149,952		▲16.08
BJP hold		Swing	▼16.42	

=== Assembly Election 1990 ===
1990 Maharashtra Legislative Assembly election : Talode
Party	Candidate	Votes	%	±%
BJP	Dilwarsing D. Padvi	40,619	55.40%	▲15.55
INC	Valvi Arjunsing Pirsing	13,431	18.32%	▼30.74
CPI(M)	Mali Jaysing Devachand	11,967	16.32%	▲11.52
Independent	Padvi Udesing Kocharya	5,892	8.04%	New
Independent	Sonwane Gangaram Sambhaji	708	0.97%	New
Independent	Padvi Jadu Surya	699	0.95%	New
Margin of victory		27,188	37.08%	▲27.87
Turnout		75,741	58.63%	▲10.57
Total valid votes		73,316		
Registered electors		129,183		▲29.58
BJP gain from INC		Swing	▲6.34	

=== Assembly Election 1985 ===
1985 Maharashtra Legislative Assembly election : Talode
Party	Candidate	Votes	%	±%
INC	Arjunsing Pirsing Valvi	22,591	49.06%	New
BJP	Dilwarsing D. Padvi	18,350	39.85%	▲19.34
Independent	Abhimanyu Nurji Valvi	2,788	6.06%	New
CPI(M)	Jaysing Devchand Mali	2,209	4.80%	New
Margin of victory		4,241	9.21%	▼18.96
Turnout		47,730	47.88%	▼2.51
Total valid votes		46,044		
Registered electors		99,693		▲9.30
INC gain from INC(I)		Swing	▲0.38	

=== Assembly Election 1980 ===
1980 Maharashtra Legislative Assembly election : Talode
Party	Candidate	Votes	%	±%
INC(I)	Abhimanyu Nurji Valvi	21,625	48.68%	New
BJP	Dilwarsing D. Padvi	9,112	20.51%	New
Independent	Padvi Jadu Surya	6,414	14.44%	New
Independent	Mali Bansi Shankar	4,216	9.49%	New
JP	Padvi Udesing Kocharya	3,052	6.87%	▼23.67
Margin of victory		12,513	28.17%	▲25.39
Turnout		46,432	50.91%	▼9.20
Total valid votes		44,419		
Registered electors		91,210		▲7.77
INC(I) gain from JP		Swing	▲18.14	

=== Assembly Election 1978 ===
1978 Maharashtra Legislative Assembly election : Talode
Party	Candidate	Votes	%	±%
JP	Dilwarsing D. Padvi	14,968	30.54%	New
Independent	Valvi Abhimanyu Nuraji	13,605	27.76%	New
INC	Padvi Bhagatsing Mansing	10,413	21.25%	▼22.44
Independent	Vaharu Fulsing Barade	6,596	13.46%	New
Independent	Patil Ashok Reshma	2,103	4.29%	New
Independent	Padvi Jekamsing Vesta	1,321	2.70%	New
Margin of victory		1,363	2.78%	▼2.97
Turnout		52,769	62.35%	▲21.26
Total valid votes		49,006		
Registered electors		84,633		▼2.92
JP gain from ABJS		Swing	▼18.90	

=== Assembly Election 1972 ===
1972 Maharashtra Legislative Assembly election : Talode
Party	Candidate	Votes	%	±%
ABJS	Dilwarsing D. Padvi	15,793	49.44%	New
INC	Goraji Suraji Padvi	13,956	43.69%	New
Independent	Abhimanyu Nurji Valvi	2,193	6.87%	New
Margin of victory		1,837	5.75%	
Turnout		34,391	39.45%	
Total valid votes		31,942		
Registered electors		87,175		
ABJS gain from INC		Swing		

=== Assembly By-election 1967 ===
1967 Maharashtra Legislative Assembly by-election : Talode
Party	Candidate	Votes	%	±%
INC	P. Vaharibai	24,037		
ABJS	N. J. Ganpat	9,080		
Margin of victory		14,957		
INC hold		Swing		

=== Assembly Election 1967 ===
1967 Maharashtra Legislative Assembly election : Talode
Party	Candidate	Votes	%	±%
INC	Digambar Narshi Padvi	21,500	56.07%	▼5.06
ABJS	J. G. Natawadkar	16,847	43.93%	▲23.23
Margin of victory		4,653	12.13%	▼28.29
Turnout		41,581	54.51%	▲12.28
Total valid votes		38,347		
Registered electors		76,275		▲47.63
INC hold		Swing	▼5.06	

=== Assembly Election 1962 ===
1962 Maharashtra Legislative Assembly election : Talode
Party	Candidate	Votes	%	±%
INC	Digambar Narshi Padvi	11,998	61.13%	▲21.32
ABJS	Ramu Dharma Padvi	4,064	20.71%	New
RPI	Keshawrao Uttamrao Naik	2,465	12.56%	New
Independent	Dhanji Inda Wasave	1,101	5.61%	New
Margin of victory		7,934	40.42%	▲20.04
Turnout		21,676	41.95%	▲8.72
Total valid votes		19,628		
Registered electors		51,666		▼13.51
INC gain from PSP		Swing	▲0.94	

=== Assembly Election 1957 ===
1957 Bombay State Legislative Assembly election : Talode
Party	Candidate	Votes	%	±%
PSP	Padvi Gorji Surji (St)	10,525	60.19%	New
INC	Bhil Janardan Poharya (St)	6,961	39.81%	New
Margin of victory		3,564	20.38%	
Turnout		17,486	29.27%	
Total valid votes		17,486		
Registered electors		59,733		
PSP win (new seat)				

== See also ==
- List of constituencies of Maharashtra Legislative Assembly
