= Udesingh Kocharu Padvi =

Indian politician

Member of the Maharashtra Legislative Assembly for Shahada
- In office 2014–2019
- Preceded by: Padmakar Vijaysing Valvi
- Succeeded by: Rajesh Udesing Padvi

Personal details
- Born: 22 July 1942 (age 84) Nagpur, Central Provinces and Berar, British India
- Party: Nationalist Congress Party
- Spouse(s): Late Kalabai Padvi; Archanabai Padvi
- Children: Rajesh Padvi, Nitin Padvi, Late Mahesh Padvi
- Occupation: Politician

Udesingh Kocharu Padvi is a member of the 13th Maharashtra Legislative Assembly. He represents the Shahada Assembly Constituency. He belongs to the Bharatiya Janata Party. In 2004, contesting as a Shiv Sena candidate, he had lost elections to the 84 - Akrani (ST) Assembly Constituency, losing to Kagda Chandya Padvi of the Indian National Congress. In 2009, he contested as a Shiv Sena candidate, from Shahada Assembly Constituency, losing to Padmakar Valvi of the Indian National Congress. Padvi is one of the two members of these assemblies who have assets over one crore but haven't given their Permanent Account Number. He has been described as "Crorepati MLA with no PAN".
