= Ravisheth Patil =

Indian politician

Member of Legislative Assembly Maharashtra
- Incumbent
- Assumed office 2019
- Preceded by: Dhairyashil Patil
- Constituency: Pen
- In office 2004–2009
- Preceded by: Mohan Mahadev Patil
- Succeeded by: Dhairyashil Patil
- Constituency: Pen

Personal details
- Born: February 11, 1950 (age 76)
- Party: Bharatiya Janata Party (2019-Present)
- Other political affiliations: Indian National Congress (before 2019)
- Profession: Politician

Ravisheth Patil Dagadu (born 11 February 1950) is an Indian politician from Maharashtra. He is a three time member of the Maharashtra Legislative Assembly. He was last elected from Pen Assembly constituency representing the Bharatiya Janata Party in the 2024 Maharashtra Legislative Assembly election. He served as a minister of state from 2004 to 2007 and as a cabinet minister from 2008 to 2009.

== Early life and education ==
Patil is from Pen, Raigad district, Maharashtra. He is the son of Dagadu Patil. He passed Class 12 and later while studying BA at JSM College, Alibag he dropped out in 1972.

== Career ==
Patil was first elected as an MLA in the year 2004 Maharashtra Legislative Assembly election representing the Indian National Congress. Later, he contested on the Indian National Congress ticket, and lost twice to the Peasants and Workers Party of India (PWPI) candidates in the 2009 and 2014 Maharashtra Legislative Assembly election. In 2009, he polled 53,141 votes against 60,757 votes polled by Dhairyashil Patil and lost by a margin of 7,616 votes. In 2014, he polled 60,496 while Dhairyashil got 64,616 votes for a victory by a margin of 4,120 votes.

He regained the seat in the 2019 Maharashtra Legislative Assembly election on the Bharatiya Janata Party ticket. In 2019, he got 112,380 votes and beat his closest opponent and two time sitting MLA, Dhairyashil Patil of the PWPI, by a margin of 24,051 votes. He won for a third time in the 2024 Maharashtra Legislative Assembly election. In 2024, he polled 124,631 votes and defeated his nearest rival, Prasad Dada Bhoir of Shiv Sena (Uddhav Balasaheb Thackeray) by a margin of 60,810 votes.
