= Dhairyashil Patil =

Indian politician (born 1971)

Member of Parliament, Rajya Sabha
- In office 28 August 2024 – 2 April 2026
- Preceded by: Udayanraje Bhosale
- Succeeded by: Vinod Tawde
- Constituency: Maharashtra

Member of Maharashtra Legislative Assembly
- In office 2009–2019
- Preceded by: Ravisheth Patil
- Succeeded by: Ravisheth Patil
- Constituency: Pen

Personal details
- Born: 22 March 1971 (age 55) Pen, Maharashtra, India
- Party: Bharatiya Janata Party (since 2023)
- Other political affiliations: Peasants and Workers Party of India (until 2023)
- Spouse: Nilima Patil (m. 1996)
- Children: 2 daughters
- Parents: Mohan Patil (father); Vijaya Patil (mother)
- Education: Bachelor of Engineering (Civil)
- Alma mater: University of Bombay
- Profession: Agriculturist; politician

Dhairyashil Mohan Patil (born 22 March 1971) is an Indian politician who served as Rajya Sabha member from Maharashtra from August 2024 till April 2026. Prior to that, he previously served as member of Maharashtra Legislative Assembly for Pen constituency between 2009 and 2019.

== Early life and education ==
Patil was born on 1971 in Pen, Maharashtra. His father, Mohan Mahadev Patil, was the state minister of Maharashtra, leader of Peasants and Workers Party of India and had served as MLA from Pen for 24 years until 2004.

He was a science student at a private High School in Pen, then he studied at University of Bombay. In 1991, he pursued a diploma of Civil Engineering in Bharati Vidyapeeth.

== Legislative career ==
Like his father, Patil joined Peasants and Workers Party of India and contested Pen seat in 2009 elections. He won by margin of 7,616 votes. He was re-elected in 2014.

Patil later lost the seat in 2019 elections to his rival Ravisheth Patil by a margin of 24,085 votes, after later switching from Congress to Bharatiya Janata Party. He joined Bharatiya Janata Party in December 2023. He was elected unopposed to Rajya Sabha in a by-election in August 2024.
