= Padmakar Valvi =

Indian politician

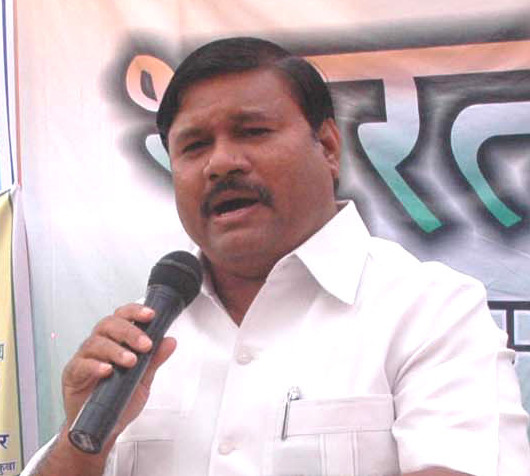

Member of Maharashtra Legislative Assembly
- In office (2009–2014)
- Preceded by: Jayakumar Jitendrasinh Rawal
- Succeeded by: Udesingh Kocharu Padvi
- Constituency: Shahada

Member of Maharashtra Legislative Assembly
- In office (1999-2004), (2004 – 2009)
- Preceded by: Narendrasing Padvi
- Constituency: Talode

Personal details
- Party: Indian National Congress
- Other political affiliations: Bharat Adivasi Party
- Occupation: Politician

Padmakar Vijaysingh Valvi is an Indian politician and member of the Indian National Congress. Valvi was a member of the Maharashtra Legislative Assembly.
