= Sindkheda Assembly constituency =

Constituency of the Maharashtra legislative assembly in India

Coordinates: 21.27°N 74.74°E

Sindkheda
- Constituency No. 8 for the Maharashtra Legislative Assembly

Constituency details
- Country: India
- Region: Western India
- State: Maharashtra
- District: Dhule
- Lok Sabha constituency: Dhule
- Established: 1951
- Total electors: 341,535
- Reservation: None

Member of Legislative Assembly
- 15th Maharashtra Legislative Assembly
- Incumbent Jayakumar Jitendrasinh Rawal
- Party: BJP
- Alliance: NDA
- Elected year: 2024

Sindkheda Assembly constituency seat is one of the five constituencies of the Maharashtra Vidhan Sabha (legislative assembly) located in Dhule district of the state in western India.

== Overview ==
This Vidhan Sabha constituency is a part of the Dhule Lok Sabha constituency along with five other Vidhan Sabha constituencies, namely, Dhule Rural and Dhule City in Dhule district and Malegaon Central, Malegaon Outer and Baglan in Nashik district.

== Members of the Legislative Assembly ==
Election	Member	Party
1952	Narayanrao Sahadeorao Patil	Indian National Congress
1957	Shankar Gorakh Sonawane	Praja Socialist Party
1962	Narayanrao Sahadeorao Patil	Indian National Congress
1967	Narayanrao Sahadeorao Patil	Indian National Congress
1972	Lilabai Uttamrao Patil	Indian National Congress
1978	Madhukarrao Dipchand Shisode	Independent politician
1980	Rangrao Madhavrao Patil	Indian National Congress (I)
1985	Mangalsing Nimji Rajput Alias Thansing Jibhau	Independent politician
1990	Dattatray Waman Bhadane	Indian National Congress
1995	Mangalsing Nimji Rajput Alias Thansing Jibhau	Janata Dal
1996 By-election	Annasaheb D. V. Patil	Independent politician
1999	Tatyasaheb alias Ramkrushna Dodha Patil	Shiv Sena
2004	Annasaheb D. V. Patil	Independent politician
2009	Jayakumar Jitendrasinh Rawal	Bhartiya Janata Party
2014	Jayakumar Jitendrasinh Rawal	Bhartiya Janata Party
2019	Jayakumar Jitendrasinh Rawal	Bhartiya Janata Party
2024	Jayakumar Jitendrasinh Rawal	Bhartiya Janata Party

== Election results ==
=== Assembly Election 2024 ===
2024 Maharashtra Legislative Assembly election : Sindkheda
Party	Candidate	Votes	%	±%
BJP	Jayakumar Jitendrasinh Rawal	151,492	67.40%	▲10.14
NCP-SP	Bedse Sandeep Tryambakrao	55,608	24.74%	New
Independent	Shamkant Raghunath Saner	11,886	5.29%	New
Independent	Salim Kasam Pinjari	1,944	0.86%	New
NOTA	None of the above	1,422	0.63%	▼0.28
Margin of victory		95,884	42.66%	▲21.07
Turnout		226,186	66.23%	▲4.85
Total valid votes		224,764		
Registered electors		341,535		▲4.42
BJP hold		Swing	▲10.14	

=== Assembly Election 2019 ===
2019 Maharashtra Legislative Assembly election : Sindkheda
Party	Candidate	Votes	%	±%
BJP	Jayakumar Jitendrasinh Rawal	113,809	57.26%	▲10.30
NCP	Bedse Sandeep Tryambakrao	70,894	35.67%	▲10.05
Independent	Shanabhau Rambhau Sonawane	9,358	4.71%	New
VBA	Namdeo Rohidas Yelave	2,025	1.02%	New
NOTA	None of the above	1,816	0.91%	▲0.27
Margin of victory		42,915	21.59%	▲0.26
Turnout		200,767	61.38%	▼3.41
Total valid votes		198,752		
Registered electors		327,082		▲6.52
BJP hold		Swing	▲10.30	

=== Assembly Election 2014 ===
2014 Maharashtra Legislative Assembly election : Sindkheda
Party	Candidate	Votes	%	±%
BJP	Jayakumar Jitendrasinh Rawal	92,794	46.96%	▼4.10
NCP	Bedse Sandeep Tryambakrao	50,636	25.62%	New
INC	Saner Shamkant Raghunath	48,025	24.30%	▲3.46
SS	Girase Rajendrasing Ramsing	2,263	1.15%	New
NOTA	None of the above	1,264	0.64%	New
Margin of victory		42,158	21.33%	▼8.89
Turnout		198,934	64.79%	▲3.47
Total valid votes		197,604		
Registered electors		307,064		▲11.95
BJP hold		Swing	▼4.10	

=== Assembly Election 2009 ===
2009 Maharashtra Legislative Assembly election : Sindkheda
Party	Candidate	Votes	%	±%
BJP	Rawal Jaikumarbhau Jitendrasinh	85,656	51.06%	New
INC	Saner Shamkant Raghunath	34,957	20.84%	New
Independent	Dr. Deshmukh Hemant Bhaskar	27,818	16.58%	New
Independent	Hemant Devidas Salunkhe	12,342	7.36%	New
BSP	Arjun Kondaji Bhoi	1,658	0.99%	▼1.29
Independent	Salim Kasam Pinjari	1,442	0.86%	New
Independent	Sanjay Bhavan Rajput	1,186	0.71%	New
Margin of victory		50,699	30.22%	▲25.39
Turnout		168,180	61.32%	▼4.80
Total valid votes		167,764		
Registered electors		274,283		▲54.39
BJP gain from Independent		Swing	▲21.69	

=== Assembly Election 2004 ===
2004 Maharashtra Legislative Assembly election : Sindkheda
Party	Candidate	Votes	%	±%
Independent	Annasaheb D. V. Patil	34,495	29.37%	New
SS	Patil Ramkrushna Dodha	28,823	24.54%	▼15.23
NCP	Bhamare Dnyaneshwar Ananda	26,504	22.57%	▼10.67
SP	Vijaysing Nathesinh Rajput	14,972	12.75%	New
Independent	Sisode Sanjeevani Sanjay	7,069	6.02%	New
BSP	Gavale Gulabrao Sahebrao	2,677	2.28%	New
BBM	Damodar Valmikrao Sukdeorao	1,152	0.98%	New
Independent	Teli Iqbal Bahadoor	988	0.84%	New
Margin of victory		5,672	4.83%	▼1.70
Turnout		117,471	66.12%	▲2.90
Total valid votes		117,441		
Registered electors		177,652		▲10.55
Independent gain from SS		Swing	▼10.40	

=== Assembly Election 1999 ===
1999 Maharashtra Legislative Assembly election : Sindkheda
Party	Candidate	Votes	%	±%
SS	Patil Ramkrushna Dodha	37,856	39.77%	▲8.85
NCP	Rawal Jitendrasinhg Jaysinhg Alias Sarkarsaheb	31,643	33.24%	New
INC	Patil Dattatraya Waman	24,046	25.26%	▲12.53
RJD	Vijaysing Nathesing Rajput	872	0.92%	New
Independent	Chetan Nathu Bagul	777	0.82%	New
Margin of victory		6,213	6.53%	▲3.36
Turnout		101,592	63.22%	▲1.19
Total valid votes		95,194		
Registered electors		160,701		▲5.63
SS gain from Independent		Swing	▲5.68	

=== Assembly By-election 1996 ===
1996 Maharashtra Legislative Assembly by-election : Sindkheda
Party	Candidate	Votes	%	±%
Independent	D. V. Patil	31,493	34.09%	New
SS	Patil Ramkrushna Dodha	28,562	30.92%	▲25.42
JD	Ashatai Mangalsing Alias Thansing Jeebhau	19,487	21.09%	▼13.00
INC	Patil Rangrao Madhavrao	11,764	12.73%	▼13.78
Independent	Patil Dattatray Dayaram	1,074	1.16%	New
Margin of victory		2,931	3.17%	▼4.41
Turnout		94,370	62.03%	▼5.57
Total valid votes		92,380		
Registered electors		152,142		▲1.04
Independent gain from JD		Swing	▲0.00	

=== Assembly Election 1995 ===
1995 Maharashtra Legislative Assembly election : Sindkheda
Party	Candidate	Votes	%	±%
JD	Rajput Mangalsing Nimji Alias Thansing Jibhau	33,801	34.09%	▲2.82
INC	Bhadane Dattatray Waman	26,283	26.51%	▼24.70
Independent	Sisode Snajay Madhukarao	13,436	13.55%	New
Independent	Chaudhari Hiraman Vithal	6,041	6.09%	New
SS	Desale Sudam Vitthal	5,450	5.50%	▲0.62
Independent	Wagh Ramdas Vitthal	3,751	3.78%	New
Independent	Sonawane Rajdhar Elaji	2,943	2.97%	New
BSP	Kapure Yuvraj Rambhau	1,385	1.40%	New
Margin of victory		7,518	7.58%	▼12.36
Turnout		101,786	67.60%	▼1.23
Total valid votes		99,144		
Registered electors		150,572		▲17.13
JD gain from INC		Swing	▼17.12	

=== Assembly Election 1990 ===
1990 Maharashtra Legislative Assembly election : Sindkheda
Party	Candidate	Votes	%	±%
INC	Bhadane Dattatray Waman	44,299	51.21%	▲23.11
JD	Rajput Thansing Jibhau Alias Mangalsing Nimji	27,050	31.27%	New
Independent	Sonawane Rajdhar Elaji	8,333	9.63%	New
SS	Moglaikar Sudhakar Sambhappa	4,225	4.88%	New
Independent	Mali Shankar Pandu	1,720	1.99%	New
Margin of victory		17,249	19.94%	▲15.46
Turnout		88,478	68.83%	▲7.33
Total valid votes		86,500		
Registered electors		128,555		▲14.52
INC gain from Independent		Swing	▲18.63	

=== Assembly Election 1985 ===
1985 Maharashtra Legislative Assembly election : Sindkheda
Party	Candidate	Votes	%	±%
Independent	Rajput Mangalsing Nimji Alias Thansing Jibhau	21,708	32.58%	New
INC	Patil Vidyatai Laxman	18,726	28.10%	New
Independent	Jawage Vasantrao Dharma	10,794	16.20%	New
BJP	Himmatrao Mali	10,067	15.11%	New
RPI	Kadhare Pundlik Kathu	1,983	2.98%	New
Independent	Appasaheb Baisane Jagannath Sobe	1,458	2.19%	New
Independent	Ratan Lotan Patil	672	1.01%	New
LKD	Laxman Babulal Khedwan	471	0.71%	New
Margin of victory		2,982	4.48%	▼0.01
Turnout		69,032	61.50%	▲1.08
Total valid votes		66,636		
Registered electors		112,255		▲8.27
Independent gain from INC(I)		Swing	▼2.52	

=== Assembly Election 1980 ===
1980 Maharashtra Legislative Assembly election : Sindkheda
Party	Candidate	Votes	%	±%
INC(I)	Patil Rangrao Madhavrao	21,320	35.10%	▲18.99
JP	Shisode Madhukarrao Dipchand	18,592	30.61%	New
Independent	Mali Himmatrao Bhatu	11,887	19.57%	New
INC(U)	Patil Naval Chaitram	8,722	14.36%	New
Margin of victory		2,728	4.49%	▲1.44
Turnout		62,641	60.42%	▼12.18
Total valid votes		60,733		
Registered electors		103,680		▲6.36
INC(I) gain from Independent		Swing	▲5.65	

=== Assembly Election 1978 ===
1978 Maharashtra Legislative Assembly election : Sindkheda
Party	Candidate	Votes	%	±%
Independent	Shisode Madhukarrao Dipchand	20,034	29.45%	New
JP	Rajput Mangalsing Nimji Alias Thansing Jibhau	17,956	26.40%	New
INC	Patil Shivajirao Giridhar	17,752	26.10%	▼32.05
INC(I)	Devare Dhanraj Motiram	10,958	16.11%	New
Independent	Bhil Bhagabai Navasha	1,109	1.63%	New
Margin of victory		2,078	3.05%	▼25.42
Turnout		70,768	72.60%	▲15.23
Total valid votes		68,027		
Registered electors		97,478		▲8.18
Independent gain from INC		Swing	▼28.70	

=== Assembly Election 1972 ===
1972 Maharashtra Legislative Assembly election : Sindkheda
Party	Candidate	Votes	%	±%
INC	Lilabai Uttamrao Patil	28,788	58.15%	▼7.38
SSP	Raghunath Chindha Patil	14,693	29.68%	New
Independent	Daulatrao Rupala Isi	3,659	7.39%	New
RPI	Savale Gajmal	1,485	3.00%	New
Independent	Ramraje Nirgun Vajir	884	1.79%	New
Margin of victory		14,095	28.47%	▼7.54
Turnout		51,693	57.37%	▼1.40
Total valid votes		49,509		
Registered electors		90,108		▲7.52
INC hold		Swing	▼7.38	

=== Assembly Election 1967 ===
1967 Maharashtra Legislative Assembly election : Sindkheda
Party	Candidate	Votes	%	±%
INC	Narayanrao Sahadeorao Patil	29,407	65.53%	▼2.43
PSP	R. C. Patil	13,246	29.52%	▲17.29
Independent	Z. D. Koli	2,224	4.96%	New
Margin of victory		16,161	36.01%	▼19.72
Turnout		49,249	58.77%	▼1.90
Total valid votes		44,877		
Registered electors		83,805		▼3.23
INC hold		Swing	▼2.43	

=== Assembly Election 1962 ===
1962 Maharashtra Legislative Assembly election : Sindkheda
Party	Candidate	Votes	%	±%
INC	Narayanrao Sahadeorao Patil	33,584	67.96%	▲21.13
PSP	Baburao Nabaji Desai	6,045	12.23%	▼40.94
ABJS	Padamsing Natusing Girase	5,956	12.05%	New
RPI	Punaji Lingaji Lalingker	2,700	5.46%	New
Independent	Pira Nanda Mahar	1,129	2.28%	New
Margin of victory		27,539	55.73%	▲49.39
Turnout		52,545	60.67%	▲14.30
Total valid votes		49,414		
Registered electors		86,602		▲24.58
INC gain from PSP		Swing	▲14.79	

=== Assembly Election 1957 ===
1957 Bombay State Legislative Assembly election : Sindkheda
Party	Candidate	Votes	%	±%
PSP	Sonawane Shankar Gorakh	17,139	53.17%	New
INC	Narayanrao Sahadeorao Patil	15,096	46.83%	▼14.33
Margin of victory		2,043	6.34%	▼30.47
Turnout		32,235	46.37%	▼10.74
Total valid votes		32,235		
Registered electors		69,513		▲46.61
PSP gain from INC		Swing	▼7.99	

=== Assembly Election 1952 ===
1952 Bombay State Legislative Assembly election : Sindkheda
Party	Candidate	Votes	%	±%
INC	Narayanrao Sahadeorao Patil	16,560	61.16%	New
Socialist	Khaire, Raghunath Chindha	6,592	24.35%	New
PWPI	Bhere, Nagojirao Lahujirao	3,925	14.50%	New
Margin of victory		9,968	36.81%	
Turnout		27,077	57.11%	
Total valid votes		27,077		
Registered electors		47,415		
INC win (new seat)				

== See also ==
- Sindkheda
- List of constituencies of Maharashtra Vidhan Sabha
