= Shevgaon Assembly constituency =

Constituency of the Maharashtra legislative assembly in India

Coordinates: 19.35°N 75.22°E

Shevgaon
- Constituency No. 222 for the Maharashtra Legislative Assembly

Constituency details
- Country: India
- Region: Western India
- State: Maharashtra
- District: Ahmednagar
- Lok Sabha constituency: Ahmednagar
- Established: 1952
- Total electors: 375,466
- Reservation: None

Member of Legislative Assembly
- 15th Maharashtra Legislative Assembly
- Incumbent Monika Rajiv Rajale
- Party: Bharatiya Janata Party
- Elected year: 2019

Shevgaon Assembly constituency is one of the 288 Vidhan Sabha (legislative assembly) constituencies of Maharashtra state, western India. This constituency is located in Ahmednagar district.

== Geographical scope ==
The constituency comprises Pathardi Municipal Council, Takali Manur and Pathardi belonging to Pathardi taluka and Shevgaon taluka.

== Members of the Legislative Assembly ==
Election	Member	Party
1952	Balasaheb alias Trimbak Shivram Bharde	Indian National Congress
1962	Marutrao Shankarao Ghule Patil	Indian National Congress
1967	Marutrao Shankarao Ghule Patil	Indian National Congress
1972	Vakilrao Baburao Langhe Patil	Communist Party of India
Before 2008: See Shegaon Assembly constituency
1978	Vakilrao Baburao Langhe Patil	Communist Party of India
1980	Sambhajirao Shankarrao Phatke	Indian National Congress (I)
1985	Sambhajirao Shankarrao Phatke	Indian National Congress
1990	Tukaram Gangadhar Gadakh Patil	Independent politician
1995	Pandurang Gamaji Abhang	Indian National Congress
1999	Narendra Marutraoji Ghule Patil	Nationalist Congress Party
2004	Narendra Marutraoji Ghule Patil	Nationalist Congress Party
Before 2008: See Shegaon Assembly constituency
2009	Chandrashekhar Marutraoji Ghule Patil	Nationalist Congress Party
2014	Monika Rajiv Rajale	Bharatiya Janata Party
2019	Monika Rajiv Rajale	Bharatiya Janata Party
2024	Monika Rajiv Rajale	Bharatiya Janata Party

== Election results ==
=== Assembly Election 2024 ===
2024 Maharashtra Legislative Assembly election : Shevgaon
Party	Candidate	Votes	%	±%
BJP	Monika Rajiv Rajale	99,775	38.15%	▼12.06
NCP-SP	Adv. Prataprao Babanrao Dhakne	80,732	30.87%	New
Independent	Chandrashekhar Marutraoji Ghule Patil	57,988	22.17%	New
Independent	Harshada Vidyadhar Kakade	12,232	4.68%	New
VBA	Kisan Jagannath Chavan	4,437	1.70%	▼2.58
Independent	Rajendra Rangnath Dhakane	1,923	0.74%	New
NOTA	None of the above	1,561	0.60%	▼0.38
Margin of victory		19,043	7.28%	▲0.90
Turnout		263,119	70.08%	▲3.85
Total valid votes		261,558		
Registered electors		375,466		▲9.83
BJP hold		Swing	▼12.06	

=== Assembly Election 2019 ===
2019 Maharashtra Legislative Assembly election : Shevgaon
Party	Candidate	Votes	%	±%
BJP	Monika Rajiv Rajale	112,509	50.21%	▼8.74
NCP	Adv. Prataprao Babanrao Dhakne	98,215	43.83%	▲8.16
VBA	Chavan Kisan Jagannath	9,599	4.28%	New
NOTA	None of the above	2,186	0.98%	▲0.27
Margin of victory		14,294	6.38%	▼16.90
Turnout		226,430	66.23%	▼6.63
Total valid votes		224,072		
Registered electors		341,873		▲8.24
BJP hold		Swing	▼8.74	

=== Assembly Election 2014 ===
2014 Maharashtra Legislative Assembly election : Shevgaon
Party	Candidate	Votes	%	±%
BJP	Monika Rajiv Rajale	134,685	58.95%	▲29.75
NCP	Chandrashekhar Marutraoji Ghule Patil	81,500	35.67%	▼3.06
SS	Babasaheb Uttam Dhakane	3,520	1.54%	New
INC	Ajay Sheshrao Raktate	1,941	0.85%	New
MNS	Khedkar Devidas Limbaji	1,780	0.78%	▼0.38
Independent	Kakade Shivaji Rohidas	1,763	0.77%	New
NOTA	None of the above	1,617	0.71%	New
Margin of victory		53,185	23.28%	▲13.75
Turnout		230,121	72.86%	▼2.02
Total valid votes		228,492		
Registered electors		315,833		▲11.77
BJP gain from NCP		Swing	▲20.22	

=== Assembly Election 2009 ===
2009 Maharashtra Legislative Assembly election : Shevgaon
Party	Candidate	Votes	%	±%
NCP	Chandrashekhar Marutraoji Ghule	81,890	38.73%	New
BJP	Adv. Prataprao Babanrao Dhakne	61,746	29.20%	New
Independent	Rajeev Appasaheb Rajale	43,351	20.50%	New
Independent	Harshada Vidyadhar Kakade	9,275	4.39%	New
Independent	Gorakshanath Nana Shelar	3,694	1.75%	New
CPI	Subhash Uttamrao Lande	2,923	1.38%	▼51.34
MNS	Shivaji Rao Garje	2,443	1.16%	New
Independent	Rajale Ashok Ramkisan	1,710	0.81%	New
Margin of victory		20,144	9.53%	▲4.09
Turnout		211,600	74.88%	▲7.85
Total valid votes		211,451		
Registered electors		282,571		▲207.18
NCP gain from CPI		Swing	▼13.99	

=== Assembly Election 1972 ===
1972 Maharashtra Legislative Assembly election : Shevgaon
Party	Candidate	Votes	%	±%
CPI	Langhe Vakilrao Baburao	31,329	52.72%	▲11.57
INC	Gadakh Yashwantrao Kankar	28,097	47.28%	▼4.32
Margin of victory		3,232	5.44%	▼5.01
Turnout		61,664	67.03%	▼2.18
Total valid votes		59,426		
Registered electors		91,989		▲16.47
CPI gain from INC		Swing	▲1.12	

=== Assembly Election 1967 ===
1967 Maharashtra Legislative Assembly election : Shevgaon
Party	Candidate	Votes	%	±%
INC	Marutrao Shankarao Ghule	26,610	51.60%	▼9.28
CPI	V. B. Langhe	21,223	41.15%	New
Independent	S. Y. Fatake	2,244	4.35%	New
Independent	A. A. Thore	1,494	2.90%	New
Margin of victory		5,387	10.45%	▼16.07
Turnout		54,662	69.21%	▲6.39
Total valid votes		51,571		
Registered electors		78,982		▲14.40
INC hold		Swing	▼9.28	

=== Assembly Election 1962 ===
1962 Maharashtra Legislative Assembly election : Shevgaon
Party	Candidate	Votes	%	±%
INC	Marutrao Shankarao Ghule	24,851	60.88%	▲5.50
Independent	Ekanath Laxman Bhagwat	14,027	34.36%	New
Independent	Shripati Nana Walhekar	1,940	4.75%	New
Margin of victory		10,824	26.52%	▲15.76
Turnout		43,374	62.82%	▲15.58
Total valid votes		40,818		
Registered electors		69,041		▲41.25
INC hold		Swing	▲5.50	

=== Assembly Election 1952 ===
1952 Bombay State Legislative Assembly election : Shevgaon
Party	Candidate	Votes	%	±%
INC	Bharde Trimbak Shivram	12,787	55.38%	New
CPI	Ekanath Laxman Bhagwat	10,303	44.62%	New
Margin of victory		2,484	10.76%	
Turnout		23,090	47.24%	
Total valid votes		23,090		
Registered electors		48,880		
INC win (new seat)				
