= Shegaon Assembly constituency =

Former constituency of Maharashtra, India

Coordinates: 20.79°N 76.69°E

Shegaon
- Former constituency for the Maharashtra Legislative Assembly

Constituency details
- Country: India
- Region: Western India
- State: Maharashtra
- District: Buldhana
- Established: 1951
- Abolished: 2008
- Total electors: 2,02,335
- Reservation: None

Shegaon Assembly constituency was one of the constituencies of Maharashtra Vidhan Sabha in the Buldhana district during 1967 and 1972 State elections. It was established in 1951 as then Madhya Pradesh Vidhan Sabha (Assembly) constituency located in Buldhana district. However it was dissolved for 1957 elections to Bombay state and 1962 elections to Maharashtra.

Since 1978 elections it does not exist and Jalamb Assembly constituency was re-established for the elections from 1978 till 2004.

== Members of the Legislative Assembly ==
Election	Member	Party
1952	Tukaram Ganpat Khumkar	Indian National Congress
1957	Ekanath Laxman Bhagwat	Independent politician
1967	T. P. Dhokne	Indian National Congress
1972	Kashiram Raybhan Patil	Peasants and Workers Party of India
1978	Vakilrao Baburao Langhe Patil	Communist Party of India
1980	Sambhajirao Shankarrao Phatke	Indian National Congress (I)
1985	Sambhajirao Shankarrao Phatke	Indian National Congress
1990	Tukaram Gangadhar Gadakh Patil	Independent politician
1995	Pandurang Gamaji Abhang	Indian National Congress
1999	Narendra Marutraoji Ghule Patil	Nationalist Congress Party
2004	Narendra Marutraoji Ghule Patil	Nationalist Congress Party
Onward 2008: See Shevgaon Assembly constituency
2009	Chandrashekhar Marutraoji Ghule Patil	Nationalist Congress Party
2014	Monika Rajiv Rajale	Bharatiya Janata Party
2019	Monika Rajiv Rajale	Bharatiya Janata Party
2024	Monika Rajiv Rajale	Bharatiya Janata Party

== Election results ==
=== Assembly Election 2004 ===
2004 Maharashtra Legislative Assembly election : Shegaon
Party	Candidate	Votes	%	±%
NCP	Narendra Marutraoji Ghule Patil	69,566	48.08%	▲0.79
BJP	Vitthalrao Vakilrao langhe	68,764	47.52%	▲5.37
Independent	Shaikh Rashid Babu (Inamdar)	1,913	1.32%	New
BSP	Vijay Rambhau Dhanwade	1,346	0.93%	New
Independent	Shaikh Altaf Chotubhai	1,098	0.76%	New
Margin of victory		802	0.55%	▼4.58
Turnout		1,44,749	71.54%	▼0.61
Total valid votes		1,44,692		
Registered electors		2,02,335		▲11.78
NCP hold		Swing	▲0.79	

=== Assembly Election 1999 ===
1999 Maharashtra Legislative Assembly election : Shegaon
Party	Candidate	Votes	%	±%
NCP	Narendra Marutraoji Ghule Patil	59,168	47.29%	New
BJP	Tukaram Gangadhar Gadakh	52,747	42.16%	▲38.31
INC	Ambade Nanasaheb Haribhau	11,500	9.19%	▼31.02
Margin of victory		6,421	5.13%	▲5.12
Turnout		1,30,588	72.15%	▼1.89
Total valid votes		1,25,126		
Registered electors		1,81,006		▲5.06
NCP gain from INC		Swing	▲7.07	

=== Assembly Election 1995 ===
1995 Maharashtra Legislative Assembly election : Shegaon
Party	Candidate	Votes	%	±%
INC	Pandurang Gamaji Abhang	51,297	40.21%	▼1.54
Independent	Tukaram Gangadhar Gadakh	51,285	40.21%	New
Independent	Purnale Treembak Kashinath	5,995	4.70%	New
BBM	Gajbhiv Bhanudas Honaji	5,738	4.50%	New
BJP	Malusare Tanaji Punjaram	4,901	3.84%	▲1.30
Independent	Langhe Harichchandra Bhimraj	1,435	1.12%	New
JD	Potdar Ramkrishna Madhavrao	1,296	1.02%	New
Margin of victory		12	0.01%	▼5.58
Turnout		1,30,758	75.90%	▲5.15
Total valid votes		1,27,557		
Registered electors		1,72,281		▲11.92
INC gain from Independent		Swing	▼7.13	

=== Assembly Election 1990 ===
1990 Maharashtra Legislative Assembly election : Shegaon
Party	Candidate	Votes	%	±%
Independent	Tukaram Gangadhar Gadakh	50,202	47.34%	New
INC	Marutrao Shankarrao Ghule Patil	44,278	41.76%	▼6.88
Independent	Najan Rambhau Maruti	4,928	4.65%	New
BJP	Take Dinkarrao Khanderao	2,694	2.54%	New
CPI	Lande Subhash Uttamrao	2,310	2.18%	▼21.47
Bharatiya Krishi Udyog Sangh	Pardeshi Vasant Shridhar	1,369	1.29%	New
Margin of victory		5,924	5.59%	▼16.95
Turnout		1,08,326	70.37%	▲13.53
Total valid votes		1,06,037		
Registered electors		1,53,931		▲25.90
Independent gain from INC		Swing	▼1.29	

=== Assembly Election 1985 ===
1985 Maharashtra Legislative Assembly election : Shegaon
Party	Candidate	Votes	%	±%
INC	Phatke Sambhajirao Shankarrao	32,915	48.64%	New
IC(S)	Mungase Murlidhar Baburao	17,665	26.10%	New
CPI	Langhe Vakilrao Baburao	16,004	23.65%	▼19.07
Independent	Shaikh Umar Afjal	574	0.85%	New
Independent	Rajemohite Hambirrao Krushnaji Appaji	517	0.76%	New
Margin of victory		15,250	22.53%	▲17.78
Turnout		69,656	56.97%	▲3.51
Total valid votes		67,675		
Registered electors		1,22,265		▲11.36
INC gain from INC(I)		Swing	▲1.16	

=== Assembly Election 1980 ===
1980 Maharashtra Legislative Assembly election : Shegaon
Party	Candidate	Votes	%	±%
INC(I)	Phatke Sambhajirao Shankarrao	27,025	47.48%	▲35.69
CPI	Langhe Vakilrao Baburao	24,318	42.72%	▲7.53
BJP	Take Dinkarrao Khanderrao	2,740	4.81%	New
Independent	Potdar Ramkrishana Madhav	1,634	2.87%	New
Independent	Palve Arjun Ratnaji	419	0.74%	New
Independent	Mohite Krishanaji Appaji	408	0.72%	New
RPI(K)	Kadam Malharrao Krishanaji	379	0.67%	New
Margin of victory		2,707	4.76%	▲3.29
Turnout		58,848	53.60%	▼16.88
Total valid votes		56,923		
Registered electors		1,09,794		▲11.23
INC(I) gain from CPI		Swing	▲12.29	

=== Assembly Election 1978 ===
1978 Maharashtra Legislative Assembly election : Shegaon
Party	Candidate	Votes	%	±%
CPI	Langhe Vakilrao Baburao	23,872	35.19%	New
INC	Nimbalkar Eknath Buvasaheb	22,877	33.72%	▼5.48
JP	Honde Vasantrao Kakaji	12,261	18.07%	New
INC(I)	Jadhav Bapurao Anantrao	7,998	11.79%	New
Independent	Mohite Krishanaji Appaji	828	1.22%	New
Margin of victory		995	1.47%	▼11.29
Turnout		70,276	71.19%	▼2.06
Total valid votes		67,836		
Registered electors		98,710		▲2.97
CPI gain from PWPI		Swing	▼16.77	

=== Assembly Election 1972 ===
1972 Maharashtra Legislative Assembly election : Shegaon
Party	Candidate	Votes	%	±%
PWPI	Kashiram Raybhan Patil	35,257	51.96%	▲12.84
INC	Alsi Yaminibai Digamber	26,602	39.20%	▼9.02
ABJS	Ajabrao D. Deshmukh	3,819	5.63%	▼2.86
RPI	Suradkar Janardhan Janu	2,180	3.21%	New
Margin of victory		8,655	12.75%	▲3.65
Turnout		70,355	73.39%	▲2.56
Total valid votes		67,858		
Registered electors		95,865		▲9.30
PWPI gain from INC		Swing	▲3.73	

=== Assembly Election 1967 ===
1967 Maharashtra Legislative Assembly election : Shegaon
Party	Candidate	Votes	%	±%
INC	T. P. Dhokne	28,859	48.23%	▲6.53
PWPI	Kashiram Raybhan Patil	23,409	39.12%	New
ABJS	Ajabrao D. Deshmukh	5,078	8.49%	New
Independent	N. G. Sardar	1,111	1.86%	New
Independent	S. S. Bodkhe	994	1.66%	New
Independent	S. G. Gavande	389	0.65%	New
Margin of victory		5,450	9.11%	▼7.50
Turnout		66,089	75.35%	▲13.40
Total valid votes		59,840		
Registered electors		87,706		▲50.60
INC gain from Independent		Swing	▼10.08	

=== Assembly Election 1957 ===
1957 Bombay State Legislative Assembly election : Shegaon
Party	Candidate	Votes	%	±%
Independent	Ekanath Laxman Bhagwat	18,618	58.30%	New
INC	Navale Raosahib Babaji	13,315	41.70%	▼21.72
Margin of victory		5,303	16.61%	▼30.40
Turnout		31,933	54.83%	▼4.11
Total valid votes		31,933		
Registered electors		58,237		▲24.82
Independent gain from INC		Swing	▼5.11	

=== Assembly Election 1952 ===
1952 Madhya Pradesh Legislative Assembly election : Shegaon
Party	Candidate	Votes	%	±%
INC	Tukaram Ganpat Khumkar	17,439	63.41%	New
SKP	Pandurang Narayan Pise	4,511	16.40%	New
Independent	Laxman Rustum Deshmukh	3,290	11.96%	New
ABJS	Rajaram Ganpat Kolare	1,792	6.52%	New
Independent	Fakira Ishna Landge	468	1.70%	New
Margin of victory		12,928	47.01%	
Turnout		27,500	58.94%	
Total valid votes		27,500		
Registered electors		46,657		
INC win (new seat)				

== See also ==
- Shegaon
- Khamgaon Assembly constituency
- Jalgaon (Jamod) Assembly constituency
