= 1995 Maharashtra Legislative Assembly election =

State assembly election in India

Maharashtra Legislative Assembly Election 1995
- 12 February, 9 March 1995

All 288 assembly constituencies 145 seats needed for a majority
- Turnout: 71.69% (▲9.43%)
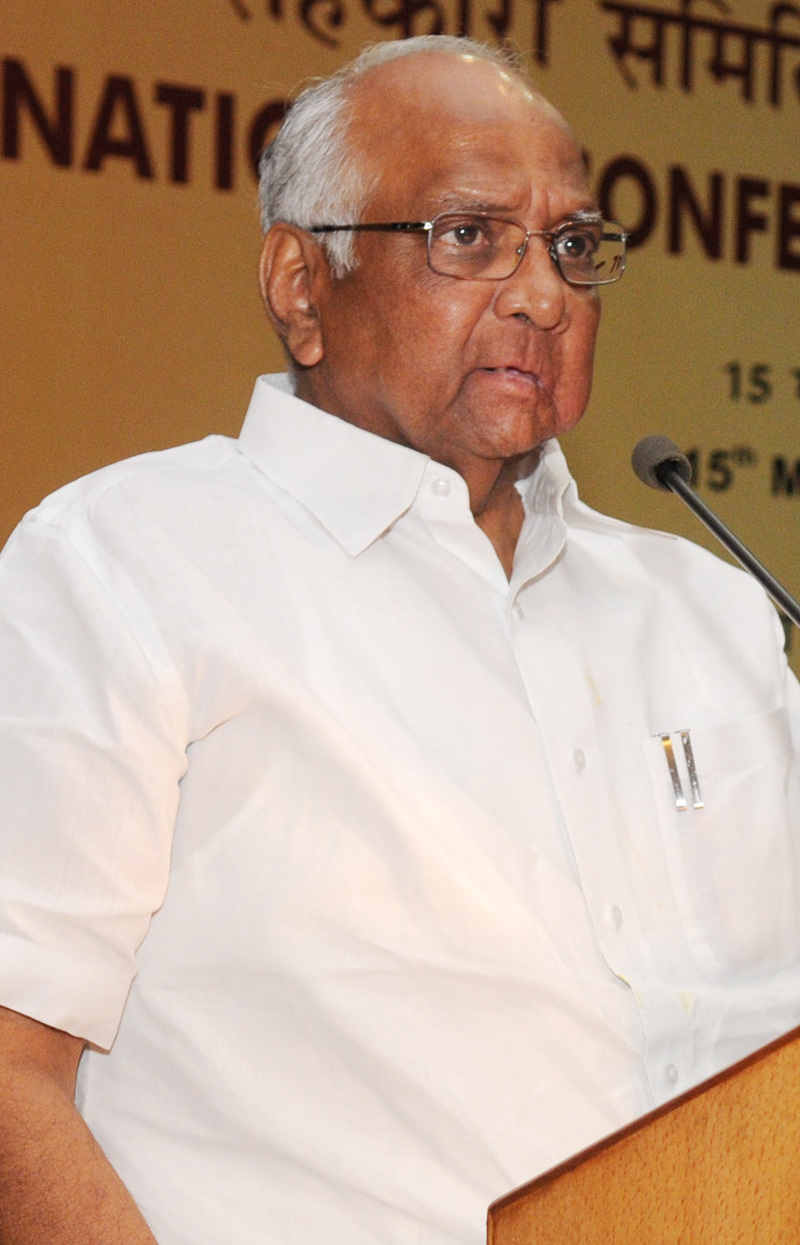

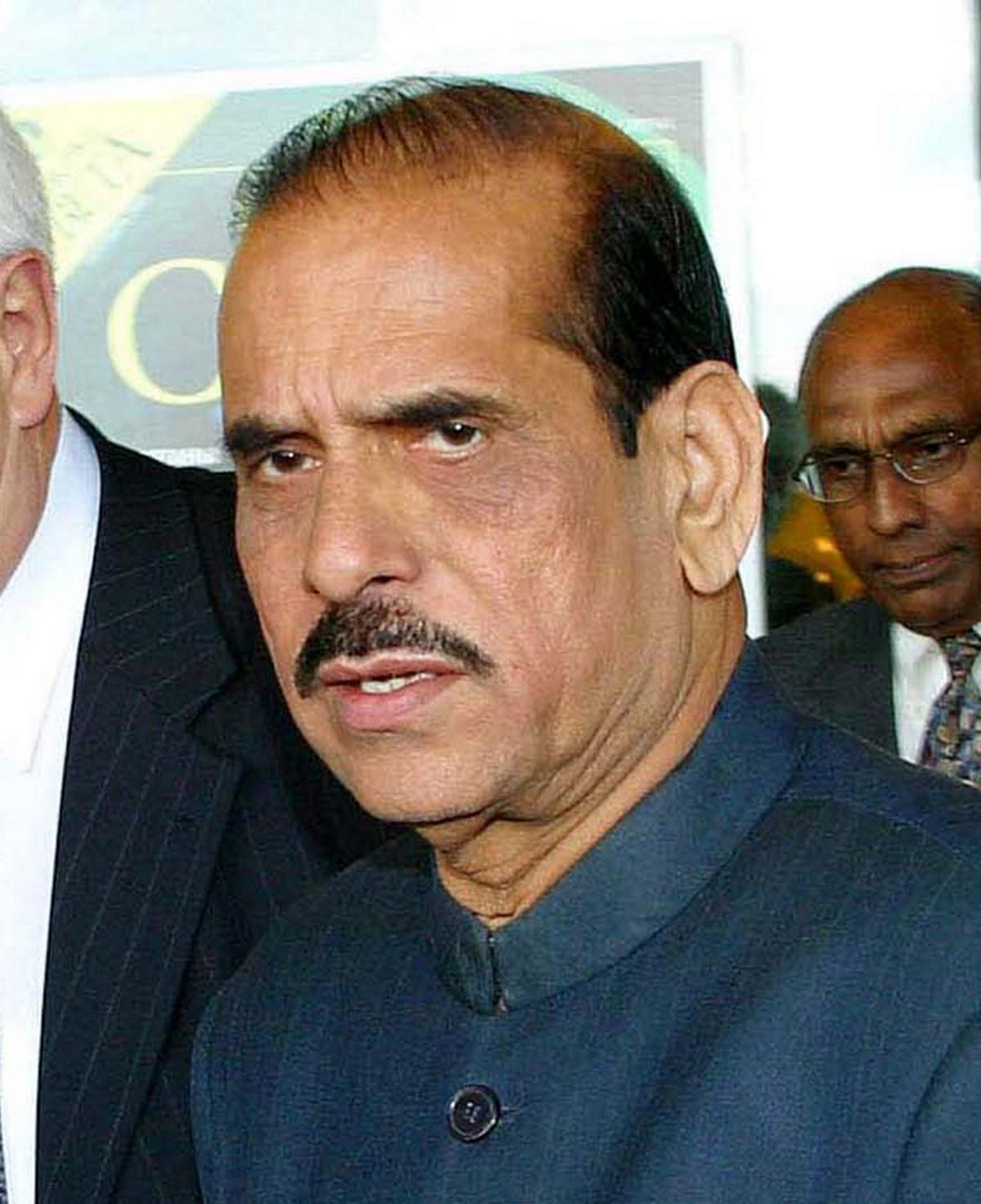

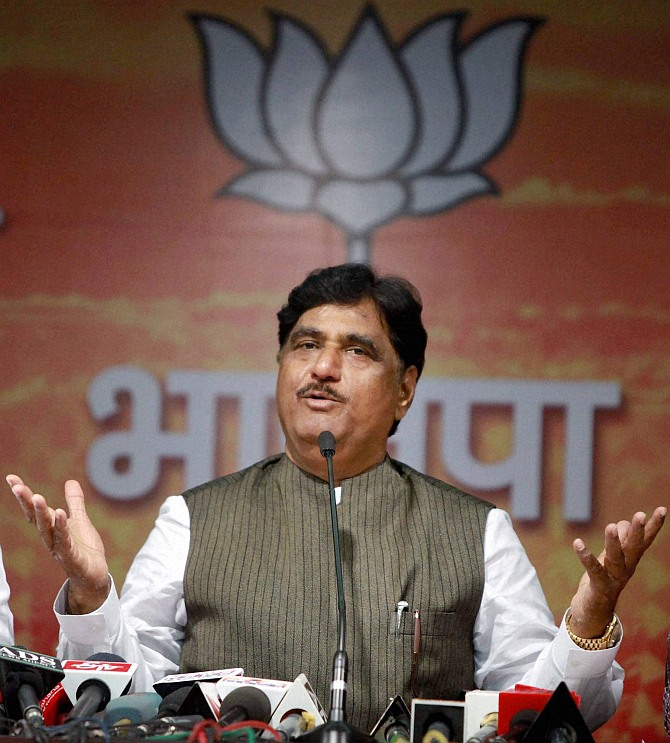
	Majority party	Minority party	Third party
Leader	Sharad Pawar	Manohar Joshi	Gopinath Munde
Party	INC	SS	BJP
Alliance	INC+	Yuti	Yuti
Leader's seat	Did not contest	Dadar	Renapur
Last election	141	52	42
Seats won	80	73	65
Seat change	▼61	▲21	▲23
Popular vote	11,941,832	6,315,493	4,932,767
Percentage	31.00%	16.39%	12.80%
Swing	▼7.17 pp	▲0.45 pp	▲2.09 pp
Chief Minister before election
Sharad Pawar
INC
Elected Chief Minister
Manohar Joshi
Shiv Sena

Assembly elections 1995 was held in Maharashtra, India in two phases on February 12, 1995, and March 9, 1995. Election results were declared on March 13, 1995. The major parties were Bharatiya Janata Party - Shiv Sena Yuti (alliance) against the Congress.

== Parties and alliances ==
Party	Flag	Symbol	Leader	Seats
Indian National Congress			Sharad Pawar	286

Yuti
Party	Flag	Symbol	Leader	Seats
Shiv Sena			Manohar Joshi	169
Bharatiya Janata Party			Gopinath Munde	116
Total				285

== Results ==
List of Political Parties participated in 1995 Maharashtra Assembly Elections.

Party	Abbreviation
National Parties
Bharatiya Janata Party	BJP
Indian National Congress	INC
Janata Party	JP
Janata Dal	JD
Samata Party	SAP
Communist Party of India (Marxist)	CPM
Communist Party of India	CPI
State Parties
Shiv Sena	SHS
Indian Union Muslim League	IUML
Muslim League Kerala State Committee	MUL
Indian Congress (Socialist) – SCS	ICS(SCS)
Samajwadi Party	SP
Sikkim Sangram Parishad	SSP
Peasants and Workers Party	PWP
All India Forward Bloc	AIFB
Bahujan Samaj Party	BSP
Registered (Unrecognised) Parties
Akhil Bharatiya Jana Sangh	ABJS
Indian National League	INL
People's Democratic Party	PDP
Doordarshi Party	DDP
Maharashtra Rashtravadi Congress	MRC
Hindustan Janata Party	HJP
Samajwadi Janata Party (Rashtriya)	SJP(R)
Samajwadi Janata Party (Maharashtra)	SJP(M)
Republican Party of India	RPI
Republican Party of India (Khobragade)	RPI(K)
Bharipa Bahujan Mahasangh	BBM
Bharatiya Minorities Suraksha Mahasangh	BMSM
Nag Vidarbha Andolan Samiti	NVAS
National Republican Party	NRP
Proutist Sarva Samaj Samiti	PSSS
Rashtriya Samaj Sevak Dal	RSSD
Maharashtra Vikas Congress	MVC
Democratic Party of India	DPI
Native People's Party	NVPP
Vidarbha Praja Party	VPP

In the election Shiv Sena and Bharatiya Janata Party Alliance or Mahayuti got the majority. Manohar Joshi from Shiv Sena became the 12th Chief minister of Maharashtra, Thus, forming the first Non-Congress Government in Maharashtra.

The details are as follows:

Summary of results of the Maharashtra State Assembly election, 1995

Political Party	Seats			Popular Vote		
Political Party	Contested	Won	+/-	Votes polled	Votes%	+/-
Indian National Congress 80 / 288 (28%)	286	80	▼61	1,19,41,832	31.00%	▼7.17%
Shiv Sena 73 / 288 (25%)	169	73	▲21	63,15,493	16.39%	▲0.45%
Bharatiya Janata Party 65 / 288 (23%)	116	65	▲23	49,32,767	12.80%	▲2.09%
Janata Dal 11 / 288 (4%)	182	11	▼13	22,58,914	5.86%	▼6.86%
Peasants and Workers Party of India 6 / 288 (2%)	42	6	▼2	7,88,286	2.05%	▼0.37%
Communist Party of India (Marxist) 3 / 288 (1%)	18	3	Steady	3,86,009	1.00%	▲0.13%
Samajwadi Party 3 / 288 (1%)	22	3	▲3	3,56,731	0.93%	▲0.93% (New Party)
Nag Vidarbha Andolan Samiti 1 / 288 (0.3%)	2	1	▲1	82,677	0.21%	▲0.21% (New Party)
Maharashtra Vikas Congress 1 / 288 (0.3%)	3	1	▲1	45,404	0.12%	▲0.12% (New Party)
Bharipa Bahujan Mahasangh	129	0	(New Party)	1,167,686	3.03%	▲3.03% (New Party)
Bahujan Samaj Party	145	0	Steady	572,336	1.49%	▲1.07%
Communist Party of India	17	0	▼2	123,185	0.32%	▼0.42%
Indian Congress (Socialist) – SCS	19	0	▼1	65,037	0.17%	▼0.81%
Republican Party of India (Khobragade)	13	0	▼1	63,741	0.17%	▼0.33%
Indian Union Muslim League	5	0	▼1	4,208	0.01%	▼0.50%
Independents 45 / 288 (16%)	3196	45	▲32	91,04,036	23.63%	▲10.04%
Total	4727	288	Steady	38,526,206	71.69%	▲9.43%

== Chief Ministerial Candidate ==
=== Shiv Sena-Bhartiya Janata Party National Democratic Alliance ===
Shiv Sena	Bharatiya Janata Party
National Democratic Alliance
For Chief Minister
Manohar Joshi Shiv Sena

=== Indian National Congress ===
Indian National Congress

United Progressive Alliance

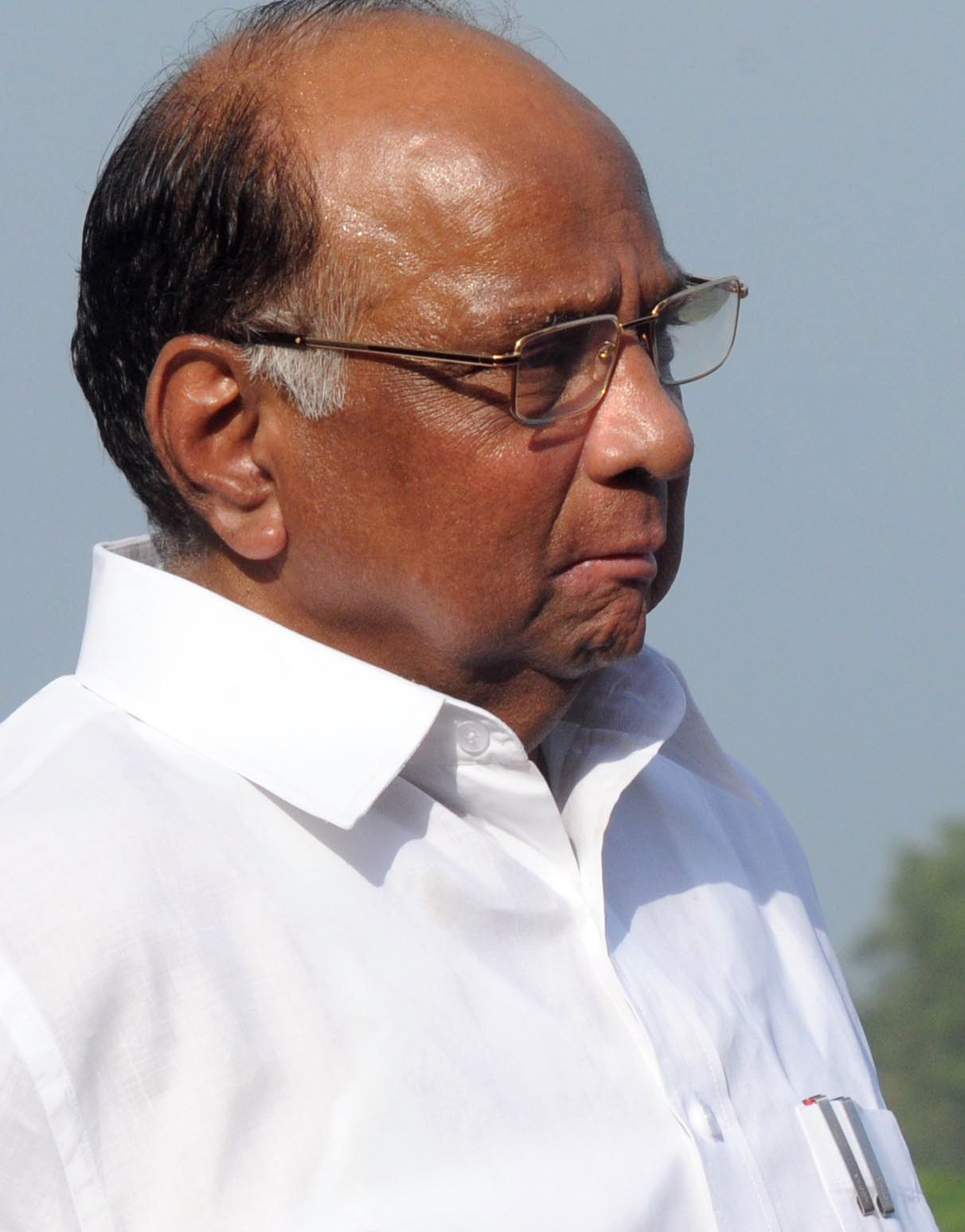

Sharad Pawar

Indian National Congress

== Region-wise Breakup ==
Region	Total seats				OTH
Region	Total seats	INC	SHS	BJP	OTH
Region	Total seats	Seats Won	Seats Won	Seats Won	
Western Maharashtra	75	37	09	05	22
Vidarbha	66	17	11	22	16
Marathwada	46	12	15	09	10
Thane+Konkan	31	03	15	06	07
Mumbai	34	01	18	12	03
North Maharashtra	36	10	05	10	11
Total	288	80	73	65	70

Region	Total seats	Indian National Congress		Shiv Sena		Bharatiya Janata Party		Janata Dal	
Western Maharashtra	70	39 / 70 (56%)	▼17	09 / 70 (13%)	▲05	06 / 70 (9%)	▼02	03 / 70 (4%)	▼05
Vidarbha	62	14 / 62 (23%)	▼11	11 / 62 (18%)	▲07	20 / 62 (32%)	▲07	02 / 62 (3%)	▼07
Marathwada	46	11 / 46 (24%)	▼10	15 / 46 (33%)	▲01	10 / 46 (22%)	▲05	02 / 46 (4%)	Steady
Thane+Konkan	39	03 / 39 (8%)	▼05	14 / 39 (36%)	▲03	06 / 39 (15%)	▲01	0 / 39 (0%)	▼02
Mumbai	36	01 / 36 (3%)	▼07	18 / 36 (50%)	▲03	12 / 36 (33%)	▲03	0 / 36 (0%)	Steady
North Maharashtra	35	12 / 35 (34%)	▼10	06 / 35 (17%)	▲02	11 / 35 (31%)	▲03	04 / 35 (11%)	▲01
Total	288	80 / 288 (28%)	▼61	73 / 288 (25%)	▲21	65 / 288 (23%)	▲23	11 / 288 (4%)	▼13

Alliance Wise Results:-

80	73	65
INC	SHS	BJP

Region	Total Seats	National Democratic Alliance		Indian National Congress+		Janata Dal		Others	
Western Maharashtra	70	▲10	23 / 70 (33%)	▼4	28 / 70 (40%)	▼8	1 / 70 (1%)	▲1	19 / 70 (27%)
Vidarbha	62	▲11	31 / 62 (50%)	▼20	11 / 62 (18%)	▼1	8 / 62 (13%)	▲10	12 / 70 (17%)
Marathwada	46	▲12	27 / 46 (59%)	▼12	12 / 46 (26%)	▼5	2 / 46 (4%)	Steady	5 / 46 (11%)
Thane +Konkan	39	▲12	31 / 39 (79%)	▼9	3 / 39 (8%)		Steady	▲2	5 / 39 (13%)
Mumbai	36	▼8	16 / 36 (44%)	▼8	3 / 36 (8%)		Steady	▲15	17 / 36 (47%)
North Maharashtra	35	▲7	10 / 35 (29%)	▼8	23 / 35 (66%)		Steady	▲1	2 / 35 (6%)
Total		▲44	138 / 288 (48%)	▼61	80 / 288 (28%)	▼13	11 / 288 (4%)	▲31	60 / 288 (21%)

Vidhan Sabha Results
1. Indian National Congress (28.0%)
2. Shiv Sena (26.0%)
3. Bharatiya Janata Party (22.0%)
4. Others/Independents (24.0%)

Division	District	Seats	INC		SHS		BJP		OTH
Konkan division	Sindhudurg	04	01		02		01		00
Konkan division	Ratnagiri	07	00		05		02		00
Konkan division	Raigad	07	01		03		00		03
Konkan division	Mumbai (City)	17	01		08		05		03
Konkan division	Mumbai (Suburban)	17	00		10		07		00
Konkan division	Thane + Palghar	13	01		05		03		04
		52	04		28		15		10
Nashik division	Nashik	14	03		04		03		04
Nashik division	Dhule + Nandurbar	10	04		00		02		04
Nashik division	Jalgaon	12	03		01		05		03
		36	10		05		10		11
Amravati division	Buldhana	07	01		02		02		02
Amravati division	Akola + Washim	10	01		03		04		02
Amravati division	Amravati	08	02		02		03		01
Amravati division	Yavatmal	08	04		01		02		01
		33	08		08		11		06
Nagpur division	Wardha	04	03		01		00		00
Nagpur division	Nagpur	11	03		00		03		05
Nagpur division	Bhandara + Gondia	09	01		01		06		01
Nagpur division	Gadchiroli	03	01		01		00		01
Nagpur division	Chandrapur	06	01		00		02		03
		33	09		03		11		10
Aurangabad division	Nanded	08	04		03		01		00
Aurangabad division	Parbhani + Hingoli	08	02		03		01		02
Aurangabad division	Jalna	05	01		03		01		00
Aurangabad division	Auranagabad	07	02		02		02		01
Aurangabad division	Beed	06	00		01		01		04
Aurangabad division	Latur	07	02		00		03		02
Aurangabad division	Osmanabad	05	01		03		00		01
		46	12		15		09		10
Pune division	Solapur	13	06		01		02		04
Pune division	Ahmednagar	13	10		01		01		01
Pune division	Pune	18	08		05		03		02
Pune division	Satara	10	04		01		00		06
Pune division	Sangli	09	02		00		00		07
Pune division	Kolhapur	12	07		01		00		04
Total Seats		75	37		09		06		24
Total Seats		288	80	▼61	73	▲21	65	▲23	70

Alliance	Political Party	Seats Won	Total Seats
NDA	Shiv Sena	73	152
NDA	Bharatiya Janata Party	65	152
NDA	Independents	14	152
INC+	Indian National Congress	80	120
INC+	Peasants and Workers Party of India	6	120
INC+	Samajwadi Party	3	120
INC+	Independents	31	120

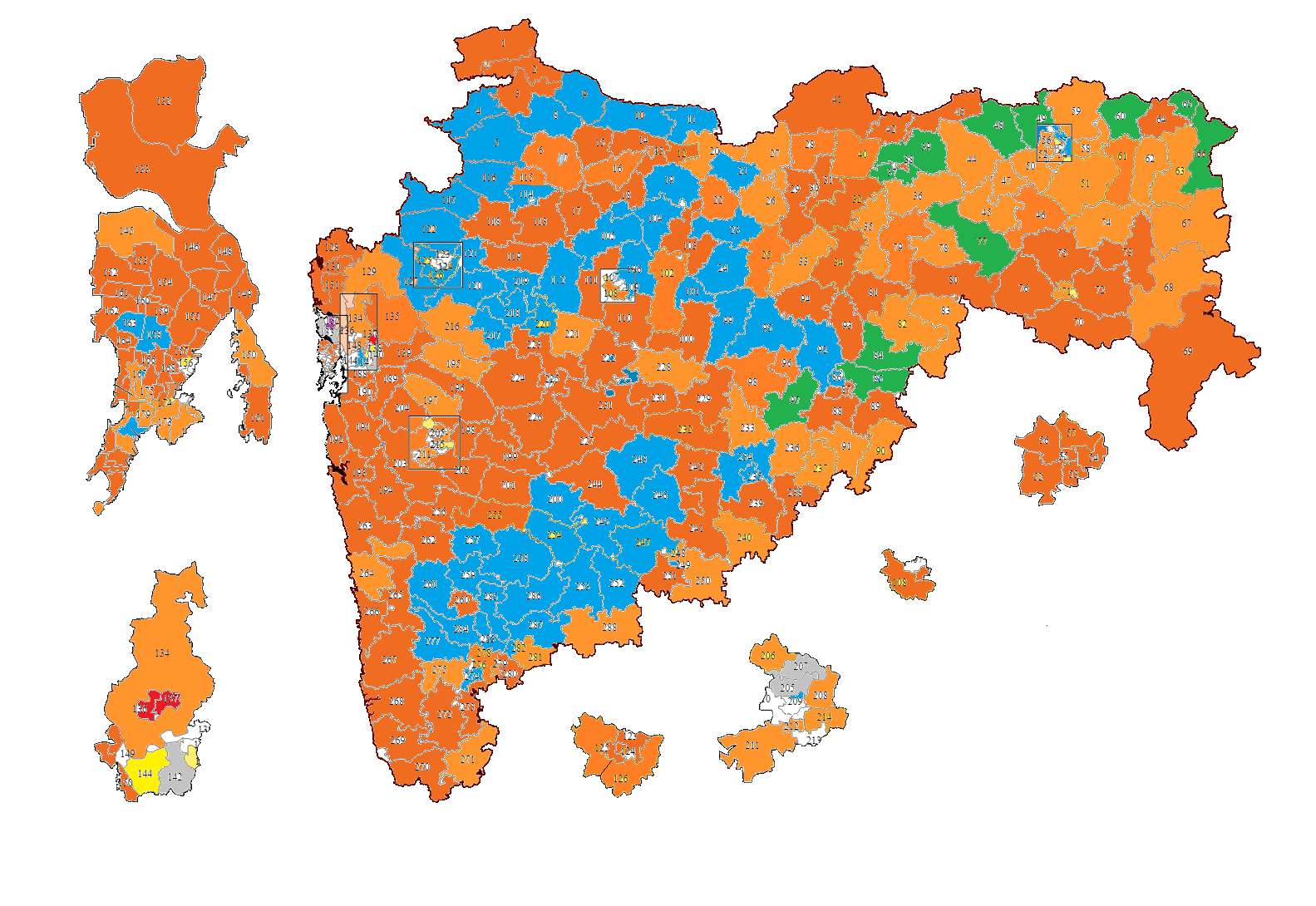

The Shiv Sena and BJP won primarily by opposing incumbent chief minister Sharad Pawar's decision to approve a power project of Enron at Dabhol. The $2.8 billion project was being stalled on charges of corruption.

To save the project after the elections, Enron's Rebecca Mark rushed from United States to India. She officially scheduled her meeting with Chief Minister Manohar Joshi at the Secretariat House on 1 November 1995. But before that, she was called to Matoshree to meet Shiv Sena Chief Balasaheb Thackeray. He not only involved himself in the project and key decisions but also decided the appointments of top bureaucrats.

== Results by constituency ==
Winner, runner-up, voter turnout, and victory margin in every constituency
Assembly Constituency		Turnout	Winner				Runner Up				Margin
#k	Names	%	Candidate	Party	Votes	%	Candidate	Party	Votes	%	Margin
1	Sawantwadi	74.89	Bhonsle Pravin Prataprao	INC	39,849	36.84	Palav Varsha Liladhar	SS	31,375	29.00	8,474
2	Vengurla	75.52	Kambali Shankar Shivram	SS	41,961	42.96	Sawant Pushpasen Bhivaji	JD	25,986	26.61	15,975
3	Malvan	79.88	Narayan Tatu Rane	SS	56,101	57.22	Naik Vijay Vishnu	INC	34,334	35.02	21,767
4	Deogad	79.95	Janardan Moreshwar Gogate	BJP	51,352	54.91	Nandkumar Laxman Ghate	INC	32,147	34.37	19,205
5	Rajapur	76.25	Appa Alias Vijayrao Salvi	SS	58,550	58.35	Hatankar Laxman Rangnath	INC	27,935	27.84	30,615
6	Ratnagiri	71.03	Gotad Shivajirao Ramchandra	BJP	56,710	46.91	Suhas Waman Alias Kumar Shetye	IND	29,860	24.70	26,850
7	Sangameshwar	76.63	Ravindra Muralidhar Mane	SS	54,655	51.91	Rakhangi Mohammed Shaikh Hussain	INC	31,409	29.83	23,246
8	Guhagar	74.56	Dr. Vinay Shridhar Natu	BJP	57,789	58.63	Adv. Mohite Dayanand Bhaguram	INC	20,377	20.67	37,412
9	Chiplun	79.54	Bhaskar Jadhav	SS	49,795	48.80	Balasaheb Bendu Mate	INC	42,476	41.63	7,319
10	Khed	78.56	Ramdas Gangaram Kadam	SS	67,344	67.45	Bhosle Asha Keshavrao	INC	30,369	30.42	36,975
11	Dapoli	80.44	Dalvi Suryakant Shivram	SS	64,975	63.38	Posture Daulatrao Pandurang	INC	37,539	36.62	27,436
12	Mahad	80.30	Prabhakar Sundarrao More	SS	41,705	41.23	Arun Deshmukh	INC	21,123	20.88	20,582
13	Shrivardhan	78.38	Sawant Shyam Tukaram	SS	48,349	42.36	Raut Ravindra Narayan	INC	30,658	26.86	17,691
14	Mangaon	78.49	Sunil Tatkare	INC	44,569	42.11	Ghosalkar Vinod Ramchandra	SS	31,175	29.45	13,394
15	Pen	74.52	Mohan Mahadeo Patil	PWPI	43,027	35.95	Ravindranath Dagadu Patil	INC	42,034	35.12	993
16	Alibag	74.71	Meenakshi Patil	PWPI	61,569	45.03	Kawale Vijay Namdev	INC	38,380	28.07	23,189
17	Panvel	72.60	Vivek Shankar Patil	PWPI	62,485	38.95	Ganapat Ragho Patil Alias G. R. Patil	INC	49,619	30.93	12,866
18	Khalapur	73.77	Devendra Vitthal Satam	SS	50,575	35.67	Ulhas Gajanan Deshumukh	INC	35,783	25.24	14,792
19	Colaba	48.87	Dhatrak Ashok Gangaram	INC	29,256	52.14	Narwekar Suresh Murari	SS	21,178	37.74	8,078
20	Umarkhadi	54.14	Bashir Moosa Patel	SP	20,950	34.10	Hemant Krishna Koli	SS	19,344	31.48	1,606
21	Mumbadevi	55.62	Raj K. Purohit	BJP	32,089	62.84	Bhanwarsingh Narayansingh Rajpurohit	INC	14,451	28.30	17,638
22	Khetwadi	61.73	Raichura Mohan D.	BJP	30,305	46.61	Memon Yaqoob Jan Mohamed	SP	17,419	26.79	12,886
23	Opera House	60.82	Chandrakant Shankar Padwal	SS	36,321	64.07	Sujata Dhawale	INC	17,602	31.05	18,719
24	Malabar Hill	57.59	Mangal Prabhat Lodha	BJP	43,735	48.28	Balvantray Ambelal Desai	INC	41,817	46.16	1,918
25	Chinchpokli	55.72	Faiyaz Ahmed	JD	20,573	28.39	Madhu Chavan	INC	15,656	21.60	4,917
26	Nagpada	57.52	Lokhandwala Suhail Haji Umer	SP	23,099	33.60	Dilip Balaram Tammal	SS	20,793	30.24	2,306
27	Mazgaon	65.51	Bala Nandgaonkar	SS	41,729	53.04	Chhagan Bhujbal	INC	29,454	37.43	12,275
28	Parel	67.19	Desai Suryakant Gangaram	SS	46,574	51.34	Dr. Jagannathrao Hegde	INC	22,061	24.32	24,513
29	Shivadi	62.40	Rane Dattatraya Mahadeo	BJP	35,305	39.14	Gaikwad Sumant Sitaram	INC	18,900	20.95	16,405
30	Worli	66.59	Dattaji Nalawade	SS	49,802	57.28	Adv. Vasantrao Vittal Suryawanshi	INC	28,267	32.51	21,535
31	Naigaon	67.37	Kolambkar Kalidas Nilkanth	SS	57,383	60.25	Vilas Vishnu Sawant	INC	25,948	27.25	31,435
32	Dadar	66.98	Manohar Joshi	SS	58,901	68.34	Sharayu Govind Thakur	INC	20,482	23.77	38,419
33	Matunga	55.06	Chandrakanta Goyal	BJP	46,443	39.84	Upendra P. Doshi	INC	37,613	32.27	8,830
34	Mahim	63.15	Suresh Anant Gambhir	SS	45,601	52.78	Ramanand Laud	INC	22,356	25.88	23,245
35	Dharavi	53.55	Mane Baburao Jotiram	SS	64,607	49.56	Dr. Boudhankar Rajeev Narendra	INC	39,787	30.52	24,820
36	Vandre	55.25	Jayashree Ramdas Nayak	BJP	32,887	36.64	Salim Zakaria	INC	24,621	27.43	8,266
37	Kherwadi	64.75	Madhukar Sarpotdar	SS	54,978	48.93	Kamble Vijay Baburao	INC	35,390	31.50	19,588
38	Vile Parle	60.87	Gurunath Krishna Desai	SS	66,333	55.90	Jitendra Gulab Joshi	INC	37,528	31.62	28,805
39	Amboli	54.69	Shantaram Soma Ambre	SS	72,079	39.71	Makwana Ismail Mohammed	INC	60,386	33.27	11,693
40	Santacruz	60.64	Abhiram Singh	BJP	67,478	46.14	Adv. Nancy Oommachain	INC	37,127	25.39	30,351
41	Andheri	62.28	Sitaram Bhikaji Dalvi Aaba	SS	89,566	45.54	Ramesh Dubey	INC	63,425	32.25	26,141
42	Goregaon	61.03	Nandkumar Kale	SS	57,638	41.98	Sharad Rao	SAP	36,523	26.60	21,115
43	Malad	56.09	Gajanan Kirtikar	SS	147,148	56.18	Ram Pandagle	INC	76,976	29.39	70,172
44	Kandivali	49.56	Madhav Marathe	BJP	91,511	45.12	Chandrakant Gosalia	INC	75,510	37.23	16,001
45	Borivali	53.09	Hemendra Mehta	BJP	1,63,639	64.47	Chintaman Mali	INC	68,810	27.11	94,829
46	Trombay	58.96	Narkar Ratnakar Pandurang	SS	90,450	38.74	Javed Iqbal Khan	INC	54,803	23.47	35,647
47	Chembur	58.28	Hashu Advani	BJP	57,790	42.10	Kunnure Annasaheb Ramchandra	INC	43,172	31.45	14,618
48	Nehrunagar	57.52	Suryakant Mahadik	SS	51,569	42.08	Nawab Malik	SP	37,511	30.61	14,058
49	Kurla	56.19	Chavan Shantaram Sitaram	SS	104,332	46.26	Maske Dayanand Jagannath	INC	50,010	22.17	54,322
50	Ghatkopar	64.84	Prakash Mehta	BJP	81,700	57.43	Bakshi Verandra	INC	51,051	35.88	30,649
51	Bhandup	63.19	Liladhar Dake	SS	93,807	48.05	Patil Manorama Dinanath	INC	71,449	36.60	22,358
52	Mulund	62.33	Kirit Somaiya	BJP	109,143	56.81	R. R. Singh	INC	65,616	34.16	43,527
53	Thane	52.68	Moreshwar Damodar Joshi	SS	122,595	58.01	Bhoir Malati Ramesh	INC	58,492	27.68	64,103
54	Belapur	41.65	Ganesh Naik	SS	2,18,100	56.49	Muzaffar Hussain	INC	1,09,099	28.26	1,09,001
55	Ulhasnagar	41.30	Suresh @ Pappu Budharmal Kalani	IND	90,479	55.84	Mirapuri Teckchand Thanwardas	BJP	35,145	21.69	55,334
56	Ambernath	54.54	Sabir Shaikh	SS	119,283	52.79	Nukul Pundalik Patil	INC	64,797	28.68	54,486
57	Kalyan	57.05	Jagannath Shivram Patil	BJP	162,334	60.89	Jadhav Pralhad Dunda	INC	76,247	28.60	86,087
58	Murbad	74.81	Vishe Digambar Narayan	BJP	58,941	49.75	Gotiram Padu Pawar	INC	51,471	43.44	7,470
59	Wada	67.89	Vishnu Rama Savar	BJP	72,919	47.80	Lahange Babu Kashinath	INC	37,260	24.43	35,659
60	Bhiwandi	52.98	Khan Mohammed Ali	SP	80,444	36.16	Naik Madan Krishna	SS	66,434	29.86	14,010
61	Vasai	59.19	Thakur Appa Urf Hitendra Vishnu	IND	81,463	42.07	Gawhankar Deepak Gajanan	SS	47,888	24.73	33,575
62	Palghar	68.43	Manisha Manohar Nimkar	SS	55,399	46.08	Rahane Jagannath Shidu	INC	35,250	29.32	20,149
63	Dahanu	68.06	Nam Shankar Sakharam	INC	62,813	44.85	Kanbi Kisan Lallubhai	SS	40,458	28.89	22,355
64	Jawhar	71.08	Varatha Ramjee Mahadu	CPI(M)	59,309	45.69	Patil Devidas Pandurang	INC	38,245	29.46	21,064
65	Shahapur	70.05	Daulat Bhika Daroda	SS	52,441	52.48	Mahadu Nago Barora	INC	31,119	31.14	21,322
66	Igatpuri	72.64	Shivram Shankar Zole	INC	33,365	30.98	Gangad Pandoorang Chapu	PWPI	26,289	24.41	7,076
67	Nashik	60.88	Dr. Daulatrao Aher Sonuji	BJP	94,852	48.21	Mane Murlidhar Pandurang	INC	45,717	23.24	49,135
68	Deolali	61.77	Babanrao Gholap	SS	78,339	47.48	Kale Vishawanath Madhavrao	INC	41,420	25.10	36,919
69	Sinnar	78.06	Dighole Tukaram Sakharam	IND	43,600	37.38	Deshmukh Digambar Jayawantrao	SS	36,458	31.25	7,142
70	Niphad	78.57	Kadam Raosaheb Bhaurao	SS	73,885	51.45	Mogal Malojirao Sadashiv	INC	61,622	42.91	12,263
71	Yevla	76.90	Patil Kalyanrao Jayawantrao	SS	52,144	39.29	Bankar Ambadas Balaji	INC	34,669	26.12	17,475
72	Nandgaon	67.46	Deshmukh Rajendra Devidas	SS	35,786	30.15	Dhatrak Jagannath Murlidhar	INC	25,564	21.54	10,222
73	Malegaon	65.41	Nihal Ahmed Maulavi Mohammed Usman	JD	65,621	42.74	Shaikh Rashid Haji Shaikh Shaffi	IND	34,418	22.42	31,203
74	Dabhadi	67.76	Hiray Pushpatai Vyakatarao	INC	40,126	33.48	Hiray Baliram Waman	IND	37,716	31.47	2,410
75	Chandwad	75.82	Kasliwal Jaichand Deepchand	BJP	45,488	39.00	Shirishkumar Vasantrao Kotwal	INC	43,683	37.46	1,805
76	Dindori	74.93	Charoskar Kisan Govind	INC	51,970	39.20	Gumbade Somnath Sakharam	SS	42,682	32.19	9,288
77	Surgana	76.28	Chavan Harischandra Deoram	IND	65,890	54.76	Jiva Pandu Gavit	CPI(M)	37,086	30.82	28,804
78	Kalwan	74.57	Arjun Tulshiram Pawar	BJP	47,896	40.52	Bahiram Popat Motiram	INC	41,311	34.95	6,585
79	Baglan	69.38	Borase Dilip Mangalu	IND	65,004	57.55	Chavan Sanjay Kantilal	INC	25,047	22.18	39,957
80	Sakri	62.77	Govindrao Shivram Chaudhary	BJP	48,182	42.51	Bhoye Reshma Motiram	INC	38,578	34.03	9,604
81	Navapur	72.65	Surupsingh Hirya Naik	INC	69,518	53.36	Mavachi Ratanji Motya	BJP	47,711	36.62	21,807
82	Nandurbar	70.50	Dr.Vijaykumar Krishnarao Gavit	IND	57,694	47.70	Valvi Pratap Rubji	INC	38,116	31.51	19,578
83	Talode	73.24	Padvi Narendrasing Bhagatsing	BJP	40,026	38.98	Padmakar Vijaysing Valvi	IND	23,608	22.99	16,418
84	Akrani	73.55	Kagda Chandya Padvi	IND	27,915	27.05	Pawara Rameshbhai Thikya	INC	23,917	23.18	3,998
85	Shahada	76.13	Annasaheb P. K. Patil	INC	66,305	51.30	Dr. Deshmukh Hemant Bhaskar	IND	46,094	35.66	20,211
86	Shirpur	73.86	Amrishbhai Rasiklal Patel	INC	90,005	68.50	Jamadar Narandrasing Darbarshing	IND	26,852	20.44	63,153
87	Sindkheda	67.60	Rajput Mangalsing Nimji Alias Thansing Jibhau	JD	33,801	34.09	Bhadane Dattatray Waman	INC	26,283	26.51	7,518
88	Kusumba	67.05	Rohidas Chudaman Patil	INC	51,710	48.05	Gajanan Narayan Patil	IND	48,510	45.07	3,200
89	Dhule	64.24	Kadambande Rajwardhan Raghojirao Alias Raju Baba	IND	34,456	25.21	Bapu Shardul	IND	23,755	17.38	10,701
90	Chalisgaon	58.71	Ghode Sahebrao Sitaram	BJP	50,236	44.60	Chavan Vishwas Dagdu	INC	35,343	31.38	14,893
91	Parola	72.99	Patil Bhaskarrao Rajaram	IND	54,095	39.86	Vasantrao Jivanrao More	IND	23,291	17.16	30,804
92	Amalner	72.80	Dr. Abasaheb B S Patil	BJP	35,838	29.65	Patil Amrutrao Wamanrao	INC	34,934	28.90	904
93	Chopda	73.84	Arunlal Gowardhandas Gujrathi	INC	48,359	44.56	Patil Kailas Gorakh	SS	31,955	29.45	16,404
94	Erandol	77.45	Patil Mahendrasinh Dharamsinh	JD	50,391	40.19	Mahajan Ramesh Jagannath	SS	31,405	25.04	18,986
95	Jalgaon	69.94	Sureshkumar Bhikamchand Jain	INC	77,172	48.26	Dr. Arjun Ganpat Bhangale	IND	38,743	24.23	38,429
96	Pachora	74.90	Onkar Narayan Wagh	MVC	30,656	23.44	Deshmukh Anil Ramrao	INC	26,359	20.15	4,297
97	Jamner	76.15	Girish Dattatraya Mahajan	BJP	63,661	52.27	Ishwarlal Shankarlal Jain	INC	43,624	35.82	20,037
98	Bhusawal	69.69	Bhole Dilip Atmaram	SS	56,277	37.90	Bhole Devidas Namdeo	INC	33,104	22.29	23,173
99	Yawal	76.12	Chaudhary Ramesh Vitthal	INC	44,077	40.69	Arun Govinda Mahajan	BJP	40,000	36.92	4,077
100	Raver	79.77	Arun Pandurang Patil	BJP	55,897	44.99	Mahukar Dhanaji Chaudhari	INC	50,714	40.82	5,183
101	Edlabad	80.40	Eknath Khadse	BJP	67,086	51.59	Patil Ravindra Pralhadrao	INC	49,527	38.09	17,559
102	Malkapur	79.52	Chainsukh Madanlal Sancheti	IND	39,492	32.36	More Sahebrao Sadashiv	JD	26,472	21.69	13,020
103	Buldhana	79.03	Shinde Vijay Haribhau	SS	48,842	34.12	Gode Dr. Rajendra Vyankatrao	INC	39,069	27.29	9,773
104	Washim	74.39	Rajguru Purushottam Namdev	BJP	44,928	38.79	Sathe Chandrakant Shripatrao	INC	29,346	25.34	15,582
105	Mangrulpir	76.68	Rathod Gajadhar Ramsing	IND	50,613	40.25	Thakare Subhash Pandharinath	INC	36,202	28.79	14,411
106	Mehkar	81.71	Prataprao Jadhav	SS	72,744	54.85	Saoji Subodh Keshao	INC	39,472	29.76	33,272
107	Khamgaon	79.39	Kokare Nana Nimbaji	BJP	59,778	40.22	Deshmukh Prakashrao Keshaorao	INC	52,095	35.05	7,683
108	Jalamb	83.05	Krushnarao Ganpatrao Ingle	INC	34,438	26.05	Kaple Shrawan Kisanrao	BJP	30,300	22.92	4,138
109	Akot	77.42	Karale Rameshwar Wasudeo	SS	39,104	31.27	Sudhakar Ramkrushna Gangane	INC	30,613	24.48	8,491
110	Borgaon Manju	75.17	Gulabrao Ramrao Gawande	SS	52,716	34.11	Bhande Dashrath Motiram	BBM	43,661	28.25	9,055
111	Murtizapur	73.71	Motiram Lahane	BJP	33,577	29.16	Pawar Makhram Banduji	BBM	32,397	28.13	1,180
112	Balapur	77.42	Gavhankar Narayanrao Haribhau	BJP	36,844	29.40	Dhomane Suryabhan Narayan	BBM	35,582	28.39	1,262
113	Medshi	74.77	Zanak Subhash Ramraoji	INC	27,923	25.08	Dr. Shewale Dnyaneshwar Keshavrao	BBM	26,676	23.96	1,247
116	Karanja	74.63	Babasaheb Dhabekar	IND	39,025	36.00	Prakash Uttamrao Dahake	INC	29,304	27.03	9,721
118	Daryapur	76.20	Prakash Gunvantrao Bharsakale	SS	44,377	37.48	Lendhey Sahebrao Shriram	BBM	32,691	27.61	11,686
119	Melghat	70.64	Patlya Langda Mavaskar	BJP	37,377	29.95	Rajkumar Dayaram Patel	BSP	32,209	25.81	5,168
120	Achalpur	73.85	Vinayak Korde	BJP	46,881	35.94	Dr. Thakre Suresh Bhausaheb	IND	30,567	23.43	16,314
121	Morshi	71.74	Harshwardhan Pratapsinha Deshmukh	INC	50,739	42.56	Maukar Purushottam Gulab	IND	37,359	31.34	13,380
122	Teosa	75.86	Tasare Sharad Motiram	INC	27,062	24.79	Mangale Nanasaheb Ganpat	CPI	17,481	16.01	9,581
123	Walgaon	76.39	Sanjay Raosaheb Band	SS	25,864	23.13	Dr. Anil Warhade	INC	22,089	19.76	3,775
124	Amravati	66.11	Jagdish Motilal Gupta	BJP	71,845	47.82	Mujaffar Ahmad Mo. Yusuf	IND	22,509	14.98	49,336
125	Badnera	69.88	Dhane Dnyaneshwar Mahadeo	SS	35,862	26.97	Vinayak Tukaramji Dudhe	BBM	24,565	18.48	11,297
126	Chandur	78.07	Dhole Pandurang Vithusa	JD	36,863	34.20	Pratap Arunbhau Adsad	BJP	32,484	30.13	4,379
127	Arvi	81.19	Dr. Sharadrao Kale	INC	55,164	39.46	Kale Dilip Narayanrao	IND	44,591	31.90	10,573
128	Pulgaon	76.52	Prabha Anand Rao	INC	43,148	32.18	Deshmukh Sureshrao Bapuraoji	IND	25,597	19.09	17,551
129	Wardha	72.67	Pramod Bhauraoji Shende	INC	47,503	34.71	Jaiswal Suresh Motilalji	IND	24,036	17.56	23,467
130	Hinganghat	78.56	Ashok Shamrao Shinde	SS	43,964	28.41	Sharad Joshi	IND	39,971	25.83	3,993
131	Umred	83.68	Parate Shrawan Govindrao	INC	33,930	24.87	Itkelwqr Vasantrao Balajipant	IND	30,686	22.49	3,244
132	Kamthi	74.12	Radke Deorao Santoshrao	IND	59,738	40.69	Bhoyar Yadavrao Krushnarao	INC	36,937	25.16	22,801
133	Nagpur North	64.37	Badhel Bhola Janglu	BJP	63,488	41.11	Shende Upendra Mangaldas	RPI(K)	44,320	28.70	19,168
134	Nagpur East	68.57	Satish Jhaulal Chaturvedi	INC	69,249	32.88	Dhawade Pravhakar Kashinath	JD	65,919	31.30	3,330
135	Nagpur South	67.18	Ashok Ramchandra Wadibhasme	BJP	49,151	35.45	Dhawad Ashok Shankarrao	INC	36,248	26.14	12,903
136	Nagpur Central	64.14	Anees Ahmed	INC	34,975	35.40	Datke Prabhakar Vithobaji	BJP	26,528	26.85	8,447
137	Nagpur West	67.25	Vinod Gudadhe Patil	BJP	94,698	42.07	Ojha Prabhatai Motilal	INC	52,018	23.11	42,680
138	Kalmeshwar	74.82	Bang Rameshchandra Gopikisan	IND	35,118	24.80	Mate Pandurang Daolat	IND	27,869	19.68	7,249
139	Katol	79.37	Anil Vasantrao Deshmukh	IND	29,807	25.36	Virendra Kashirao Deshmukh	PWPI	25,784	21.93	4,023
140	Savner	83.78	Sunil Chhatrapal Kedar	IND	60,325	42.47	Ranjeet Deshmukh	INC	38,932	27.41	21,393
141	Ramtek	77.51	Gujar Ashokkumar Yeshwant	IND	52,428	36.26	Deshmukh Anandrao Ramji	INC	39,905	27.60	12,523
142	Tumsar	84.52	Madhukar Yashwantrao Kukde	BJP	39,795	34.49	Ishwardayal Mahipal Patale	INC	29,430	25.51	10,365
143	Bhandara	84.30	Aswale Ram Gopal	BJP	58,194	45.98	Vairagade Jayant Vasantrao	INC	33,131	26.18	25,063
144	Adyar	85.56	Sawarbandhe Bhuishchandra Alies Bandubhau Harishchandra	IND	41,644	32.23	Revatkar Rajendra Ramchandra	SS	27,675	21.42	13,969
145	Tirora	81.40	Vaidya Bhajandas Vithoba	BJP	49,597	42.36	Shende Krishnkumar Raghunath	INC	24,663	21.06	24,934
146	Gondiya	77.40	Kuthe Rameshkumar Sampatrao	SS	29,936	24.18	Patel Hariharbhai Manibhai	INC	27,451	22.17	2,485
147	Goregaon	82.40	Bopche Khushal Parasram	INC	46,944	41.59	Thakur Chunnilalbhau Gopal	BJP	41,318	36.61	5,626
148	Amgaon	82.98	Mahadeo Shivankar	BJP	70,402	48.77	Bahekar Bharatbhau Narayanbhau	INC	68,154	47.21	2,248
149	Sakoli	85.82	Dr. Hemkrishna Shamraoji Kapgate	BJP	49,059	37.56	Sewakbhau Nirdhanji Waghaye	INC	39,044	29.89	10,015
150	Lakhandur	87.59	Kapgate Dayaram Maroti	BJP	34,833	23.15	Kute Pramila Premraj	INC	29,159	19.38	5,674
151	Armori	88.36	Madavi Ramkrushna Hariji	SS	38,947	27.85	Anandrao Gangaram Gedam	IND	25,499	18.24	13,448
152	Gadchiroli	86.44	Marotrao Sainuji Kowase	INC	59,732	42.13	Kodap Vilas Shamrao	BJP	38,211	26.95	21,521
153	Sironcha	87.19	Atram Raje Satyavanrao	NVAS	80,780	60.78	Dharamraobaba Bhagwantrao Atram	INC	38,257	28.79	42,523
154	Rajura	84.30	Wamanrao Sadashivrao Chatap	IND	67,690	41.43	Mamulkar Prabhakar Bapurao	INC	48,645	29.77	19,045
155	Chandrapur	73.37	Sudhir Sachchidanand Mungantiwar	BJP	94,379	48.66	Shyam Gopalrao Wankhede	INC	39,915	20.58	54,464
156	Saoli	82.78	Shobha Fadnavis	BJP	71,343	45.57	Gaddamwar Waman Vistari	INC	45,677	29.18	25,666
157	Bramhapuri	86.35	Khanokar Suresh Chintamanrao	JD	42,525	28.27	Pazhode Vasudeorao Rushiji	BJP	39,737	26.42	2,788
158	Chimur	88.36	Dr. Gajbe Rameshkumar Baburaoji	IND	36,433	24.33	Gabhane Ramdasji Lahanuji	BJP	29,090	19.43	7,343
159	Bhadrawati	81.02	Sanjay Wamanrao Deotale	INC	37,689	24.26	Babasaheb Sonbaji Wasade	IND	26,164	16.84	11,525
160	Wani	80.94	Wamanrao Kasawar	INC	42,881	33.02	Vinod Bhaskarrao Mohitkar	SS	29,203	22.49	13,678
161	Ralegaon	78.24	Prof. Vasantrao Chindhuji Purke	INC	38,759	29.95	Jungare Letuji Laxman	IND	26,000	20.09	12,759
162	Kelapur	82.56	Shivajirao Moghe	IND	56,192	45.12	Gedam Deorao Jaituji	INC	38,901	31.23	17,291
163	Yavatmal	69.83	Rajabhau Ganeshrao Thakre	BJP	50,384	36.13	Annasaheb Deshmukh Parwekar	INC	32,637	23.41	17,747
164	Darwha	77.74	Manikrao Govindrao Thakare	INC	44,645	36.09	Pawar Makharam Banduji	BBM	41,677	33.69	2,968
165	Digras	73.19	Munginwar Shrikant Wamanrao	SS	43,392	33.55	Rathod Pratap Lalsing	JD	31,875	24.65	11,517
166	Pusad	77.48	Manohar Rajusing Naik	INC	63,732	46.57	Mukhare Narendra Godhajirao	JD	61,614	45.02	2,118
167	Umarkhed	78.71	Ingale Uttamrao Raghoji	BJP	44,826	33.23	Adv. Anantrao Deosarkar	INC	28,248	20.94	16,578
168	Kinwat	81.12	Digambar Bapuji Pawar Patil	BJP	33,110	27.97	Keram Bhimrao Ramji	IND	21,702	18.33	11,408
169	Hadgaon	79.37	Subhash Bapurao Wankhede	SS	31,478	24.39	Pawar Baburao Yadavrao	IND	24,842	19.25	6,636
170	Nanded	68.84	Khedkar Prakash Murlidharrao	SS	55,972	29.39	Hamid Hussain Sarwari Altaf Hussain	JD	37,680	19.79	18,292
171	Mudkhed	76.96	Sahebrao Baradkar Deshmukh	INC	33,781	25.60	Rajegore Manikrao Laxmanrao	IND	33,330	25.26	451
172	Bhokar	83.17	Dr. Madhavrao Bhujangrao Kinhalkar	INC	36,183	28.66	Deshmukh Balajirao Gopalrao	IND	34,411	27.26	1,772
173	Biloli	76.27	Patil Bhashkarrao Bapurao	INC	61,412	40.20	Sharad Joshi	IND	53,066	34.74	8,346
174	Mukhed	71.83	Avinash Madhukarrao Ghate	INC	39,618	32.31	Patil Gunwant Madhavrao	IND	35,558	29.00	4,060
175	Kandhar	74.63	Chavan Rohidas Khobraji	SS	48,702	36.15	Shankar Anna Dhondge	IND	31,648	23.49	17,054
176	Gangakhed	73.97	Ghandant Sitaram Chimaji	IND	29,610	27.41	Gaikwad Dnyanoba Hari	PWPI	29,134	26.97	476
177	Singnapur	76.66	Suresh Ambadasrao Warpudkar	INC	49,540	42.42	Gawali Uttamrao Abaji	IND	26,415	22.62	23,125
178	Parbhani	66.75	Tukaram Renge Patil	SS	57,212	37.63	Shamim Ahemad Khan Rahim Ahemad Khan	INC	37,858	24.90	19,354
179	Basmath	82.60	Dr. Jaiprakash Shankarlal Mundada	SS	53,518	36.52	Dr. Chavan Prabhakar Eknath	IND	25,453	17.37	28,065
180	Kalamnuri	75.07	Naik Vitthal Champatrao	CPI(M)	45,531	36.49	Adv. Shivaji Gyanbarao Mane	SS	37,144	29.77	8,387
181	Hingoli	75.47	Baliram Kotkar Patil	BJP	36,257	27.13	Patil Sahebrao Narayanrao	INC	33,207	24.85	3,050
182	Jintur	77.20	Ramprasad Kadam Bordikar	INC	49,690	40.89	Pratap Ganpatrao Bangar	JD	41,314	33.99	8,376
183	Pathri	75.34	Haribhau Vitthalrao Lahane	SS	42,598	39.21	Raner Uttamrao Ranganathrao	INC	24,733	22.77	17,865
184	Partur	73.47	A. Kadir A. Wahed Deshmukh	INC	37,912	31.95	Yadav Babanrao Dattatray	BJP	37,790	31.85	122
185	Ambad	69.29	Chothe Shivaji Kundlikrao	SS	49,628	39.04	Kharat Vilasrao Vitthalrao	INC	44,940	35.35	4,688
186	Jalna	74.85	Arjun Khotkar	SS	79,387	53.24	Tope Ankushrao Raosaheb	INC	37,543	25.18	41,844
187	Badnapur	79.69	Chavan Narayanrao Satwaji	SS	44,354	33.70	Pawar Balasaheb Ramrao	IND	26,105	19.83	18,249
188	Bhokardan	79.73	Raosaheb Danve	BJP	63,561	44.71	Janjal Patil Shrirangrao	INC	42,506	29.90	21,055
189	Sillod	74.52	Kale Kisanrao Laxmanrao	BJP	53,005	44.40	Manikrao Palodkar Sandu	INC	39,414	33.01	13,591
190	Kannad	73.34	Raibhan Rambhaji Jadhav	INC	46,639	34.64	Pawar Narayan Bajirao	IND	24,692	18.34	21,947
191	Vaijapur	77.14	Kailas Ramrao Patil	INC	38,177	34.21	Rangnath Murlidhar Wani	IC(S)	32,695	29.30	5,482
192	Gangapur	71.94	Ashok Rajaram	IND	35,544	25.28	Ashatai Shrimantrao	SS	29,037	20.65	6,507
193	Aurangabad West	66.48	Chandrakant Khaire	SS	1,26,700	45.08	Rajendra Darda	INC	72,657	25.85	54,043
194	Aurangabad East	71.88	Haribhau Bagade	BJP	49,496	31.22	Sau. Parvatibai Trimbakrao	INC	31,698	19.99	17,798
195	Paithan	68.92	Sandipanrao Asaram Bhumare	SS	43,802	39.05	Aute Kantrao Vishwanathrao	INC	25,569	22.80	18,233
196	Georai	70.80	Badamrao Pandit	IND	71,362	63.07	Shivajirao Ankushrao	INC	31,095	27.48	40,267
197	Majalgaon	70.33	Jagtap Bajirao Sonaji	IND	29,461	22.24	Patil Radhakrishna	INC	29,073	21.94	388
198	Beed	68.68	Prof. Nawle Suresh Niwrutirao	SS	67,732	48.94	Jaydattaji Kshirsagar	INC	41,041	29.65	26,691
199	Ashti	71.84	Darekar Sahebrao Nathuji	IND	75,788	55.54	Dhonde Bhimrao Anandrao	INC	34,309	25.14	41,479
200	Chausala	64.93	Bhai Tupe Janardhan Tatyaba	PWPI	53,056	45.39	Andhale Keshavrao Yadavrao	BJP	34,400	29.43	18,656
201	Kaij	69.22	Dr. Vimal Mundada	BJP	72,308	55.93	Bhagoji Nivruttirao Satpute	INC	31,978	24.74	40,330
202	Renapur	76.41	Gopinath Pandurang Munde	BJP	78,006	54.58	Kokate Baburao Narsingrao	INC	49,647	34.74	28,359
203	Ahmedpur	84.90	Nagargoje Bhagwanrao Kerbaji	BJP	60,622	50.89	Jadhav Balasaheb Kishan Rao	INC	41,200	34.58	19,422
204	Udgir	83.20	Prof. Patwari Manohar Digamberrao	INC	34,333	25.94	Kendre Govind Dnyanoba	JD	30,996	23.42	3,337
205	Her	80.39	Gundile Ram Sambhajirao	BJP	41,499	39.11	Kamble Trimbak Mukundrao	INC	16,528	15.58	24,971
206	Latur	82.44	Shivajirao Patil Kavhekar	JD	1,12,901	56.37	Vilasrao Dagadojirao Deshmukh	INC	79,077	39.48	33,824
207	Kalamb	70.54	Narhire Kalpana Ramesh	SS	58,171	50.02	Trimbake Ramling Gundiba	INC	32,360	27.82	25,811
208	Paranda	71.86	Dnyaneshwar Raosaheb Patil	SS	39,424	31.71	Vijaysinh Amarsinh Thorat	IND	33,682	27.09	5,742
209	Osmanabad	75.15	Dr. Padamsinh Bajirao Patil	INC	62,555	47.89	Kale Vasantrao Shankarrao	IND	24,616	18.84	37,939
210	Ausa	83.74	Jadhav Kishanrao Sampatrao	INC	55,603	45.75	Jadhav Suryabhan Narayanrao	SS	28,084	23.11	27,519
211	Nilanga	83.81	Manikrao Bhimrao Jadhav	JD	75,041	56.08	Shivajirao Patil Nilangekar	INC	39,047	29.18	35,994
212	Omerga	78.53	Ravindra Gaikwad	SS	68,343	51.55	Basavraj Madhavrao Patil	INC	56,410	42.55	11,933
213	Tuljapur	75.34	Khaple Manikrao Bhimrao	PWPI	62,437	57.36	Madhukarao Deorao Chavan	INC	35,924	33.00	26,513
214	Akkalkot	78.92	Tanawade Babasaheb Sharannappa	BJP	35,442	34.35	Tinwala M. Shafi Gulabso	INC	30,802	29.85	4,640
215	Solapur South	79.15	Anandrao Narayan Devkate	INC	41,530	36.56	Birajdar Bhimrao Pandit	IND	34,494	30.37	7,036
216	Solapur City South	71.64	Adam Narsayya Narayan	CPI(M)	29,589	26.03	Birajdar Patil Shivsharan Hanmantappa	SS	27,038	23.79	2,551
217	Solapur City North	75.08	Lingaraj Valyal	BJP	36,077	45.79	Abdulpurkar Aralappa Gangappa	INC	20,883	26.51	15,194
218	North Sholapur	65.09	Khandare Uttamprakash Baburao	SS	74,951	43.69	Kamalapure Sundararaj Narasappa	INC	62,455	36.40	12,496
219	Mangalwedha	73.36	Dhobale Laxman Kondiba	INC	61,087	51.62	Borade Vimaltai Dnyandeo	IND	37,892	32.02	23,195
220	Mohol	83.17	Patil Rajan Baburao	INC	54,320	48.13	Nimbalkar Chandrakant Dattaji	PWPI	38,398	34.02	15,922
221	Barshi	81.83	Dilip Gangadhar Sopal	IND	42,545	36.43	Prabhavati Shankarrao Zadbuke	INC	37,061	31.73	5,484
222	Madha	81.67	Babanrao Vitthalrao Shinde	IND	48,896	37.47	Pandurang Ganapat Patil	INC	28,586	21.91	20,310
223	Pandharpur	85.85	Sudhakar Ramchandra Paricharak	INC	80,084	47.38	Patil Rajaram Audumbar	IND	73,914	43.73	6,170
224	Sangola	82.56	Shahajibapu Rajaram Patil	INC	73,910	48.26	Ganpatrao Abasaheb Deshmukh	PWPI	73,718	48.13	192
225	Malshiras	84.82	Vijaysinh Mohite–Patil	INC	84,709	54.90	Patil Subhash Balasaheb	BJP	65,247	42.29	19,462
226	Karmala	83.19	Bagal Digambar Murlidhar	IND	45,423	43.65	Jaywantrao Namdeorao Jagtap	INC	41,485	39.87	3,938
227	Karjat	73.11	Lokhande Sadashiv Kisan	BJP	64,269	54.58	Premanand Dadasaheb Rupwate	INC	38,834	32.98	25,435
228	Shrigonda	81.04	Pachpute Babanrao Bhikaji	INC	64,957	43.26	Bhos Babasaheb Sahadu	IND	46,433	30.93	18,524
229	Ahmednagar South	67.82	Anil Rathod	SS	61,289	47.37	Kalamkar Dadabhau Dasarth Rao	INC	35,461	27.41	25,828
230	Ahmednagar North	74.17	Shivaji Bhanudas Kardile	IND	62,552	41.33	Kute Vijayatai Chandrakant	INC	35,838	23.68	26,714
231	Pathardi	63.12	Rajeev Rajale	INC	40,846	38.33	Andhale Vikramrao Govindrao	BJP	36,576	34.33	4,270
232	Shegaon	75.90	Pandurang Gamaji Abhang	INC	51,297	40.21	Tukaram Gangadhar Gadakh	IND	51,285	40.21	12
233	Shrirampur	76.39	Murkute Bhanudas Kashinath	INC	54,522	51.63	Kamble Anil Shamrao	IND	36,256	34.33	18,266
234	Shirdi	76.73	Radhakrishna Vikhe Patil	INC	65,516	60.20	Gadekar Dhanjay Shravan	SS	35,055	32.21	30,461
235	Kopargaon	77.14	Shankarrao Genuji Kolhe	INC	53,999	48.70	Sonawane Bhagatsing Dayaram Alias Raosaheb	SS	47,157	42.53	6,842
236	Rahuri	80.65	Prasadrao Baburao Tanpure	INC	59,126	45.64	Dhumal Ramdas Vishwanath	IND	54,103	41.76	5,023
237	Parner	81.53	Zaware Patil Vasantrao Krushnarao	INC	28,886	25.75	Nandkumar Bhausaheb Zaware	IND	22,324	19.90	6,562
238	Sangamner	78.68	Vijay Bhausaheb Thorat	INC	73,611	50.97	Gulave Bapusaheb Namdeo	IND	58,957	40.82	14,654
239	Nagar–Akola	76.78	Madhukar Pichad	INC	77,758	52.73	Ashok Yashwant Bhangare	IND	44,726	30.33	33,032
240	Junnar	84.28	Balasaheb Savalerambuva Dangat	SS	59,552	43.18	Vallabh Benke	INC	42,545	30.85	17,007
241	Ambegaon	85.96	Dilip Walse Patil	INC	57,014	51.02	Kisanrao B. Bankhele	JD	50,558	45.24	6,456
242	Khed Alandi	79.43	Narayanrao Baburao Pawar	INC	60,436	44.61	Babanrao Laxman Daware	IND	56,597	41.78	3,839
243	Maval	78.70	Dhore Ruplekha Khanderao	BJP	71,452	53.07	Bafna Madanlal Harakchand	INC	50,900	37.81	20,552
244	Mulshi	67.83	Ashok Namdeorao Mohol	INC	73,559	46.11	Nana Balkawade	SS	63,625	39.88	9,934
245	Haveli	64.37	Gajanan Dharmshi Babar	SS	110,104	35.26	Ramkrishna More	INC	102,356	32.78	7,748
246	Bopodi	68.79	Rambhau Genba Moze	INC	51,393	42.25	Gaikwad Jaidev Marutrao	BBM	30,011	24.67	21,382
247	Shivajinagar	68.06	Shashikant Sutar	SS	102,409	51.61	Adv. Vandana Chavan	INC	78,119	39.37	24,290
248	Parvati	65.93	Dilip Kamble	BJP	82,792	41.26	Sharad Ranpise	INC	60,087	29.95	22,705
249	Kasba Peth	74.57	Girish Bapat	BJP	53,043	58.31	Dr. Satish Desai	INC	32,283	35.49	20,760
250	Bhavani Peth	67.66	Deepak Natharam Paigude	SS	48,063	41.90	Dhere Prakash Keshavrao	INC	34,818	30.35	13,245
251	Pune Cantonment	66.00	Suryakant Lonkar	SS	78,000	44.12	Balasaheb Alias Chandrakant Shivarkar	INC	75,580	42.75	2,420
252	Shirur	78.28	Gawade Popatrao Hariba	INC	36,897	30.78	Pacharne Baburao Kashinath	IND	36,219	30.21	678
253	Daund	75.34	Subhash Baburao Kul	INC	121,914	76.43	Divekar Tanaji Sambhaji	BJP	29,244	18.33	92,670
254	Indapur	85.41	Harshvardhan Shahajirao Patil	IND	59,125	39.10	Patil Ganpatrao Sitaram	INC	47,949	31.71	11,176
255	Baramati	81.24	Ajit Pawar	INC	91,493	71.91	Kakade Ratanrao Bhagwanrao	IND	14,158	11.13	77,335
256	Purandar	77.59	Dada Jadhav	JD	90,321	64.02	Chandukaka Jagtap	INC	46,935	33.27	43,386
257	Bhor	83.40	Anantrao Thopate	INC	57,055	53.19	Kashinath Khutwad	IND	40,023	37.31	17,032
258	Phaltan	80.23	Ramraje Naik Nimbalkar	IND	84,816	63.93	Kadam Suryajirao Shankarrao Alais Chimanrao	INC	42,367	31.94	42,449
259	Man	74.00	Waghmare Dhondiram Ganapati	IND	66,765	53.44	Sonavane Vishnu Tatoba	INC	42,844	34.29	23,921
260	Khatav	79.37	Gudage Mohanrao Pandurang	IND	52,514	42.55	Bagal Aarunrao Shivram	INC	51,919	42.07	595
261	Koregaon	79.13	Jagtap Shankarrao Chimaji	INC	59,793	50.01	Dr. Shalini Patil	IND	53,807	45.00	5,986
262	Wai	82.17	Madanrao Prataprao Pisal	IND	51,761	45.36	Madan Prataprao Bhosale	INC	41,103	36.02	10,658
263	Jaoli	71.22	Sapkal Sadashiv Pandurang	SS	50,500	39.35	Kadam Genuji Govind	INC	45,600	35.54	4,900
264	Satara	72.66	Abhaysinh Shahumaharaj Bhosale	INC	83,053	62.17	Ghorpade Bhimrao Shamrao	IND	30,485	22.82	52,568
265	Patan	77.97	Vikramsinh Ranjitsinh Patankar	INC	59,399	49.85	Shambhuraj Shivajirao Desai	IND	58,663	49.23	736
266	Karad North	76.75	Pandurang Dadasaheb Patil	IND	67,467	48.73	Patil Anandrao Raghoji	INC	52,779	38.12	14,688
267	Karad South	77.42	Vilasrao Balkrishna Patil	INC	69,386	53.93	Mohite Indrajit Yeshwantrao	IND	48,014	37.32	21,372
268	Shirala	84.25	Shivajirao Yashwantrao Naik	IND	72,856	54.14	Charapale Shankarrao Nana	INC	55,099	40.94	17,757
269	Walva	79.84	Jayant Rajaram Patil	INC	94,605	65.45	Patil Ashok Shamarao	BJP	31,394	21.72	63,211
270	Bhilwadi Wangi	86.42	Deshmukh Sampatrao Vyankatrao	IND	71,296	50.44	Dr. Patangrao Shripatrao Kadam	INC	64,031	45.30	7,265
271	Sangli	78.47	Sambhaji Pawar	JD	51,283	36.55	Prakashbapu Vasantdada Patil	INC	39,516	28.16	11,767
272	Miraj	76.74	Patil Sharad Ramgonda	JD	68,432	49.81	Gaikwad Maniktai Anandrao	INC	23,817	17.34	44,615
273	Tasgaon	84.72	Raosaheb Ramrao Patil	INC	79,505	66.25	Dinkarrao (Aba) Krishnaji Patil	IND	29,660	24.72	49,845
274	Khanapur Atpadi	82.24	Deshmukh Rajendra @ Nathajirao Rastumrao	IND	73,998	54.06	Babar Anilrao Kalegerao	INC	53,708	39.24	20,290
275	Kavathe Mahankal	85.35	Ajitrao Shankarrao Ghorpade	IND	72,619	52.17	Shivajirao Krishnaji Shendge	INC	60,729	43.63	11,890
276	Jat	69.97	Kamble Madhukar Shankar	IND	54,294	48.76	Sanmadikar Umaji Dhanapa	INC	38,135	34.25	16,159
277	Shirol	80.99	Dr. Ratnappa Bharamappa Kumbhar	INC	85,533	52.20	Shamrao Patil (Yadravkar) Alias Shamgonda Babgonda Patil	IND	59,365	36.23	26,168
278	Ichalkaranji	80.73	Prakashanna Awade	INC	82,086	46.63	K. L. Malabade	CPI(M)	79,643	45.24	2,443
279	Vadgaon	73.38	Avale Jayawant Gangaram	INC	43,951	31.28	Dabade Akaram Shivram	SS	40,866	29.09	3,085
280	Shahuwadi	80.29	Gaikwad Sanjaysing Jayasingrao	IND	58,640	47.23	Babasaheb Yeshwantrao Patil Sarudkar	INC	46,192	37.21	12,448
281	Panhala	78.78	Patil Yeshwant Eknath	INC	46,162	41.61	Kore Nipun Vilasrao	IND	30,851	27.81	15,311
282	Sangrul	80.67	Sampatbapu Shamrao Pawarpatil	PWPI	63,236	46.10	P. N. Patil (Sadolikar)	INC	59,934	43.70	3,302
283	Radhanagari	79.87	Bhoite Namdevrao Shankar	IND	43,173	31.72	Desai Bajarang Anandrao	IND	40,158	29.51	3,015
284	Kolhapur	70.51	Suresh Balwant Salokhe	SS	51,510	39.95	Prof. Ingavale Vishnupant Anandrao	PWPI	37,209	28.86	14,301
285	Karvir	75.60	Digvijay Bhauso Khanvilkar	INC	80,033	49.42	Mahadik Mahadeorao Ramchandra	IND	48,501	29.95	31,532
286	Kagal	86.62	Sadashivrao Dadoba Mandlik	INC	71,127	53.01	Ghatage Vikramsinh Jayasingrao	IND	60,204	44.87	10,923
287	Gadhinglaj	84.19	Desai Krishnarao Rakhamajirao	INC	54,761	42.56	Shinde Shripatrao Dinkarrao	JD	43,384	33.72	11,377
288	Chandgad	83.73	Bharamu Subarao Patil	IND	58,347	45.68	Narsingrao Gurunath Patil	INC	53,264	41.70	5,083
