= Pathardi Assembly constituency =

Constituency of the Maharashtra legislative assembly in India

Pathardi
- Former constituency for the Maharashtra Legislative Assembly

Constituency details
- Country: India
- Region: Western India
- State: Maharashtra
- Established: 1952
- Abolished: 2008
- Total electors: 204,822

Pathardi Assembly constituency was an assembly constituency in the India state of Maharashtra.

== Members of the Legislative Assembly ==
| Election | Member | Party |
|---|---|---|
| 1952 | Nirhali Madhav Maruti | Indian National Congress |
| 1957 | Avhad Narayan Ganapat | Independent politician |
| 1962 | Avhad Narayan Ganapat | Communist Party of India |
| 1967 | T. S. Bharade | Indian National Congress |
| 1972 | Mhaske Ganapat Rajaram | Independent politician |
| 1978 | Babanrao Dhakne | Janata Party |
| 1980 | Babanrao Dhakne | Janata Party |
| 1985 | Babanrao Dhakne | Janata Party |
| 1990 | Rajeev Rajale | Indian National Congress |
| 1995 | Rajeev Rajale | Indian National Congress |
| 1999 | Bade Dagadu Paraji | Bharatiya Janata Party |
| 2004 | Rajeev Rajale | Indian National Congress |

== Election results ==
=== Assembly Election 2004 ===
2004 Maharashtra Legislative Assembly election : Pathardi
| Party | Candidate | Votes | % | ±% |
|---|---|---|---|---|
| INC | Rajeev Rajale | 66,846 | 44.27% | ▲17.06 |
| BJP | Dhakane Partap Babanrao | 60,845 | 40.30% | ▲12.34 |
| Independent | Kashinath Radhakisan Lawande | 8,996 | 5.96% | New |
| Independent | Ramkrishna Vishwanath Bade | 4,579 | 3.03% | New |
| BSP | Jadhav Narayan Shankar | 2,589 | 1.71% | New |
| Independent | Sayyad Yunus Ahamad | 2,124 | 1.41% | New |
| RSPS | Shivaji Jagannath Chormale | 1,757 | 1.16% | New |
| Independent | Raosaheb Mohan Pakhare | 1,324 | 0.88% | New |
| Margin of victory | | 6,001 | 3.97% | ▲3.22 |
| Turnout | | 151,041 | 73.74% | ▲2.67 |
| Total valid votes | | 150,990 | | |
| Registered electors | | 204,822 | | ▲17.94 |
| INC gain from BJP | | Swing | ▲16.31 | |

=== Assembly Election 1999 ===
1999 Maharashtra Legislative Assembly election : Pathardi
| Party | Candidate | Votes | % | ±% |
|---|---|---|---|---|
| BJP | Bade Dagadu Paraji | 31,483 | 27.96% | ▼6.37 |
| INC | Rajeev Rajale | 30,639 | 27.21% | ▼11.12 |
| NCP | Babanrao Dadaba Dhakane | 27,218 | 24.17% | New |
| Independent | Mhaske Chandrakant Ganpatrao | 20,692 | 18.37% | New |
| Independent | Garje Dnyandeo Kisan | 1,296 | 1.15% | New |
| ABS | Rajendra Bajirao Kamble | 703 | 0.62% | New |
| Margin of victory | | 844 | 0.75% | ▼3.26 |
| Turnout | | 123,424 | 71.07% | ▲7.95 |
| Total valid votes | | 112,611 | | |
| Registered electors | | 173,659 | | ▼0.70 |
| BJP gain from INC | | Swing | ▼10.37 | |

=== Assembly Election 1995 ===
1995 Maharashtra Legislative Assembly election : Pathardi
| Party | Candidate | Votes | % | ±% |
|---|---|---|---|---|
| INC | Rajeev Rajale | 40,846 | 38.33% | ▼10.92 |
| BJP | Andhale Vikramrao Govindrao | 36,576 | 34.33% | New |
| Independent | Kakade Vijayrao Jagannathrao | 12,115 | 11.37% | New |
| Independent | Rajale Bhausaheb Babasaheb | 6,610 | 6.20% | New |
| JD | Bhapse Pramod Baburao | 2,892 | 2.71% | ▼41.94 |
| Independent | Barfe Suresh Ananda | 1,818 | 1.71% | New |
| Independent | Tupe Ashok Bhivshen | 1,650 | 1.55% | New |
| BBM | Jadhav Ashok Genuji | 1,386 | 1.30% | New |
| Margin of victory | | 4,270 | 4.01% | ▼0.59 |
| Turnout | | 110,384 | 63.12% | ▲2.83 |
| Total valid votes | | 106,555 | | |
| Registered electors | | 174,876 | | ▲9.63 |
| INC hold | | Swing | ▼10.92 | |

=== Assembly Election 1990 ===
1990 Maharashtra Legislative Assembly election : Pathardi
| Party | Candidate | Votes | % | ±% |
|---|---|---|---|---|
| INC | Rajeev Rajale | 46,178 | 49.25% | ▲5.95 |
| JD | Bhapse Baburao Yeshwantrao | 41,864 | 44.65% | New |
| SS | Golhar Ramnath Gahininath | 3,546 | 3.78% | New |
| Doordarshi Party | Bivade Dilip Raghunath | 687 | 0.73% | New |
| Independent | Kate Sudhakar Petras | 666 | 0.71% | New |
| Margin of victory | | 4,314 | 4.60% | ▼4.67 |
| Turnout | | 96,175 | 60.29% | ▼3.58 |
| Total valid votes | | 93,758 | | |
| Registered electors | | 159,513 | | ▲18.66 |
| INC gain from JP | | Swing | ▼3.32 | |

=== Assembly Election 1985 ===
1985 Maharashtra Legislative Assembly election : Pathardi
| Party | Candidate | Votes | % | ±% |
|---|---|---|---|---|
| JP | Babanrao Dhakne | 43,977 | 52.57% | New |
| INC | Appasaheb Dadaba Rajale | 36,223 | 43.30% | New |
| Independent | Bharat Motiram Pardeshi | 1,661 | 1.99% | New |
| Independent | Pathan Babulal Bapuji | 1,435 | 1.72% | New |
| Margin of victory | | 7,754 | 9.27% | ▼27.67 |
| Turnout | | 85,867 | 63.87% | ▲7.05 |
| Total valid votes | | 83,661 | | |
| Registered electors | | 134,432 | | ▲10.56 |
| JP gain from JP | | Swing | ▼6.90 | |

=== Assembly Election 1980 ===
1980 Maharashtra Legislative Assembly election : Pathardi
| Party | Candidate | Votes | % | ±% |
|---|---|---|---|---|
| JP | Babanrao Dhakne | 39,712 | 59.47% | New |
| Independent | Baburao Bhapse | 15,041 | 22.52% | New |
| Independent | Jadhav Sonrao Khedkar | 7,701 | 11.53% | New |
| Independent | Trimbak Anna Chede | 1,757 | 2.63% | New |
| Independent | Babulal Bapuji Pathan | 1,368 | 2.05% | New |
| INC(U) | Kamlakar Pandurang Baravkar | 1,201 | 1.80% | New |
| Margin of victory | | 24,671 | 36.94% | ▲21.66 |
| Turnout | | 69,090 | 56.82% | ▼7.02 |
| Total valid votes | | 66,780 | | |
| Registered electors | | 121,587 | | ▲10.19 |
| JP gain from JP | | Swing | ▲4.92 | |

=== Assembly Election 1978 ===
1978 Maharashtra Legislative Assembly election : Pathardi
| Party | Candidate | Votes | % | ±% |
|---|---|---|---|---|
| JP | Babanrao Dhakne | 37,134 | 54.55% | New |
| INC | Khedkar Yadavrao Sonarao | 26,735 | 39.28% | ▼0.87 |
| INC(I) | Kate Bhagwanrao Ramrao | 3,562 | 5.23% | New |
| Independent | Pathan Babulal Papuji | 639 | 0.94% | New |
| Margin of victory | | 10,399 | 15.28% | ▼0.02 |
| Turnout | | 70,443 | 63.84% | ▲8.73 |
| Total valid votes | | 68,070 | | |
| Registered electors | | 110,340 | | ▲1.99 |
| JP gain from Independent | | Swing | ▼0.90 | |

=== Assembly Election 1972 ===
1972 Maharashtra Legislative Assembly election : Pathardi
| Party | Candidate | Votes | % | ±% |
|---|---|---|---|---|
| Independent | Mhaske Ganapat Rajaram | 31,937 | 55.45% | New |
| INC | Manikbai Garje | 23,126 | 40.15% | ▼10.42 |
| Independent | Mohitevishwasrao Baburao | 2,534 | 4.40% | New |
| Margin of victory | | 8,811 | 15.30% | ▲12.09 |
| Turnout | | 59,621 | 55.11% | ▼8.19 |
| Total valid votes | | 57,597 | | |
| Registered electors | | 108,184 | | ▲16.80 |
| Independent gain from INC | | Swing | ▲4.88 | |

=== Assembly Election 1967 ===
1967 Maharashtra Legislative Assembly election : Pathardi
| Party | Candidate | Votes | % | ±% |
|---|---|---|---|---|
| INC | T. S. Bharade | 28,316 | 50.57% | ▲4.86 |
| CPI | J. K. Kakade | 26,520 | 47.36% | ▼6.93 |
| Independent | V. B. Mohite | 1,158 | 2.07% | New |
| Margin of victory | | 1,796 | 3.21% | ▼5.37 |
| Turnout | | 58,625 | 63.30% | ▲6.77 |
| Total valid votes | | 55,994 | | |
| Registered electors | | 92,620 | | ▲35.67 |
| INC gain from CPI | | Swing | ▼3.72 | |

=== Assembly Election 1962 ===
1962 Maharashtra Legislative Assembly election : Pathardi
| Party | Candidate | Votes | % | ±% |
|---|---|---|---|---|
| CPI | Narayan Ganpat Avhad | 19,723 | 54.29% | New |
| INC | Trimbak Lahanu Garje | 16,606 | 45.71% | ▲15.95 |
| Margin of victory | | 3,117 | 8.58% | ▼23.68 |
| Turnout | | 38,592 | 56.53% | ▲6.09 |
| Total valid votes | | 36,329 | | |
| Registered electors | | 68,271 | | ▲8.78 |
| CPI gain from Independent | | Swing | ▼7.73 | |

=== Assembly Election 1957 ===
1957 Bombay State Legislative Assembly election : Pathardi
| Party | Candidate | Votes | % | ±% |
|---|---|---|---|---|
| Independent | Avhad Narayan Ganapat | 19,635 | 62.02% | New |
| INC | Gandhi Chandanmal Navalmal | 9,422 | 29.76% | ▼27.08 |
| Independent | Patil Bajirao Gangaram | 2,601 | 8.22% | New |
| Margin of victory | | 10,213 | 32.26% | ▲18.59 |
| Turnout | | 31,658 | 50.44% | ▲5.75 |
| Total valid votes | | 31,658 | | |
| Registered electors | | 62,763 | | ▲15.76 |
| Independent gain from INC | | Swing | ▲5.18 | |

=== Assembly Election 1952 ===
1952 Bombay State Legislative Assembly election : Pathardi
| Party | Candidate | Votes | % | ±% |
|---|---|---|---|---|
| INC | Nirhali Madhav Maruti | 13,771 | 56.84% | New |
| CPI | Avad Narayan Ganpat | 10,458 | 43.16% | New |
| Margin of victory | | 3,313 | 13.67% | |
| Turnout | | 24,229 | 44.69% | |
| Total valid votes | | 24,229 | | |
| Registered electors | | 54,219 | | |
| INC win (new seat) | | | | |
