= Jalamb Assembly constituency =

Constituency of the Maharashtra legislative assembly in India

Coordinates: 20.81°N 76.58°E

Jalamb
- Former constituency for the Maharashtra Legislative Assembly

Constituency details
- Country: India
- Region: Western India
- State: Maharashtra
- District: Buldhana
- Established: 1957
- Abolished: 1978

Jalamb is one of the constituencies of Maharashtra Vidhan Sabha in the Buldhana district during 1957-1962 and 1978-to-2004 State elections. It was established in 1957 as then Bombay State Vidhan Sabha (Assembly) constituency located in Buldhana district. For these 1957 and 1962 elections, adjoining Shegaon Assembly constituency was dissolved.

It was dissolved for 1967 and 72 elections to Maharashtra, and adjoining Shegaon Assembly constituency was re-established.

Jalamb constituency was re-established for second time for the state election from 1978 and continue to exist till 2004 elections. It has been dissolved for second time from 2009 elections, as Jalgaon (Jamod) Assembly constituency was re-established after 1951 elections.

== Members of the Legislative Assembly ==
Year	Member	Party
1957	Vitthal Sadashiv	Indian National Congress
1962	Kashirao Patil	Peasants and Workers Party
1967-78 : Constituency did not exist
1978	Tulshiram Dhokane	Peasants and Workers Party
1980	Shraddha Tapre	Indian National Congress (I)
1985	Shraddha Tapre	Indian National Congress
1990	Krushnarao Ingle	Shiv Sena
1995	Krushnarao Ingle	Indian National Congress
1999	Krushnarao Ingle	Indian National Congress
2004	Sanjay Kute	Bharatiya Janata Party
2008 onwards : Constituency defunct

== Election results ==
=== Assembly Election 2004 ===
2004 Maharashtra Legislative Assembly election : Jalamb
Party	Candidate	Votes	%	±%
BJP	Dr. Sanjay Kute	50,267	35.09%	▼0.35
INC	Krushnarao Ganpatrao Ingle	43,466	30.34%	▼10.17
BBM	Sk.Majid Sa.Haidar	21,557	15.05%	New
PWPI	Kaple Shrawan Kisanrao	15,794	11.03%	▲3.19
BSP	Bhojane Bhaurao Gonduji	4,263	2.98%	New
Independent	Jabiullashah Rabbanishah	3,394	2.37%	New
Independent	Amanullkhan Bhikankhan	1,923	1.34%	New
Margin of victory		6,801	4.75%	▼0.33
Turnout		143,281	73.17%	▲6.08
Total valid votes		143,254		
Registered electors		195,821		▲16.57
BJP gain from INC		Swing	▼5.42	

=== Assembly Election 1999 ===
1999 Maharashtra Legislative Assembly election : Jalamb
Party	Candidate	Votes	%	±%
INC	Krushnarao Ganpatrao Ingle	42,773	40.51%	▲14.46
BJP	Varukar Vasant Narayan	37,417	35.44%	▲12.52
NCP	Wankhade Prakash Suryabhan	15,316	14.51%	New
PWPI	Marode Tejrao Rambhau	8,277	7.84%	▼13.92
Independent	Gandhi Asaram Harikisan	1,217	1.15%	New
Margin of victory		5,356	5.07%	▲1.94
Turnout		112,698	67.09%	▼13.91
Total valid votes		105,578		
Registered electors		167,987		▲2.94
INC hold		Swing	▲14.46	

=== Assembly Election 1995 ===
1995 Maharashtra Legislative Assembly election : Jalamb
Party	Candidate	Votes	%	±%
INC	Krushnarao Ganpatrao Ingle	34,438	26.05%	▼1.62
BJP	Kaple Shrawan Kisanrao	30,300	22.92%	New
PWPI	Gawande Vasanti Shrikant	28,762	21.76%	▼10.18
BBM	Dhokane Ravindra Tulshiram	14,687	11.11%	New
Independent	Rathi Onkardas Jainarayan	13,451	10.18%	New
Independent	Khawale Motiram Gangaram	3,171	2.40%	New
Independent	Rahane Madhukar Mahadeo	1,959	1.48%	New
Margin of victory		4,138	3.13%	▼2.28
Turnout		135,528	83.05%	▲7.24
Total valid votes		132,176		
Registered electors		163,193		▲13.10
INC gain from SS		Swing	▼11.29	

=== Assembly Election 1990 ===
1990 Maharashtra Legislative Assembly election : Jalamb
Party	Candidate	Votes	%	±%
SS	Krushnarao Ganpatrao Ingle	39,746	37.35%	New
PWPI	Gawande Vasanti Shrikant	33,988	31.94%	▼8.87
INC	Tapre Shraddhatai Prabhakar	29,452	27.68%	▼14.15
Independent	Khalil Ahemedkha Dautkha	1,172	1.10%	New
Independent	Ghatole Gajanan Laxman	665	0.62%	New
Margin of victory		5,758	5.41%	▲4.39
Turnout		108,442	75.16%	▲7.24
Total valid votes		106,416		
Registered electors		144,285		▲19.70
SS gain from INC		Swing	▼4.48	

=== Assembly Election 1985 ===
1985 Maharashtra Legislative Assembly election : Jalamb
Party	Candidate	Votes	%	±%
INC	Shradha Prabhakar Tapare	33,537	41.83%	New
PWPI	Deshmukh Gajananrao Shankarrao	32,719	40.81%	▲12.77
Independent	Rajane Ramkrushna Tukaram	10,311	12.86%	New
Independent	Dugane Shrikrushna Diyandeo	2,268	2.83%	New
Independent	Umarkar Vitthalrao Sadashiv	548	0.68%	New
Margin of victory		818	1.02%	▼11.85
Turnout		81,767	67.83%	▲4.07
Total valid votes		80,178		
Registered electors		120,540		▲9.96
INC gain from INC(I)		Swing	▲0.92	

=== Assembly Election 1980 ===
1980 Maharashtra Legislative Assembly election : Jalamb
Party	Candidate	Votes	%	±%
INC(I)	Shradha Prabhakar Tapare	28,008	40.91%	▲6.50
PWPI	Manikrao Deorao Patil	19,197	28.04%	▼8.30
INC(U)	Vithalrao Sadashiv Umarkar	15,040	21.97%	New
BJP	Deshmukh Panjabrao Ajabrao	5,178	7.56%	New
Independent	Khirodkar Shankarrao Ukardaji	1,036	1.51%	New
Margin of victory		8,811	12.87%	▲10.94
Turnout		70,320	64.15%	▼7.67
Total valid votes		68,459		
Registered electors		109,624		▲6.51
INC(I) gain from PWPI		Swing	▲4.57	

=== Assembly Election 1978 ===
1978 Maharashtra Legislative Assembly election : Jalamb
Party	Candidate	Votes	%	±%
PWPI	Dhokane Tulshiram Pandhari	26,228	36.34%	▼10.62
INC(I)	Tapre Bhaurao Namdeorao	24,835	34.41%	New
Independent	Umarkar Vitthalrao Sadashiv	11,049	15.31%	New
RPI	Ghumre Pandurang Fattuji	7,965	11.04%	New
Independent	Bodale Baban Gotu	1,765	2.45%	New
Margin of victory		1,393	1.93%	▼4.47
Turnout		74,577	72.46%	▲5.88
Total valid votes		72,165		
Registered electors		102,921		▲23.18
PWPI hold		Swing	▼10.62	

=== Assembly Election 1962 ===
1962 Maharashtra Legislative Assembly election : Jalamb
Party	Candidate	Votes	%	±%
PWPI	Kashirao Raibhan Patil	25,207	46.97%	▲0.56
INC	Tulsiram Pandhari Dhokne	21,774	40.57%	▼9.34
ABJS	Kashinath Shamrao Kate	2,409	4.49%	New
Independent	Samrat Ganpat Gavande	1,571	2.93%	New
Independent	Waman Shamaji Hage	1,145	2.13%	New
Independent	Gulabrao Kisan Thakre	1,077	2.01%	New
Independent	Badrinarayan Hiralal	487	0.91%	New
Margin of victory		3,433	6.40%	▲2.89
Turnout		58,810	70.39%	▼9.95
Total valid votes		53,670		
Registered electors		83,554		▲11.58
PWPI gain from INC		Swing	▼2.95	

=== Assembly Election 1957 ===
1957 Bombay State Legislative Assembly election : Jalamb
Party	Candidate	Votes	%	±%
INC	Vithal Sadashio	27,728	49.91%	New
PWPI	Patil Kashirao Raibhan	25,781	46.41%	New
Independent	Jawanjale Bhagwan Manaji	2,045	3.68%	New
Margin of victory		1,947	3.50%	
Turnout		55,554	74.19%	
Total valid votes		55,554		
Registered electors		74,885		
INC win (new seat)				

== See also ==
- Shegaon
- Sangrampur, India
- Jalgaon (Jamod)
- Shegaon Assembly constituency
