= Monika Rajiv Rajale =

Indian politician

Member of the Maharashtra Legislative Assembly
- Incumbent
- Assumed office 2014
- Preceded by: Chandrashekhar Ghule Patil
- Constituency: Shevgaon

Personal details
- Party: Bharatiya Janata Party
- Spouse: Rajeev Rajale
- Parent: Mla Ashok Dongaonkar Patil
- Profession: Politician

Monika Rajiv Rajale is an Indian politician and a member of the 14th Maharashtra Legislative Assembly. She represents Shevgaon (Vidhan Sabha constituency) and she belongs to the Bharatiya Janata Party.
