= Tukaram Gangadhar Gadakh =

Indian politician (1953–2022)

Tukaram Gangadhar Gadakh Patil
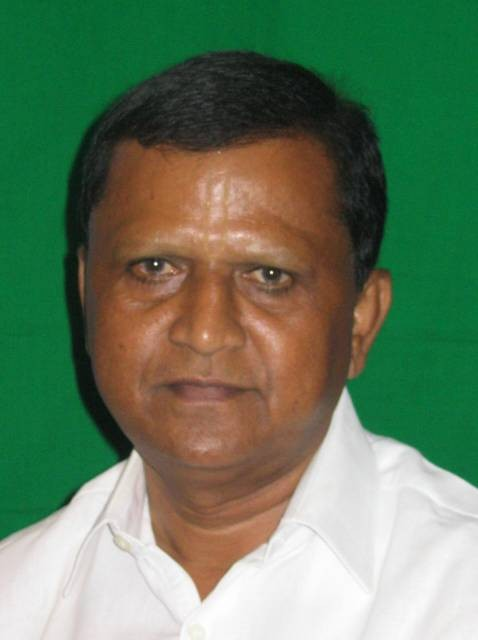

Member of Parliament, Lok Sabha
- In office 2 June 2004 – 18 May 2009
- Preceded by: Dilipkumar Gandhi
- Succeeded by: Dilipkumar Gandhi
- Constituency: Ahmednagar

Member of Maharashtra Legislative Assembly
- In office 27 February 1990 – 13 March 1995
- Preceded by: Sambhajirao Phatke
- Succeeded by: Pandurang Gamaji Abhang
- Constituency: Shegaon

Personal details
- Born: 1 November 1953 Ahmednagar, Bombay State, India
- Died: 2 December 2022 (aged 69)
- Party: Nationalist Congress Party
- Spouse: Laxmibai T. Gadakh
- Children: 1 son and 2 daughters
- As of 16 September, 2006

Tukaram Gangadhar Gadakh Patil (1 November 1953 – 2 December 2022) was an Indian politician who was a member of the 14th Lok Sabha from 2004 to 2009. He represented the Ahmednagar constituency of Maharashtra and was a member of the Nationalist Congress Party (NCP) political party.

Gadakh died from heart failure on 2 December 2022, at the age of 69.
