= Jalgaon (Jamod) Assembly constituency =

Assembly constituency in Maharashtra

Coordinates: 21.0462638°N 76.5111052°E

Jalgaon (Jamod)
- Constituency No. 27 for the Maharashtra Legislative Assembly

Constituency details
- Country: India
- Region: Western India
- State: Maharashtra
- District: Buldhana
- Lok Sabha constituency: Buldhana
- Established: 1951
- Total electors: 306,785
- Reservation: None

Member of Legislative Assembly
- 15th Maharashtra Legislative Assembly
- Incumbent Sanjay Shriram Kute
- Party: BJP
- Alliance: NDA
- Elected year: 2024

Jalgaon (Jamod) Assembly constituency is a constituency of Maharashtra Vidhan Sabha. It located in the Buldhana district. It is a part of the Buldhana Lok Sabha constituency.

== Overview ==
The Malkapur Assembly constituency in Buldhana district is a part of Raver from the neighbouring Jalgaon district.

As of 2008, the constituency includes Sangrampur tehsil, Jalgaon (Jamod) tehsil and part of Shegaon tehsil, consisting of Shegaon and Manasgaon revenue circles and Shegaon Municipal Council. The remaining part of Shegaon tehsil is in Khamgaon Assembly constituency.

The constituency was established in 1951 as the then Madhya Pradesh Vidhan Sabha (Assembly) constituency located in the Buldhana district. However it was dissolved for the 1957 elections to Mumbai state.

It was re-established for the 2009 state elections in Maharashtra.

== Members of the Legislative Assembly ==
Election	Name	Party
Until 2008: See Jalamb Assembly constituency
2009	Sanjay Kute	Bharatiya Janata Party
2014	Sanjay Kute	Bharatiya Janata Party
2019	Sanjay Kute	Bharatiya Janata Party
2024	Sanjay Kute	Bharatiya Janata Party

== Election results ==
=== Assembly Election 2024 ===
2024 Maharashtra Legislative Assembly election : Jalgaon (Jamod)
Party	Candidate	Votes	%	±%
BJP	Dr. Sanjay Kute	107,318	47.47%	▼3.52
INC	Dr. Swati Sandeep Wakekar	88,547	39.16%	▲5.66
VBA	Dr. Praveen Janardhan Patil	17,648	7.81%	▼7.07
Maharashtra Swaraj Party	Prashant Kashiram Dikkar	9,983	4.42%	New
NOTA	None of the Above	1,319	0.58%	▼0.52
Margin of victory		18,771	8.30%	▼9.18
Turnout		2,27,409	74.13%	▲4.15
Total valid votes		2,26,090		
Registered electors		3,06,785		▲5.88
BJP hold		Swing	▼3.52	

=== Assembly Election 2019 ===
2019 Maharashtra Legislative Assembly election : Jalgaon (Jamod)
Party	Candidate	Votes	%	±%
BJP	Dr. Sanjay Kute	102,735	50.98%	▲17.41
INC	Dr. Swati Sandeep Wakekar	67,504	33.50%	▲14.34
VBA	Sangitrao Bhaskarrao Bhongal	29,985	14.88%	New
NOTA	None of the Above	2,232	1.11%	▲0.65
BSP	Ramesh Dattu Nawthale	1,281	0.64%	New
Margin of victory		35,231	17.48%	▲15.02
Turnout		2,03,835	70.35%	▼2.93
Total valid votes		2,01,505		
Registered electors		2,89,736		▲10.35
BJP hold		Swing	▲17.41	

=== Assembly Election 2014 ===
2014 Maharashtra Legislative Assembly election : Jalgaon (Jamod)
Party	Candidate	Votes	%	±%
BJP	Dr. Sanjay Kute	63,888	33.57%	▲2.55
BBM	Balasaheb Alias Prasenjit Kisan Tayde	59,193	31.10%	▲2.63
INC	Burangale Ramvijay Dhyaneshwar	36,461	19.16%	▼8.08
SS	Santosh Ananda Ghatol	9,467	4.97%	New
Independent	Gholap Ramesh Punjaji	6,540	3.44%	New
NCP	Dhokane Prakash Tulshiramji	6,056	3.18%	New
MNS	Wagh Gajanan Namdevrao	2,327	1.22%	New
NOTA	None of the Above	868	0.46%	New
Margin of victory		4,695	2.47%	▼0.08
Turnout		1,91,180	72.81%	▲3.51
Total valid votes		1,90,312		
Registered electors		2,62,563		▲14.12
BJP hold		Swing	▲2.55	

=== Assembly Election 2009 ===
2009 Maharashtra Legislative Assembly election : Jalgaon (Jamod)
Party	Candidate	Votes	%	±%
BJP	Dr. Sanjay Kute	49,224	31.02%	New
BBM	Prasenjit Kisan Tayade	45,177	28.47%	New
INC	Burangale Ramvijay Dhyaneshwar	43,220	27.24%	New
Independent	Vasantrao Dandge	5,997	3.78%	New
Independent	Vasudeo Narayan Gawande	3,324	2.09%	New
AUDF	Dattatray Haribhau Dhage	2,590	1.63%	New
Independent	Wankhade Onkar Shripat	1,862	1.17%	New
Margin of victory		4,047	2.55%	
Turnout		1,58,765	69.00%	
Total valid votes		1,58,683		
Registered electors		2,30,080		
BJP win (new seat)				

== See also ==
- Jalamb Assembly constituency
- Jalgaon (Jamod)
- Sangrampur, Maharashtra
- Shegaon
