= Babanrao Dhakne =

Indian politician (1937–2023)

Babanrao Dhakne (10 November 1937 – 26 October 2023) was an Indian politician who was a member of the 9th Lok Sabha. He represented the Beed constituency of Maharashtra and was a member of the Janata Dal.

Dhakne served as the union state minister for energy resources in the cabinet of Prime Minister Chandra Shekhar. He had also held various positions in the Government of Maharashtra. Dhakne also participated in the Goa Liberation Movement. His oldest son died of heart attack in 2005 whereas his younger son Pratap Kaka Dhakne is still active in politics. He retired from public life and resided in Pune, Maharashtra. He was considered a prominent leader of the Vanjari Community of Maharashtra.

Babanrao Dhakne died of a heart attack on 26 October 2023, at the age of 85.

== Public offices held ==
- Member, Zilla Parishad, Ahmednagar, Maharashtra – 1967–77
- Chairman, Panchayat Samiti, Pathardi, Maharashtra, 1972–75
- State Minister, Maharashtra, 1978–79
- Cabinet Minister, Maharashtra, 1979–80
- Leader of Opposition, Maharashtra Legislative Assembly, 1981–82
- Deputy Speaker, Maharashtra Legislative Assembly, 1988–89
- Union Minister of State, Energy, 21 November 1990
