= Rajeev Rajale =

Indian politician

Rajiv Rajale

Member of Legislative Assembly Maharashtra
- In office (2004–2009)
- Preceded by: Dagadu Paraji Bade Patil
- Succeeded by: Chandrashekhar Marutraoji Ghule
- Constituency: Shevgaon-Pathardi

Personal details
- Born: 5 December 1969 Kasar Pimpalgaon, Pathardi taluka, Ahmednagar District
- Died: 7 October 2017 (aged 47)
- Party: Nationalist Congress Party
- Other political affiliations: Indian National Congress
- Spouse: Monika Rajale
- Parent: Appasaheb Dadaba Rajale (Father)
- Relatives: Mla Ashok Dongaonkar Patil (father-in-law)
- Profession: Politician

Rajeev Bhau Appasaheb Rajale ( आमदार राजीव भाऊ राजळे ) (born 5 December 1969 in Kasar Pimpalgaon, Maharashtra, India) and (died 7 Oct 2017 at age of 48) was an Indian politician. He was an elected member of the Indian National Congress party in the Maharashtra State Assembly. He represented 231 Pathardi Shevgaon constituency.

== Early life ==
Rajale attended Pravara public school. Later, he attended the University of Pune and graduated with a Bachelor of Architecture.

== Career ==
He joined politics in 1995 at the age of 24. Rajale began as a youth congress campaigner. He stood for election the same year, but lost. In 2004, he was elected to the State Assembly. He became popular among farmers and youth. He hosted many cultural programs, inviting artists from various fields and honoring them. He contested Loksabha Elections in 2014 from the Nationalist Congress Party. He is the nephew of former Revenue Minister and senior Congress leader Balasaheb Thorat.

== Death ==
He died on 7 October 2017 after long-term illness at age 48 in Mumbai.

== Positions ==
Positions	Organisation
Member Of Legislative Assembly 2004-2009	231, Pathardi constituency, Ahmednagar, Maharshtra
