= Pandurang Gamaji Abhang =

Indian politician

Pandurang Gamaji Abhang is the President of ‘Deenmitrakar’ Mukundrao Patil Smarak Samiti.

Abhang is a veteran leader in the co-operative sector in Ahmednagar district. He was the Member of Maharashtra Legislative Assembly from 1995 to 1999. Hailing from an agricultural background, he was inspired by Yashwantrao Chavan and Marutrao Ghule Patil. Beginning his career at a grassroots level, in the political and co-operative sector, he was elevated to the post of Chairman of Ahmednagar District Central Co-operative Bank (the largest co-operative bank in Asia). He is also the vice-chairman of Shri. Dnyaneshwar Co-operative Sugar Factory Ltd. and has been associated with the day-to-day functioning since its inception; working for the well-being and prosperity of ordinary farmers and rural people. Nominated to various social and political organizations, he has used them to serve the public at- large. He has also served on the board of trustees for Shri. Saibaba Sansthan Shirdi and is an active trustee on Sant Dnyaneshwar Trust Newasa. In addition, he is the founder and chief mentor of Samata Rural Multi-state Co-operative credit Society, which meets the financial and banking needs of the underprivileged and common people. He has incepted various co-operative institutions, cotton ginning factory, primary agricultural societies, Ahmednagar District Labour Federation etc. He is serving in the management of various schools, high schools, colleges; shaping the future generations of the country.

== Timeline ==
- 1967-71: Sarpanch, Kukana Grampanchayat
- 1971-74: Vice Chairman, Kukana Agricultural Society
- 1973-77: Director, Newasa Agricultural Produce Market Committee
- 1974-78: Newasa Taluka Kharedi-Vikri Sangh
- 1977- Foundation of Dnyaneshwar Co-op Sugar Factory
- 1977-85, 1994–95, 2004-till date: Vice President, Dnyaneshwar Co-op Sugar Factory
- 1979-90: Member of Ahmednagar Zilla Parishad
- 1980-90: Director, Ahmednagar Dist. Labour Federation
- 1982-85: President, Ahmednagar Dist. Labour Federation
- 1985-90, 2008-till date: Director, Ahmednagar Dist. Central Co-op Bank.
- 1985: Dnyaneshwar Oil Mill
- 1995-1999: Member of Maharashtra Legislative Assembly
- 1995-till date: President, Deenmitrakar Mukundrao Patil Trust
- 1997-till date: Vice President, Samata Parishad
- 1997-till date: Trustee, Dnyaneshwar Temple Trust
- 1998-till date: Vice President, Charkradhar Swami Trust
- 1998: Foundation of Samata Rural Co-op Credit Soc.Ltd
- 1998: Advisory Member, Mahatma Phule Agricultural University
- 1999: Establishment of Dnyaneshwar Ginning & Pressing Factory
- 2004-2014: Observer, Pune District Nationalist Congress Party
- 2004-10: Trustee, Saibaba Sansthan Trust, Shirdi
- 2010-13: President, Ahmednagar Dist. Central Co-op Bank
- 2014-till date: President, Ahmednagr Dist. Nationalist Congress Party
  - secretary :Late Marutrao Ghule Patil Charitable Trust
  - Vice President: Late Marutrao Ghule Patil Education Soc.
  - Member: Maharshtra State Rural Employment Board

== Awards and recognition ==
1. Dr. Patangrao Kadam Foundation's Lifetime Achievement Award
2. Late Sahakarmahrshi Bhausaheb Thorat Award for Excellence in Co-operative Sector
3. Press Reporters and Editors Association Maharashtra- Lifetime Achievement, Award

Under his leadership:

1. NABARD's Kisan Club Award to ADCC Bank, Ahmednagar,
2. Economical Development Corporation for Women's Award for Empowerment of Rural Women in Maharashtra.
3. Banking Frontier's National Level Awards (3 Categories)
  1. Excellency in Network Banking,
  2. NPA Management
  3. Statutory Compliance

Study Tour 1994-Agricultural study tour on Water Management to Israel. Countries travelled- Germany, France, Italy, Austria, Switzerland and Netherlands.
