= Wani, Yavatmal =

City in Maharashtra, India

Wani
- City
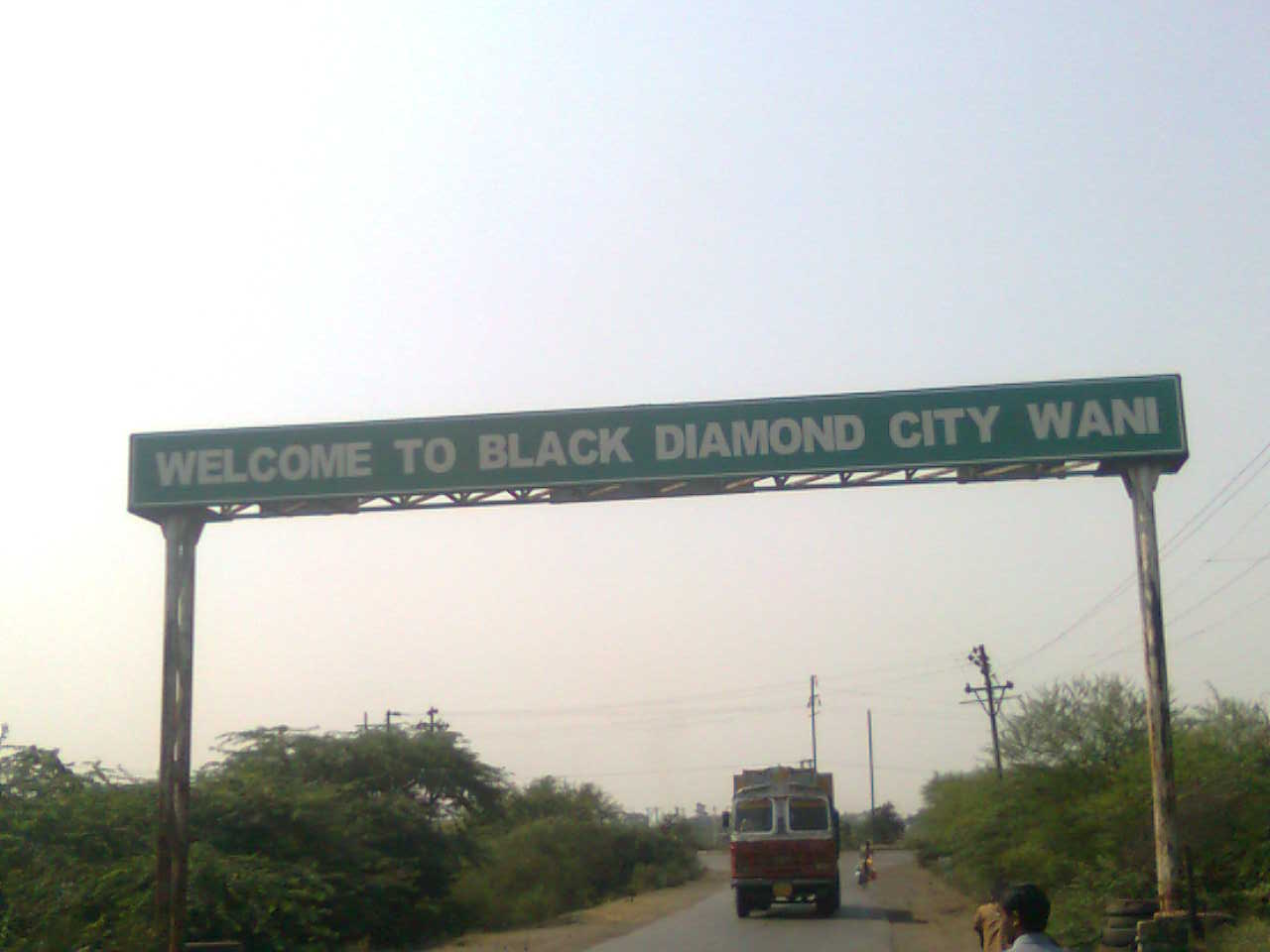
- Entrance, Wani
- Nickname: Black Diamond City
- Location in Maharashtra, India
- Coordinates: 20°03′20″N 78°57′12″E
- Country: India
- State: Maharashtra
- Region: Vidarbha
- Division: Amravati
- District: Yavatmal

Government
  - Type: Municipal Council
  - Body: Wani Municipal Council

Area
  - City: 22.50 km^{2} (8.69 sq mi)
- Elevation: 228 m (748 ft)

Population (2011)
  - City: 58,840
  - Estimate: 82,000 (as of 2,024)
  - Rank: Yavatmal : 3rd
  - Density: 2,615/km^{2} (6,773/sq mi)
  - Metro: 213,668
- Demonym: Wanikar

Languages
  - Official: Marathi, Hindi language
- Time zone: UTC+5:30 (IST)
- PIN: 445304
- Telephone Code: 07239
- Vehicle registration: MH29
- Website: www.yavatmal.nic.in/wani

Wani is a 3rd largest city in Yavatmal district in the Indian state of Maharashtra.

Wani is located in eastern part of Yavatmal district and borders Chandrapur district. Despite being a taluka, Wani is important commercial hub for nearby area due to its strong market and its crucial location. Yavatmal city is 110 km from Wani and Chandrapur is only 52 km. Nagpur is 135 km from Wani and Wardha is 120 km by road connectivity. Amravati is 200 Kms from Wani City.

For its strategic location, great connectivity and rich abundance of many minerals, Wani holds an importance place in the region.

== History ==
Wani has a rich history from Stone age to Satvahan and earlier Gond kings. Suresh Chopane a researcher based from wani, discovered Mesolithic stone age sites at Susari and Mardi, Wani has age old rock cut temples, including the Rangnath Swami Mandir, Kala Ram Mandir and Narsimha Mandir present in the southern part of the city.

In past, Wani was known as 'Wun'. Wani was a district headquarters in Berar Province during British Raj. Later on, Wani became a taluka with Yavatmal as district head.

== Demographics ==
As of the 2011 census of India, Wani had a population of 58,840 excluding the outer part of the city. Villages like Ganeshpur, Chikhalgaon, Waghdara, Lalguda are in city boundaries but the population is not included in the city population. The population can reach one lakh if we include these villages. Males constituted 51% of the population and females 49%. Wani had an average literacy rate of 74%, higher than the national average of 59.5%: male literacy was 80%, and female literacy was 68%. In 2011 in Wani, 13% of the population was under 6 years of age.

== Geography ==
The distance between district head Yavatmal and Wani is about 113 km (70 mi), where as the winter capital of Maharashtra Nagpur is about 132 km (82 mi). The adjacent district head Chandrapur is about 51 km (32 mi) away from Wani. Summer in Wani is generally very hot with temperature ranges in mid 40s, mainly due to coal mines. The city has its very own river, River Nirguada which further merges with River Wardha.

== Coal Mining and Economy ==
Western Coalfields Ltd., A subsidiary of Coal India Ltd. has a coal mining area - Wani North Area in the surroundings of Wani city. There are coal mines like Ukni, Pimpalgaon, Junad, Kolarpimpri, Rajur, Kumbarkhani, Ghonsa, Neeljai, Naigaon and some new upcoming mining projects near the city.

The economy of the town is mostly driven by agriculture and mining businesses in the surrounding area. Mining has been a boon for the development of rural population in the area, which provided them employment and boosted the economy. many cotton ginning and pressing units also working. cottonseed oil milling units also started in recent years. because of lime stone availability wall putty manufacturing units are working in rural areas. in MIDC metal fabrication unit, cement precast and pipe making units, dall mill (pulse processing factory) etc are working

The town received the name "Black Diamond City" due to the huge coal deposits and many coal mines in the adjacent area.

Limestone is also quarried in the area.

The principal crops are cotton and soybeans.

== Education ==
=== Schools ===
- Wani Public School and Junior College (WPSJC)
- KIDZ International School, Pragatinagar, Wani
- Sushganga Public School CBSE
- Black Diamond International School, Choriya Layout, Wani
- Shikshan Prasarak Mandal High School & Junior College
- Vivekanand Vidyalaya
- Adarsh High School
- Lions English Medium High School & Junior College
- Swarnleela International School
- Janata High School
- Macaroon Students Academy
- Smt. Nusabai Chopane Vidyalaya
- Z.P.High School
- Sunrise Convent School
- Santaji English Medium School
- Dreamz Play School
- Rajshri Shahu Maharaj Hindi Vidyalaya
- Hello Kids International (Play School)
- Scholars International School (SISMaregaon)
- Shree Vishwakarma Vocational Training Center, Wani
- Shanti Juniors, Chhoriya Layout
- Dyan Prabodhini School
- BAL VIDYA PRASARAK MANDAL
- NAVKAR PLAY SCHOOL

=== Colleges ===
- Lokmanya Tilak Mahavidyalaya, Wani
- Sushganga Polytechnic College, Naigaon
- Balaji Polytechnic College, Sawarla
- Shikshan Prasarak Mandal Institute of Pharmacy, Wani
- Shri. Jagannath Maharaj College, Wani
- Industrial Training Institute(ITI), Wani
- SCSMSS-Private Industrial Training Center, Wani.(ITI Wani)
- SCSMSS Institute of Pharmacy (IOPM)

== Religious Places ==
=== Temples ===
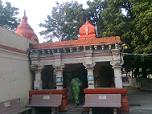
Ranganatha-Swami Temple view
- Shri Ranganatha Swami Mandir
- Shri Jaitai Mata Mandir
- Shri Jod-Mahadev Mandir
- Shri Jain Sthanak
- Shri Sambhavnath Jain Mandir
- Shri Kalaram Mandir
- Shri Sai mandir
- Shri Jagannath Maharaj Mandir
- Shri Sai Darbar
- Hanuman Mandir
- Mahakali Mata Mandir
- Santdham
- Ganpati Mandir
- Shiv Mandir
- Shani Mandir
- Shri Ram Mandir
- Vithhal Mandir
- Sant Gadge Baba Mandir
- Jata Shankar Mandir
- Gajanan Maharaj Mandir
- Datta Mandir
- Jagdamba Mandir
- Mahadev Mandir, Sutapura [Natraj chowk]
- Mahakali Mata Mandir

=== Mosques ===
- Nagina Masjid
- Madina Masjid
- Jama Masjid
- Aqsa Masjid
- Hayat Masjid

=== Gurudwara ===
- Sindhi Gurudwara

=== Churches ===
- Free Methodist Church
- New Methodist Church

== Notable Persons ==
Madhav Shrihari Aney Alias "Loknayak Bapuji Aney or Bapuji Aney" - was an ardent educationist, freedom fighter, statesman, a modern Sanskrit poet and a politician. He was also conferred with the title of "Loknayak Bapuji", which means "The People's Leader and Respected Father".[2] He was one of the founders of the Congress Nationalist Party. Born On 29 August 1880 Wani, Berar Province, Hyderabad State, British India (present-day Maharashtra, India)

== Transport ==
=== Road ===
==== Highways ====
State Highway No.	Route
MH MSH 6	Maharashtra - Madhya Pradesh border - Paratwada - Amravati - Yavatmal - Wani - Chandrapur
MH SH 233	Chimur - Warora - Wani - Rajani - Kelapur - Parwa
MH SH 236	Sangvi on MH SH 212 - Ner, Yavatmal - Babhulgaon - Kalamb - Ralegaon - Pimpalapur - Wani - Shirpur - Mohada - Kurai

==== Wani Bus Station ====
Wani Bus Station works under Maharashtra State Road Transport Corporation MSRTC.

It includes 12 Platforms, Canteen, Temple, Garden, Parking Lot, Bus Depo and Diesel Pump.

- Shivshahi Express
- Wani-Akola (via Yavatmal)
- Wani-Nagpur (via Warora)
- Ordinary Express

Wani is connected with major cities like Yavatmal, Nagpur, Pune, Aurangabad, Adilabad, Nanded, Akola, Amravati, Chandrapur, Pusad, Washim, Gadchiroli, Darwha, Digras, Ner by MSRTC buses.

- Local Express

Local buses are connected to nearby towns such as Maregaon, Pandharkawda, Korpana and several villages.

==== Local Transport ====
Auto rickshaws are the only public transport in the city.

=== Railway ===
Wani is a regular type railway station, under Nagpur division of Central Railway.

It has one platform, with single electrified line. The Railway Station is mostly busy with coal transportation.

Wani is directly connected with Adilabad, Mumbai, Nagpur, Patna, Nanded, among many other cities.

- Transport

Trains heavily transport coal and other products are also loaded.

== Population ==
=== Town/Cities ===
#	Town/Cities	Population
1	Wani Municipal Council	1,00,000 ( ESTIMATED 2024)
2	Rajur Census Town	12,678

=== Villages ===
#	Village	Population
1	Aheri	1,349
2	Amlon	472
3	Babapur	906
4	Belora	1,361
5	Besa	569
6	Bhalar	1,799
7	Bhandewada	1,096
8	Bhurki	510
9	Bodad Bk.	316
10	Borda	2,127
11	Borgaon	585
12	Borgoan	1,099
13	Bori	202
14	Bramhani	810
15	Chanakha	510
16	Chargaon	873
17	Chendkapur	357
18	Chikhalgaon	9,918
19	Chikhali	370
20	Chilai	549
21	Chincholi	307
22	Dahegaon	124
23	Dahegaon	1,339
24	Deurwada	232
25	Dhabapur	8
26	Dhakori	857
27	Dhandir	118
28	Dhoptala	239
29	Dhunki	502
30	Dongargaon	526
31	Dorli	724
32	Fulora	1,087
33	Gadeghat	245
34	Ganeshpur	1,942
35	Ghonsa	2,713
36	Godgaon	510
37	Gopalpur	320
38	Gopalpur	318
39	Gowari	444
40	Gowari	228
41	Hiwardhara	298
42	Injasan	481
43	Jugad	186
44	Junada	307
45	Kalmana Bk.	856
46	Kalmana Kh	356
47	Kawadshi	568
48	Kayar	2,730
49	Keshav Nagar	347
50	Kesurli	671
51	Khandla	976
52	Kolera	668
53	Kolgaon	859
54	Kona	1,194
55	Korambhi	493
56	Krishnanpur	1,069
57	Kumbhari	6
58	Kumbharkhani	238
59	Kundra	767
60	Kurai	1,567
61	Kurli	938
62	Lalguda	3,904
63	Lathi	607
64	Mahankalpur	573
65	Majra	551
66	Malegaon	18
67	Mandar	2,286
68	Manki	1,427
69	Maregaon	1,222
70	Matholi	1,964
71	Mendholi	1,609
72	Mohada	2,003
73	Mohorli	1,506
74	Mungoli	705
75	Murdhoni	1,878
76	Murti	238
77	Nagala	29
78	Naigaon Bk.	1,761
79	Naigaon Kh	1,125
80	Nandepera	2,407
81	Nawargaon	1,006
82	Nawegaon	1,909
83	Nerad	1,252
84	Nilapur	703
85	Niljai	191
86	Nimbala	764
87	Nimbala Bk.	649
88	Niwali	877
89	Palsoni	2106
90	Paramdoh	731
91	Parsoda	303
92	Parsoda	545
93	Patharpur	753
94	Pathri	303
95	Petur	1,072
96	Pimpalgaon	470
97	Pimpari	559
98	Pimpri	1,110
99	Pohana	277
100	Punvat	2,407
101	Purad	1,336
102	Purad	1,019
103	Rangana	918
104	Rasa	2,567
105	Sakhara	927
106	Sakhara	2,243
107	Sawangi	1,044
108	Sawarla	977
109	Shelu Bk	847
110	Shelu Kh	924
111	Shewala	219
112	Shindola	2,057
113	Shirgiri	78
114	Shirpur	2,804
115	Shivni	800
116	Somnala	729
117	Sonapur	474
118	Sonegaon	1,147
119	Suknegaon	1,475
120	Takli	329
121	Taroda	2,910
122	Tejapur	1,876
123	Ukani	2,275
124	Umari	871
125	Virkund	482
126	Vithalnagar	464
127	Wadgaon	88
128	Wadgaon Tip	615
129	Wadhona Pilki	448
130	Wadjapur	555
131	Wagdara	2,777
132	Wanjari	2,168
133	Wargaon	759
134	Warzadi	553
135	Welabai	1,632
136	Welhala	3,255
137	Yenad	734
138	Yenak	1,424
139	Zarpat	492
140	Zola	623

ref:www.census2011.co.in

== Languages ==
Marathi language is the dominant language
