= Mohda =

Village in Maharashtra, India

- Location in Maharashtra, India
- Coordinates: 20.2236°N 78.4660°E
- Country: India
- State: Maharashtra
- District: Yavatmal
- Tehsil: Kelapur-Pandharkaoda
- Elevation: 230 m (750 ft)

Population (2011-2022)
  - Total: 5,544−6,209

Languages
  - Official: Marathi
- Time zone: UTC+5:30 (IST)
- PIN: 445323
- Vehicle registration: MH29
- Website: maharashtra.gov.in

Mohda is a village in Yavatmal district of Maharashtra State in India. Mohda is located at: SH-234 It is situated 47 kilometres (29 mi) from district place Yavatmal.

It is a famous marketplace in Yavatmal District. It is near the Saikheda Dam, an earthfill dam on the Khuni River.

== Demographics ==
The Mohada Village is located in Kelapur Taluka, 5544 People are living in this Village, 2836 are males and 2708 are females as per the 2011 census. The expected Mohada population in 2021/2022 is between 5,433 and 6,209. Literate people are 3921 out of 2137 are male and 1784 are female. People living in Mohada depend on multiple skills, the total number of workers is 2880 out of which men are 1661 and women are 1219. A total of 371 Cultivators are depended on agriculture farming out of 316 are cultivated by men and 55 are by women. 1632 people work in agricultural land as labour in Mohada, men are 931 and 701 are women.

(Caste Factor) Schedule Tribe (ST) constitutes 24.37% while Schedule Caste (SC) was 7.32% of the total population in Mohada village.
