= Durgada =

Durgada may refer to:

- Durgada, Kakinada district, a village in Gollaprolu mandal, Kakinada district, Andhra Pradesh, India
- Durgada, Yavatmal district, a village in Maregaon tahsil, Yavatmal district, Maharashtra, India
- Durgada, Wardha district, a village in Deoli tahsil, Wardha district, Maharashtra, India
