= Asegaon =

Asegaon may refer to:

- Asegaon, Yavatmal, a village in Yavalmal district of Maharashtra state of India
- Asegaon, Jintur, a village in Parbhani district of Maharashtra state of India
