= Yavatmal =

Municipality in India

- City
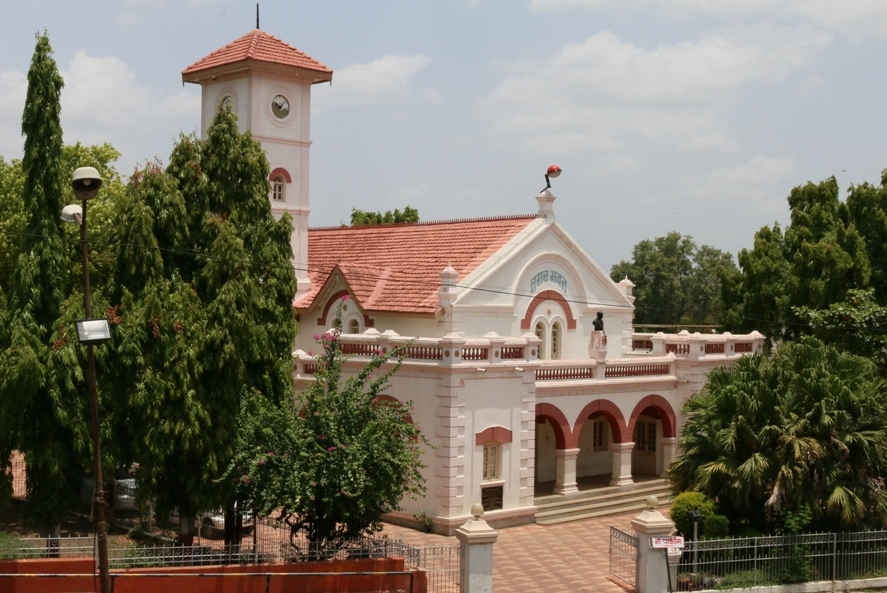
- Yavatmal Municipal Council
- Yavatmal in Maharashtra
- Coordinates: 20.24°N 78.06°E
- Country: India
- State: Maharashtra
- Region: Vidarbha
- District: Yavatmal

Government
  - Type: Municipality
  - Body: Yavatmal Municipal Council

Area
  - Total: 90 km^{2} (35 sq mi)
  - Rank: 5 in Vidharbh
- Elevation: 445 m (1,460 ft)

Population (2011)
  - Total: 116,551
  - Density: 1,300/km^{2} (3,400/sq mi)
- Demonym: Yavatmalkar

Languages
  - Official: Marathi
- Time zone: UTC+5:30 (IST)
- PIN: 445001-445002
- Telephone code: 07232
- Vehicle registration: MH-29
- Website: www.yavatmal.nic.in

Yavatmal is a city and municipal council in the Indian state of Maharashtra. It is the administrative headquarters of Yavatmal District. Yavatmal is around 90 km away from divisional headquarters Amravati while it is 670 km (420 mi) away from the state capital Mumbai and 150 km south west of Nagpur.

== Etymology ==
The name is derived from the Marathi Yavat (mountain) and mal (row). Another theory is it might be derived from Yavateshwar (Lord Shiva) and Mal (one of the marathi word for Plateau) as the city is located on a plateau, which is comparatively higher altitude than its other tehsils.

Ain-i-Akbari records Yavatmal as the headquarters of a pargana under the name of Yot-Lohara – Yot being the Urdu or Persian corruption of Yevata, the original name of the town; Lohara the name of a village about 5 km (3 mi) to the west of Yavatmal, and the suffix mal is a corruption of mahal (or pargana).

== History ==
Formerly known as "Yeoti" or "Yeotmal", Yavatmal was the main town of the Berar Sultanate and according to old writings "the safest place in the world". The then region of Yavatmal (now Yavatmal district), was part of the dominion of Aladdin Hassan Bahman Shah who founded the Bahmani Sultanate in 1347. In 1572, Murtaza Shah, ruler of the Ahmadnagar Sultanate (current day Ahmadnagar District), annexed the Yavatmal district. In 1596, Chand Bibi, warrior queen of Ahmadnagar, ceded the district of Yavatmal to the Mughal Empire, then rulers of a large part of India. Following the death of the sixth Mughal Emperor Aurangzeb in 1707, Yavatmal was passed on to the Maratha Empire. When Raghoji I Bhonsle became ruler of the Nagpur kingdom in 1783, he included the Yavatmal district in his territory. After the British East India Company created Berar Province in 1853, Yavatmal became part of East Berar District in 1863 and later part of the South East Berar district—both districts of the Central Provinces and Berar. Yavatmal remained part of Madhya Pradesh until the 1956 reorganisation of states when it was transferred to the Bombay State. With the creation of the Maharashtra state on 1 May 1960, Yavatmal district became a part of the same.

Yavatmal Municipal Council was constituted in 1869 but was dissolved shortly thereafter. It was established again in 1894 and thus forms the oldest municipal council in the district. Mr. Eliot was first mayor and Lieutenant, W. Hege was deputy mayor. Govind Punaji Bari was the first Indian president of the Yavatmal Municipal council (2 January 1914 to 31 May 1932). The first elections conducted for the position of president of municipal council were held on 22 December 1934. Prior to that the same was appointed.

The mini-train called Shakuntala is a historic remark built by the British government to transport cotton which is now closed.

== Geography ==
=== Climate ===
This city has a tropical savannah climate. The Köppen-Geiger climate classification is Aw. In Yavatmal, the average annual temperature is 26.8 °C. The rainfall here averages 946 mm.

Climate data for Yavatmal (1991–2020, extremes 1949–2020)
Month	Jan	Feb	Mar	Apr	May	Jun	Jul	Aug	Sep	Oct	Nov	Dec	Year
Record high °C (°F)	35.2 (95.4)	38.8 (101.8)	41.8 (107.2)	45.5 (113.9)	46.6 (115.9)	46.6 (115.9)	39.5 (103.1)	35.8 (96.4)	38.2 (100.8)	37.4 (99.3)	34.9 (94.8)	34.0 (93.2)	46.6 (115.9)
Mean daily maximum °C (°F)	28.4 (83.1)	31.4 (88.5)	36.0 (96.8)	39.8 (103.6)	41.3 (106.3)	36.2 (97.2)	30.2 (86.4)	28.9 (84.0)	30.6 (87.1)	31.5 (88.7)	29.8 (85.6)	28.5 (83.3)	32.5 (90.5)
Mean daily minimum °C (°F)	14.7 (58.5)	17.1 (62.8)	21.0 (69.8)	24.5 (76.1)	26.6 (79.9)	24.5 (76.1)	22.4 (72.3)	21.8 (71.2)	21.7 (71.1)	20.1 (68.2)	17.1 (62.8)	14.5 (58.1)	20.3 (68.5)
Record low °C (°F)	6.4 (43.5)	7.2 (45.0)	9.8 (49.6)	13.5 (56.3)	18.2 (64.8)	16.1 (61.0)	15.2 (59.4)	16.0 (60.8)	16.3 (61.3)	13.0 (55.4)	8.6 (47.5)	6.2 (43.2)	6.2 (43.2)
Average rainfall mm (inches)	15.5 (0.61)	9.6 (0.38)	17.9 (0.70)	11.1 (0.44)	13.4 (0.53)	180.0 (7.09)	285.6 (11.24)	238.4 (9.39)	134.7 (5.30)	55.1 (2.17)	11.9 (0.47)	3.9 (0.15)	977.2 (38.47)
Average rainy days	1.0	0.9	1.5	1.3	1.1	8.7	13.9	11.8	8.2	3.2	0.9	0.3	52.6
Average relative humidity (%) (at 17:30 IST)	38	31	24	22	25	50	72	77	68	56	46	40	46
Source: India Meteorological Department

== Demographics ==
As of 2011 Indian Census, Yavatmal had a total population of 116,551, of which 58,549 were males and 58,002 were females. The population within the age group of 0 to 6 years was 11,360. The total number of literates in Yavatmal was 96,726, which constituted 82.9% of the population with male literacy of 85.1% and female literacy of 80.9%. The effective literacy rate of 7+ population of Yavatmal was 91.9%, of which the male literacy rate was 94.8% and the female literacy rate was 89.1%. The Scheduled Castes and Scheduled Tribes population was 19,816 and 6,543 respectively. Yavatmal had 26,173 households in 2011.

Year	Male	Female	Total Population	Change
2001	61780	58896	120676	-
2011	58549	58002	116551	-0.034

=== Religion ===
Religion in Yavatmal City (2011)
Religion	Percent
Hinduism	69.13%
Islam	14.93%
Buddhism	12.93%
Jainism	1.99%
Others	1.01%

Majority of the population follow Hinduism, followed by significant Muslim and Buddhist minorities.

=== Language ===
The principal language of the Yavatmal district is Marathi however Varhadi dialect of Marathi majorly spoken by people of Yavatmal. However, since the district has numerous Scheduled and Nomadic Tribes, other languages such as Gormati or Banjari, Gondi, Beldari, Urdu, Telugu and Kolami are also spoken in parts of the district. In 1973, the Marathi Sahitya Sammelan (Marathi Literature Conference) was hosted in the city for the first time which was presided over by Gajanan Digambar Madgulkar. The second time, it was hosted on 11 January 2019 chaired by Vaishali Yende, widow of a suicide victim farmer, to highlight the issue of farmer suicides in the area.

== Economy ==
During British rule, Yavatmal city was classified as a hill station. Both cotton-ginning and pressing are carried on in Yavatmal, while the town is also the chief trading center in the district and connected by road with Dhamangaon station, 29 miles (47 km) away. Major business establishments in Yavatmal include the Raymond UCO mill that produces denim fabrics for jeans. There are establishments related to the cotton, and textile industries. There is a 106-acre (0.43 km^{2}) textile Special Economic Zone (SEZ) under construction while HLL Unilever has also decided to restart the plant they currently have in the city. Other local businesses in the town are dominated by the presence of agricultural supply facilities used by the nearby farming community.

Banking services are available in the Yavatmal, Arni, Ner, Pusad, Digras, Ghatanji and Kelapur and Wani areas.

The major industrial centres are at: MIDC Lohara, Darwha, Digras, Pusad, Umerkhed, Wani, Umari, Kelapur, Ralegaon and Babhulgaon, Ner, and Wani-Maregaon with the main market places in: Yavatmal City, Arni, Wani, Darwha, Digras, Ghatanji, Mohada, Pusad, Umerkhed and Kelapur.

== Culture ==
Yavatmal is known for its unique Navratri festival celebration, the whole city is known for organising huge celebration events for Navratri. Festivals like Gudi Padwa, Diwali, Dussehra, Christmas, Easter Sunday and almost all Hindu and Christian occasions are celebrated. The district is also home to a Buddhist community, and they celebrate Ambedkar Jayanti in huge gatherings.

=== Landmarks ===
==== Prerna Sthal ====
The Prerna Sthal is a memorial and cultural landmark dedicated to Jawaharlal Darda, an Indian independence activist and politician of the Indian National Congress. It also serves as a venue for musical programmes.

== Transport ==
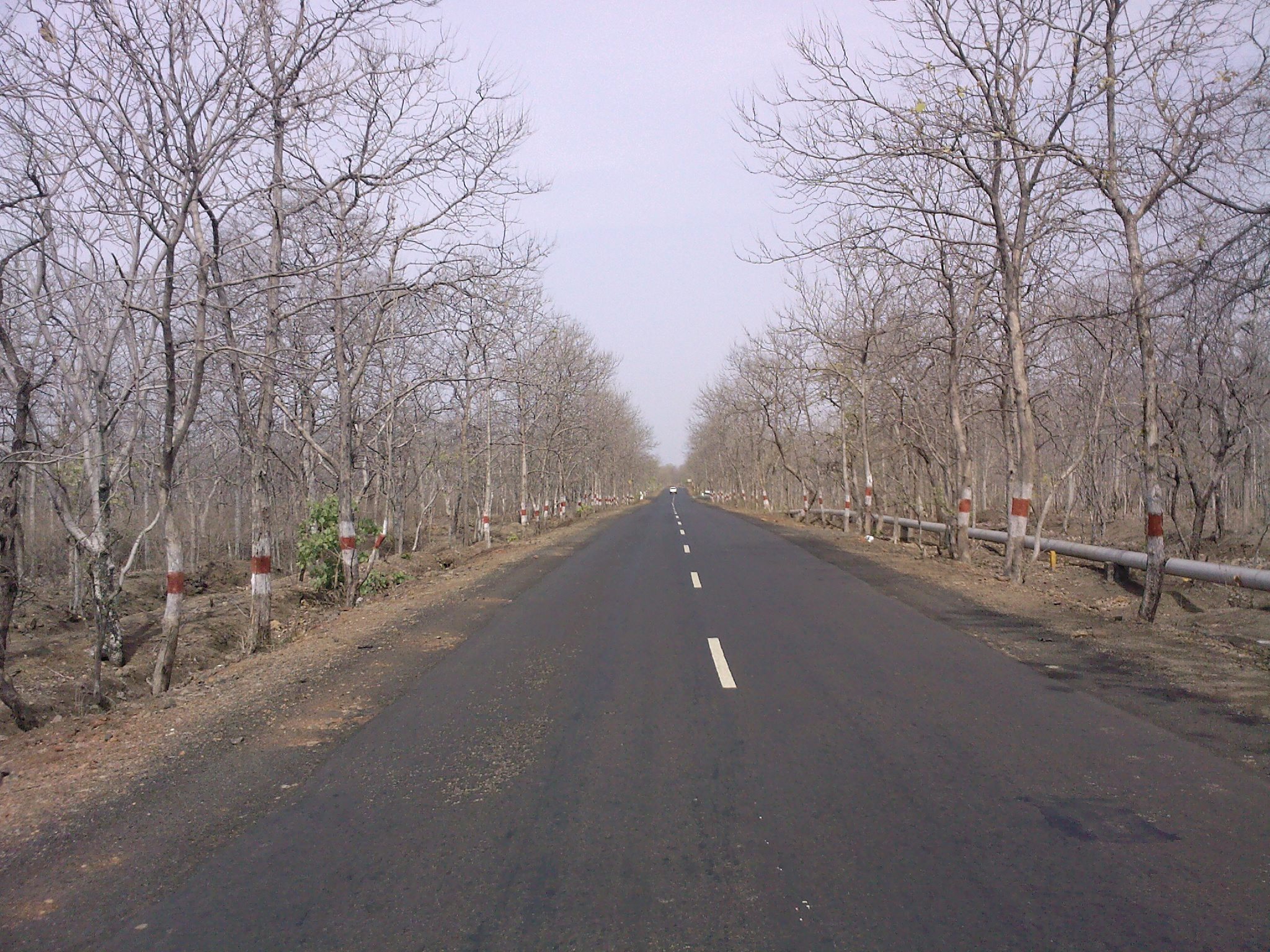
Nursery Road, Yavatmal.

=== Roads ===
- New Shaktipith Expressway will pass through Yavatmal city and district Nagpur-Yavatmal-Goa Express
- The National Highway NH 44 (Varanasi–Kanyakumari) passes through the district at Vadki, Karanji, Pandharkawada, Patanbori, and Kelapur.
- New National Highway has been proposed from Khandwa(MP)- Dharni-Amravati-Yavatmal-Karanji on NH 44.
- The state highway (Amravati–Chandrapur) passes through Ner, Yavatmal, Jodmoha, Mohada, Umari, Karanji and Wani.
- The (Nagpur–Tuljapur) National highway 361 passes through Kalamb, Yavatmal, Arni, and Umarkhed.
- Mumbai–Nagpur Expressway will directly connect to Yavatmal City with feeder roads.

=== Railways ===
- Yavatmal is the southern terminus of the 762 mm (30.0 in) narrow gauge railway known locally as the Shakuntala Railway. This line is composed of two legs intersecting with the 5 ft 6 in (1,676 mm) Broad gauge Howrah-Nagpur-Mumbai line at Murtijapur – the 76 km (47 mi) northern leg to Achalpur and the 113 km (70 mi) southeastern leg to Yavatmal. Darwha Station lies on this line.
- Another line, Majri–Mudkhed line, passes through the district. Wani is a railway station on this line. The state cabinet has approved Wardha–Nanded rail link project. This railway line will connect Wardha–Yavatmal in Vidarbha with Nanded in Marathwada.
- India's First broad-gauge Metro will run From Nagpur to Yavatmal on Nagpur-Wardha, Wardha-Yavatmal-Nanded line.
- SURVEY REPORTS SUBMITTED TO BOARD for approval for new broad gauge line between Yavatmal-Adilabad Via Ghatanji, Pandharkawada, Chankha

=== Airport ===
==== International ====
- Dr. Babasaheb Ambedkar International Airport, Nagpur is 150 km away From Yavatmal City.

==== Regional ====
- Yavatmal airport is located 9 km (5.6 mi) east of the city of Yavatmal and has been taken up by Reliance Airport Developers Ltd for development.

== Education ==
- Shri Vasantrao Naik Government Medical College

== Notable people ==
- Keshav Baliram Hedgewar, Founding Sarsanghachalak of the Rashtriya Swayamsevak Sangh
- Aajibai Banarase, community leader and president of Maharashtra Mandal London.
- Vijay Darda, former MP (Rajya Sabha), Chairman Lokmat media Pvt. Ltd
- Jambuwantrao Dhote, politician and founder of Vidarbha Janata Congress
- Nachiket Mor, banker and National Director for Bill and Melinda Gates Foundation.
- Sudhakarrao Naik, former Chief Minister of Maharashtra.
- Vasantrao Naik, former Chief Minister of Maharashtra.
- Sanjay Rathod, former Guardian minister Yavatmal
- Manikrao Thakare, former President Maharashtra State Congress Committee
- Madan Madhukarrao Yerawar, former Guardian minister Yavatmal
- Wasudev Waman Patankar, Marathi poet and advocate (1908–1997)
- Akash Chikte, Indian field hockey player
- Suryakanta Patil, Indian politician
- Lalit Yadav, Vidharbha cricketer
- Alind Naidu, Vidharbha cricketer
- Ashok Uike, Former Minister of Tribal Development
- Vasant Purke, Politician and former Minister of Education
- Jawaharlal Darda, Freedom Fighter
- Madhav Shrihari Aney (Loknayak Bapuji Aney [Padma Vibhushan]) Ardent educationist, freedom fighter, statesman, a modern Sanskrit poet and a politician
- Rajendra Darda, Politician
- Shivajirao Moghe, Former Minister of Social Justice in Maharashtra Cabinet
- Faheem Hussain, Pakistani physicist
- Harising Nasaru Rathod, Politician

== See also ==
- Rani Amravati
- Make in Maharashtra
