= Asegaon, Yavatmal =

Village in Maharashtra

Asegaon
- village
- Location in Maharashtra, India Asegaon (India)
- Coordinates: 20.4°N 78.13°E
- Country: India
- State: Maharashtra
- District: Yavatmal
- Tehsil: Babhulgaon
- Village: Asegaon
- Elevation: 445 m (1,460 ft)
- Time zone: UTC+5:30 (IST)
- PIN: 445001
- Telephone code: 07232

Asegaon, also known as Asegoan Devi, is a village in Babhulgaon, a tehsil of Yavatmal district of Maharashtra in India.

Mother Jagadamba is an ancient temple in the village. Annually, Navaratri festival is celebrated here.

== See also ==
- Rani Amravati
