= Dhakori =

Village in Maharashtra

- Village
- Location in Maharashtra, India Dhakori (India)
- Coordinates: 19.827690°N 78.997020°E
- Country: India
- State: Maharashtra
- Region: Vidharba
- District: Yavatmal
- Tahsil: Wani

Government
  - Type: Gram Panchayat
  - Body: Dhakori Grampanchayat
- Elevation: 212 m (696 ft)

Languages
  - Official: Marathi
- Time zone: UTC+5:30 (IST)
- PIN: 445307
- Telephone code: +917184 ******
- Vehicle registration: MH-29
- Nearest city: Wani
- Lok Sabha constituency: Chandrapur Lok Sabha constituency
- Vidhan Sabha constituency: Wani (Vidhan Sabha constituency)

Dhakori is a village in the Wani tahsil of Yavatmal District of Maharashtra state in India. The village is characterized by its rural setting and primarily agricultural economy. The village's population is engaged mainly in farming and related agricultural activities, which form the backbone of its local economy. The village is 2 km north of the Painganga River on Wani-Korpana road.

According to the 2011 census of India, it has a population of 857 of which 427 are males while 430 are females.
