= Sarojini Vaidya =

Marathi writer

- Born: 15 June 1933; Akluj, Maharashtra
- Died: 3 August 2007 (aged 74)
- Occupations: Professor and head of the department of Marathi, University of Bombay

Academic background
- Education: University of Bombay

Academic work
- Main interests: Society and culture of 19th and 20th-century Maharashtra

Sarojini Shankar Vaidya (15 June 1933 – 3 August 2007) was a Marathi writer and specialist in the society and culture of 19th and 20th-century Maharashtra.

== Academic career ==
Vaidya received her PhD from the University of Bombay, submitting a thesis on the Marathi writer Natyachhatakar Diwakar. She later became a professor and head of the university's department of Marathi.

== Works ==
Her works traversed the boundaries of the forms of criticism, the personal essay, short story, biography and autobiography. They include Pahatapani (1975), a collection of literary essays; Mati ani murti (1976), a collection of articles on Marathi literature; and a biography of the social thinker Gopalrao Hari, written in 1975. Also in 1975, she edited and completed Atmacharitra, ani charitra, the autobiography of the Marathi writer Kashibai Kanitkar. She later published Shabdayan (1980), a collection of personal essays; and Sankramana (1985), a volume of essays on figures including the social reformer Pandita Ramabai, the physician Anandi Gopal Joshi. She was also the coauthor of the biographies Natavarya Nanasaheb Phatak vyatki ani kala (1982), about a Marathi theatre performer; and Shrimati Ramabai Ranade vyatki ani karya (1989), about the social worker Ramabai Ranade. Volumes edited by Vaidya include Sanjeevani (1958), Jara javoon yeto (Selected stories of D. B. Mokashi) (1987), Vangamayeen mahatta (1990), T. S. Eliot and Modern Marathi Poetry and Literary Criticism (1990), Streejivan vatchal ani vikas (1992), and Samagra Divakar (1992).

== Bibliography ==
=== As author ===
- Pahatapani (1975)
- Mati ani murti (1976)
- Shabdayan (1980)
- Natavarya Nanasaheb Phatak vyatki ani kala (1982, coauthored with Vasant Phatak)
- Sankramana (1985)
- Shrimati Ramabai Ranade vyatki ani karya (1989, coauthored with M. S. Vidhvansa)
- Kahāṇī Laṇḍanacyā Ājībāīñcī (2001)

=== As editor ===
- Sanjeevani (1958)
- Jara javoon yeto (Selected stories of D. B. Mokashi) (1987)
- Vangamayeen mahatta (1990)
- T. S. Eliot and Modern Marathi Poetry and Literary Criticism (1990)
- Streejivan vatchal ani vikas (1992)
- Samagra Divakar (1992)
