= Borisinh =

- Village
- Interactive map of Borisinh
- Coordinates: 20.1515394°N 78.0829346°E
- Country: India
- State: Maharashtra
- District: Yavatmal

Languages
  - Official: Marathi
- Time zone: UTC+5:30 (IST)

Borisinh is a village in Yavatmal district in the Indian state of Maharashtra. Its population at the 2011 Census of India was 1,539.
