= Deshmukhs of Parwa =

Maratha royal house that ruled the Jagir of Parwa, Vidharbha

The Deshmukhs of Parwa were a Maratha royal house that ruled the Jagir of Vidarbha, India.

== History ==
Based on records from the Mughal period, Nagoji Basawantrai is the earliest known member. The family dealt with revolts and maintained control over several Paraganas under the Mughal Empire.

The founder of the family, Nagoji, was granted Inam lands by Aurangzeb for his military support. Nagoji's family maintained the Deshmukhi rights over several Paraganas, including Kelapur.

Dhumanji, the son of Nagoji, and an ally of Raghoji Bhonsle, had a rule marked by his conflict with Kanhoji Bhonsla, a Maratha leader. Kanhoji's military actions against Dhumanji led to personal and family hardships, including imprisonment and ransom payments.

Yeshwantrao's reign saw events, including the defeat of Bajirao II during the battle at Sioni. Nagorao faced financial and political struggles during the Nizam's rule, including imprisonment and disputes over the Watan (inheritance of land). However, his fortunes improved after the War of American Independence boosted cotton prices.

== Contributions and legacy ==
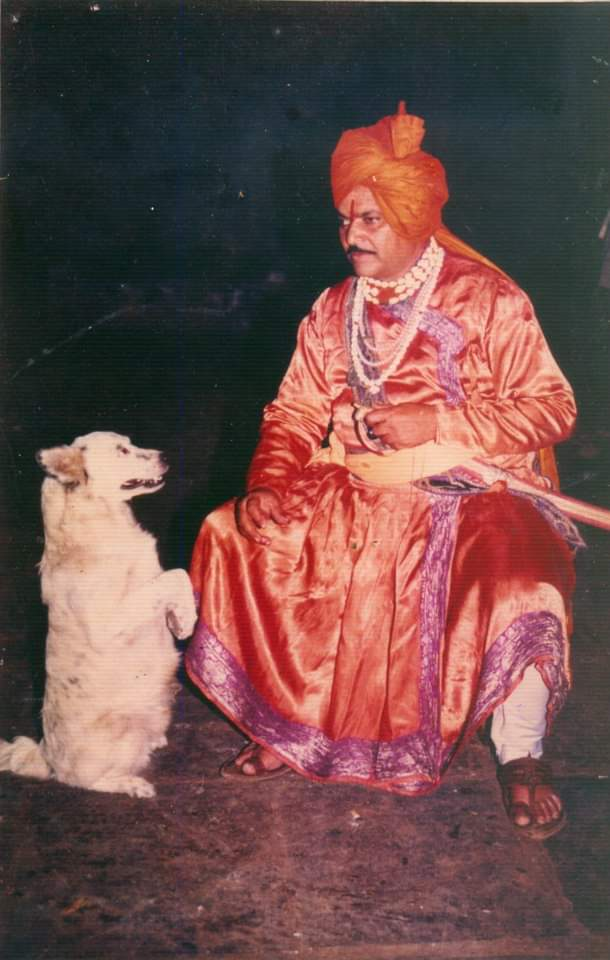
Babasaheb Deshmukh Pawrekar

The Deshmukhs of Parwa are associated with the Babasaheb Deshmukh Parwekar Mahavidyalaya in Parwa by Babasaheb Pawrekar, a philanthropist.

Several members of the Parwekar family hold positions as MLAs.

Balwantrao Deshmukh Jarangkar, a member of the Deshmukh family, has raised concerns related to agrarian distress, irrigation, rural development, and the welfare of farmers in the Vidarbha region.
