= Durgada, Yavatmal district =

Village in Maharashtra

Durgada
- Village
- Location in India
- Coordinates: 20°4′21″N 78°38′41″E
- Country: India
- State: Maharashtra
- District: Yavatmal
- Tahsil: Maregaon

Area
  - Total: 4.19 km^{2} (1.62 sq mi)

Population (2011)
  - Total: 60
  - Density: 14/km^{2} (37/sq mi)

Languages
  - Official: Marathi
- Time zone: UTC+5:30 (IST)
- PIN: 445302

Durgada is a village in Maregaon tahsil, Yavatmal district, Maharashtra, India.

== Demographics ==
As of the census of 2011, there were 60 people residing in the village. The population density was 14 people per square kilometer (36 people/mi^{2}). There were 18 households within the village. Males constitute 45% of the population and females 55%. Durgada has an average literacy rate of 56.6%, significantly lower than the national average of 74%. Male literacy is at 26.6%, while female literacy is 30%. In Durgada, 11.6% of the population is age 6 or under.
