= Zari Jamani =

Town in Maharashtra, India

- town
- Location in Maharashtra, India
- Coordinates: 19.862452°N 78.726504°E
- Country: India
- State: Maharashtra
- District: Yavatmal

Languages
  - Official: Marathi
- Time zone: UTC+5:30 (IST)

Zari Jamani or Zari Jamni is a town in Wani Subdivision of Yavatmal district in the Indian state of Maharashtra.
