= Rani Amravati =

Village in Maharashtra

Rani Amravati is a village in Babhulgaon tehsil, Yavatmal district, Maharashtra, India. Its population in 1991 was around 2,254.

It seats on the bank of the river Verula. The village has temple of Shiva and Bhavani. The main occupation is agriculture. Most of the people are educated.
A road ahead leads to Asegaon. Asegaon has a temple of goddess Asegaon Devi.

Mahashivratri is the village festival.

== Notable people ==
Nikhilkumar Katkar is a notable person from this village. He completed his B.Tech. in mechanical engineering from COEP Pune.
