= Umarsara =

- Census town
- Location in Maharashtra, India
- Coordinates: 20.3821°N 78.1305°E
- Country: India
- State: Maharashtra
- District: Yavatmal

Population (2001)
  - Total: 19,064

Languages
  - Official: Marathi
- Time zone: UTC+5:30 (IST)

Umarsara is a census town in Yavatmal district in the Indian state of Maharashtra.

== Demographics ==
At the 2001 India census, Umarsara had a population of 19,064 (53% male, 47% female). The average literacy rate was 82%, higher than the national average of 59.5%; male literacy was 86% and female literacy was 78%. 11% of the population was under 6 years of age.

Year	Male	Female	Total Population	Change	Religion (%)							
Year	Male	Female	Total Population	Change	Hindu	Muslim	Christian	Sikhs	Buddhist	Jain	Other religions and persuasions	Religion not stated
2001	10,128	9,031	19,159	-	82.311	0.934	0.073	0.251	15.664	0.454	0.313	0.000
2011	11,138	10,614	21,752	0.135	81.367	0.653	0.175	0.055	16.307	0.363	0.041	1.039
