= Borgaon Dam =

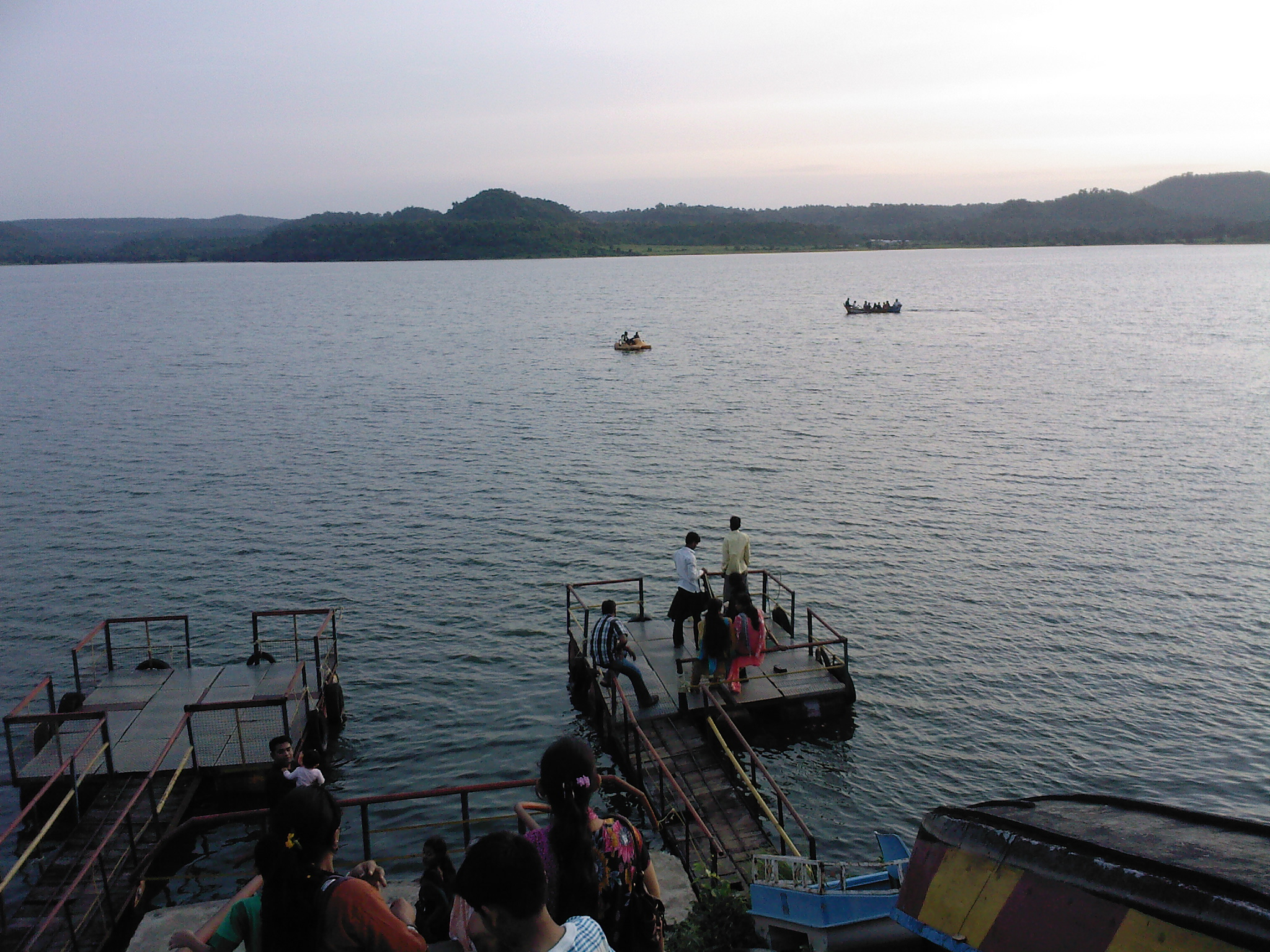
- borgaon dam, yavatmal

- Location within Maharashtra
- Official name: Borgaon Dam D02847
- Location: Yavatmal
- Coordinates: 20.4463156°N 78.1896973°E
- Opening date: 1993
- Owners: Government of Maharashtra, India

Dam and spillways
- Type of dam: Earthfill
- Impounds: local river
- Height: 20 m (66 ft)
- Length: 830 m (2,720 ft)
- Dam volume: 0.01404 km^{3} (0.00337 cu mi)

Reservoir
- Total capacity: 0.012224 km^{3} (0.002933 cu mi)
- Surface area: 0.288 km^{2} (0.111 sq mi)

Borgaon Dam, is an earthfill dam on local river near Yavatmal in state of Maharashtra in India.

== Specifications ==
The height of the dam above lowest foundation is 20 m (66 ft) while the length is 830 m (2,720 ft). The volume content is 0.01404 km^{3} (0.00337 cu mi) and gross storage capacity is 0.014040 km^{3} (0.003368 cu mi).

== Purpose ==
- Irrigation

== See also ==
- Dams in Maharashtra
- List of reservoirs and dams in India
