= Aajibai Banarase =

Indian businesswoman in London

- Born: Radhabai Dahake; 1910; Choundi, Yavatmal, Maharashtra
- Died: 3 December 1983; London
- Other names: Londonchya Aajibai, Ajibai Banarse
- Occupation(s): Community leader, businesswoman

Aajibai Banarase (1910 – 3 December 1983), born Radhabai Dahake, was an Indian community leader in London. ("Ajibai" is not a personal name, but an address of familiar respect by which she was generally known; she was also called "Londonchya Aajibai," or "London's grandmother", in the Marathi community.)

== Early life ==
Radhabai Dahake was born in Choundi, Yavatmal, Maharashtra. She married young, to Tulshihar Dehenkar, and had five daughters. She was widowed at age 33. She remarried in 1945, to Sitarampant Banarase, an older widower with grown sons, Vitthal and Pandurang, already living in London.

== In London ==
Banarase moved to London with her second husband, and worked in his sons' boarding houses there. She was widowed again in 1950. In 1953, rejected by her husband's family and without other material support, Banarase borrowed money and bought a house in London's Hoop Lane, and she subleased rooms to Indian students. She also had a catering business; her Indian cooking was especially appreciated by homesick young Indians. In time, she owned twelve houses and a fleet of cars, and by 1965 she opened a Hindu temple at her home in Golders Green, visited by Indian dignitaries while in the city. She also funded a well and a temple in her hometown, Choundi.

In London she was president of the Maharashtra Mandal London. Her granddaughter, Shyamal Pitale, was president of the Maharashtra Mandal in 2019.

== Personal life ==
Banarase died in 1983, aged 73 years, in London. The Lord Mayor of London attended her funeral, to pay respect to her work in the city. A biography, Kahaani Londonchya Aajibainchi by Sarojini Vaidya, was published in Marathi in 1998. The biography was adapted into a play, Londoncharya Aajibai, by Rajiv Joshi, and toured in Great Britain in 2015, with veteran actress Usha Nadkarni playing Banarase.
