= Pandharkawada =

Pandharkawda
- City
- Location in Maharashtra, India Pandharkawda (India)
- Coordinates: 19.9594527°N 78.7261256°E
- Country: India
- State: Maharashtra
- District: yavatmal district

Population (2011)
  - Total: 31,094

Languages
  - Official: Marathi
- Time zone: UTC+5:30 (IST)
- PIN: 445302
- Telephone code: 07235
- Sex ratio: 1000:983 ♂/♀

Pandharkawda is a City and a Municipal council in Yavatmal district of the Vidarbha region in Indian state of Maharashtra. The Pandharkawada municipality won "Best Municipality at Amravati Division" in 2006 and a quality of education award in 2011. It is near the Saikheda Dam, an earthfill dam on the Khuni River..

== Agriculture ==
=== Kharip Crops ===
Jowar, Cotton, Groundnut and rice are the major kharip crops.

Jowar – grows in talukas such as Pusad, Ner, Mahagaon, Umarkhed, Maregaon, Ghatanji, Wani and Zari Jamni.

Cotton – major talukas are Ghatanji, Wani, Pusad, Umarkhed, Mahagaon and Ner.

Groundnut - talukas such as Pusad, Digras, Darwha, Arni, Ghatanji etc.

=== Rabi Crops ===
Wheat and gram are the important crops. Rabi sesame and linseed (Jawas) are grown along with these crops.

Wheat – talukas lying in river basins of Wardha and Painganga. Umarkhed, Pusad, Wani, Digras, Maregaon and Zari Jamni are the largest. Talukas such as Arni, Ghatanji and Yavatmal also take this crop.

Gram – talukas such as Umarkhed, Wani, Ralegaon, Maregaon, Pusad, Digras, Ghatanji and Babhulgaon.

=== Irrigated crops ===
Sugarcane, bananas, Oranges, Grapes and betel leaves are important irrigated crops.

Sugar cane – Pusad, Umarkhed and Mahagaon talukas

Bananas and oranges – Zadgaon, Ralegaon, Kalamb and Dabha-Pahur regions

Grapes – Pusad and Umarkhed region

Betel leaves - Lalkhed, Darwha, Digras and Umarkhed region

== Demographics ==
As of 2001 India census, Pandharkawada had a population of 26,567. Males constitute 51% of the population and females 49%. Pandharkawada has an average literacy rate of 74%, significantly higher than the national average of 59.5%. Male literacy is at 80%, while female literacy is 68%. In Pandharkawada, 13% of the population is under age 6.

Year	Male	Female	Total Population	Change	Religion (%)							
Year	Male	Female	Total Population	Change	Hindu	Muslim	Christian	Sikhs	Buddhist	Jain	Other religions and persuasions	Religion not stated
2001	13,613	12,959	26,572	-	74.616	18.745	0.181	0.467	3.793	0.884	1.291	0.023
2011	15,681	15,413	31,094	17̥%	75.622	18.991	0.154	0.322	4.039	0.746	0.090	0.035

== Transport ==
Pandharkawada is located on National Highway 7 on Nagpur-Hyderabad section. MSRTC buses connect the city to Nagpur, Ghatanji, Yavatmal, Chandrapur, Amravati, Akola, Nanded, Aurangabad, Adilabad, Pune and Hyderabad.

== Geography ==
Dense forests are found in Pandharkawada. Tipeshwar is one of the two wildlife sanctuaries in the city and the most well-known forest of the district. Trees such as teak, bamboo, tendu, hirda, apta and moha live in the forests. Tiger, bear, deer, nilgai, sambar, hyena and the national bird, the peacock, are found in the forests. A suspected man eating tigress, with 13 victims attributed was active in this area in Oct/Nov 2018 and was shot dead on November 2, 2018.
