= Rango Bapuji Gupte =

Rango Bāpuji Gupte (??? – Missing 5 July 1857) born into a marathi "Chandraseniya Kayastha Prabhu" family was an Indian diplomat, freedom fighter, and a revolutionary.

The rulers at Satara were one of the last independent branches of the Maratha Empire. After the British dissolved the state in 1839, ruler Pratapsinh sent Rango Bapuji Gupte to England to defend the case in front of the British Parliament. He stayed there for 14 years without much success.

After returning to India, he became "one of the masterminds behind the 1857 revolt", known as the Indian Rebellion of 1857. He met Nanasaheb Peshwe and Tatya Tope and started building armed organizations in Satara, Kolhapur, Sangli, and Belgaon. However, when his plan was exposed, many of the fighters he had recruited were killed and Gupte went underground. In 1857, he went to Thane to attend a religious ceremony at his relative Prabhakar Viththal Gupte's residence near Jambhali Naka. When British police arrived to arrest him, Gupte escaped in the disguise of an old woman and was never found again. In his memory the Jambhali Naka has been named as Rango Bapuji Chowk.

It is said that Gupte lived incognito in the Darwha town in Yavatmal district of Maharashtra. A memorial named 'Char Bhinti' in Satara honors Rango Bapuji Gupte.
