= Arni, Maharashtra =

Arni
- town
- Nickname: Green City
- Location in Maharashtra, India
- Coordinates: 20°07′40″N 77°55′39″E
- Country: India
- State: Maharashtra
- District: Yavatmal

Government
  - Type: Municipal Council
  - Body: Arni Municipal Council
  - Member of Legislative Assembly(Maharashtra): Sandip Dhurve (BJP)
  - Member of Legislative Council (Maharashtra): Khwaja Baig, (NCP)
  - Member of Parliament (India): Baalu Dhanorkar, (INC)

Population (2011)
  - Total: 161,833

Languages
  - Official: Marathi
- Time zone: UTC+5:30 (IST)
- PIN: 445103
- Telephone code: 07234
- Vehicle registration: MH-29 (Yavatmal)

Arni is a town with (Administrative Division) & tehsil in Yavatmal district of Maharashtra State in India. It is situated on the banks of the Arunavati River. It Connected with National Highway-361. Nearest Railway Station is a Dhamangaon which is located 90 km approx & Nearest Airport is a Dr.Babasaheb Ambedkar International Airport, Nagpur is around 187 km from Arni.

== Administration ==
Arni (Vidhan Sabha constituency) is one of the 288 constituencies of the Maharashtra Legislative Assembly (Vidhan Sabha) and one of the seven which are located in Yavatmal district. Political positions in the region are reserved for Scheduled Tribe candidates.

It is a part of Chandrapur Parliamentary (Lok Sabha) constituency with the adjoining Chandrapur district along with five other Vidhan Sabha assembly constituencies: Rajura (SC), Chandrapur (SC), Ballarpur and Warora from Chandrapur district, and Wani from Yavatmal district.

Marathi is the official language.

== Economy ==
Arni city is well known for cotton production.its adjoining villages have large quantity of Soyabean and cotton cropping farms. It also has big grain market & there are 3 sub grain markets & also one private grain market.

it is one of the biggest local market in the district after yavatmal. In a city there are 5 Cotton ginnings & Pressing mills, 2 Peanut Mills & 1 Dal Mill.

Food grains including wheat, jowar (sorghum), pulses, and groundnuts are currently in high demand in the market. The market is supplied with plenty of grains from nearby villages such as Jawala, Sawali, Lonbehel and cities like Yavatmal, Akola, Amravati, Nagpur, Aurangabad & all over India.

== Education ==
Arni is a major centre for education, being well equipped with school and colleges. These include:

- Govt ITI (Industrial Training Institute) Vocational Training Institute
- Giri's Kidzee Pre'school
- Mount litera zee school(CBSE)
- L.U.D.E.M. School Arni
- S.M.D. Bharati high school
- S.M.D. Bharti girls high school
- S.M.D. Bharti Jr. College of Science, Commerce & Arts
- S.M.D. Bharti Senior college of Arts, science and commerce
- Hazrat Baba Kambalposh Urdu high school
- Hafiz Baig Urdu Jr. College
- Shahid Bhagatsingh high school
- Shahid Bhagatsingh Jr. College of Science
- Devrao Patil Shinde Jr. College
- Devrao Patil Girls school
- Narayanleela English Medium School
- Sunrise nursery and convent
- Prabhakiran English Medium Primary School
- Swami Vivekanand Digital School
- Radhakrushna Primary School
- Saishwari Primary School

== Religion ==
Baba Kambalposh Dargah Sharif and Mahadev Mandir is situated at the bank of Arunavati river (the name Arni came from Arunavati river).

In a taluka many other temple's in Villages like Dabhadi (Which is famous for being one of the ancient Places of shivlinga and Mahadev temple), Deurwadi, Antargaon & many other Villages. Shree Mahadev temlpebeside Arunavati river near Baba Kambalposh tomb.

The annual Urs festival of the Sufi saint Baba Kambalposh is very famous within Maharashtra; it is celebrated annually in Arni between the 5th and 10 February. Shankar pat (bull racing) used to be one of the main attractions of the festival, in which around 200 villagers (each with their own pair of bulls) would participate for a prestigious prize. However, this practice has now has been stopped by an act of government.

Mahur, a town famous for Renuka Devi temple and few other temples situated on the giant hills. It is also said that during the exile, the pandavas stayed here in the caves and forests. It has religious significance for Hindus, and is situated 33 km from the city of Arni with good connectivity of private and public transport.
