= Vasant Purushottam Kale =

Prominent marathi author

- Born: 25 March 1932; Mumbai, Maharashtra
- Died: 26 June 2001 (aged 69); Mumbai, Maharashtra, India
- Occupations: Writer, essayist, novelist, architect
- Notable work: Partner, Vapurza, Hi Waat Ekatichi, and Thikri
- Father: Purshottam Kale

Vasant Purushottam Kale, popularly known as Va Pu, was a Marathi writer. He wrote more than 60 books. His well-known works include Partner, Vapurza, Hi Waat Ekatichi, and Thikri. He was a famous story-teller and had over 1600 stage-shows in the theatres. He was the first writer to come in form of audio cassettes.He also played violin and harmonium. He was also fond of photography.

He has also written so many story collection books which include "Sakhi", "Taptapadi", "One for the road" etc. which are praised by the readers for being relatable.

Kale was an architect by profession.

He died of heart failure on 26 June 2001 at his home in Mumbai.

== Books ==
- Aik sakhe
- Amitabh ani me
- Apan Saare Arjun
- Badali
- Bai Bayako Aani Calendar
- Bhade
- Bhul Bhulyia
- Chaturbhuj
- Chakkar
- Cheers
- Dost
- Donde
- Duniya Tula Visrel - Lecture on Wasudev Waman Patankar
- Ekmek
- Fantasy Ek Preyasy
- Gheneration GAP
- Ghar Harawaleli Manse
- Goshta hatatali hoti
- Goph
- Gulmohar
- Hi Waat Ekatichi (Novel-कादंबरी)
- Hunkar
- Intimate
- Japun Tak Paul
- J K Malvankar
- Karmachari
- Ka Re Bhulalasi
- Kahi Khara Kahi Khota
- Katha-kathanachi katha
- Lombkalnari Maanasa
- Mahotsav
- Manasa
- Mayabazar
- Maza mazyapashi
- Mi manus shodhtoy
- Moden pan vaknar nahi
- Nimitta
- Navara Mhanava Aapala
- One for the road
- Partner (Novel - कादंबरी)
- Pleasure Box
- Panpoi
- Premamayee
- Partner
- Rang Manache
- Rang Panchami
- Sakhi
- Sange Vadilanchi Kirti
- Sanvadini
- Swar
- Thikari- ठिकरी(Novel-कादंबरी)
- Taptapadi
- Tu Bhramat Aahasi Vaya( Novel - कादंबरी)
- Va Pu Sange Vadilanchi Kirti
- Valay
- Vapurwai
- Vapurza (a compilation of passages from his earlier work)
- Vapu 85
- Zopala
- Rutu Basanti Rooth Gayee
