= Ner, Yavatmal =

Ner Parsopant
- town
- Location in Maharashtra, India
- Coordinates: 20°29′28″N 77°51′58″E
- Country: India
- State: Maharashtra
- District: Yavatmal

Population
  - Total: 34,000
  - Density: 500/km^{2} (1,300/sq mi)

Languages
  - Official: Marathi
- Time zone: UTC+5:30 (IST)
- Postal code: 445102
- Telephone code: 07238-
- Vehicle registration: MH-29
- Coastline: 0 kilometres (0 mi)
- Nearest city: Amravati 61km and Yavatmal 33km
- Lok Sabha constituency: washim-yavatmal
- Climate: mild (Köppen)
- Avg. summer temperature: 45 °C (113 °F)
- Avg. winter temperature: 14 °C (57 °F)

Ner is a census town and tehsil in Darwha subdivision of Yavatmal district in the state of Maharashtra, India. In the 2011 census the population was 45,000.
