= Wasudev Waman Patankar =

Marathi poet and advocate (1908–1997)

Vasudev Patankar a.k.a. Bhausaheb Patankar
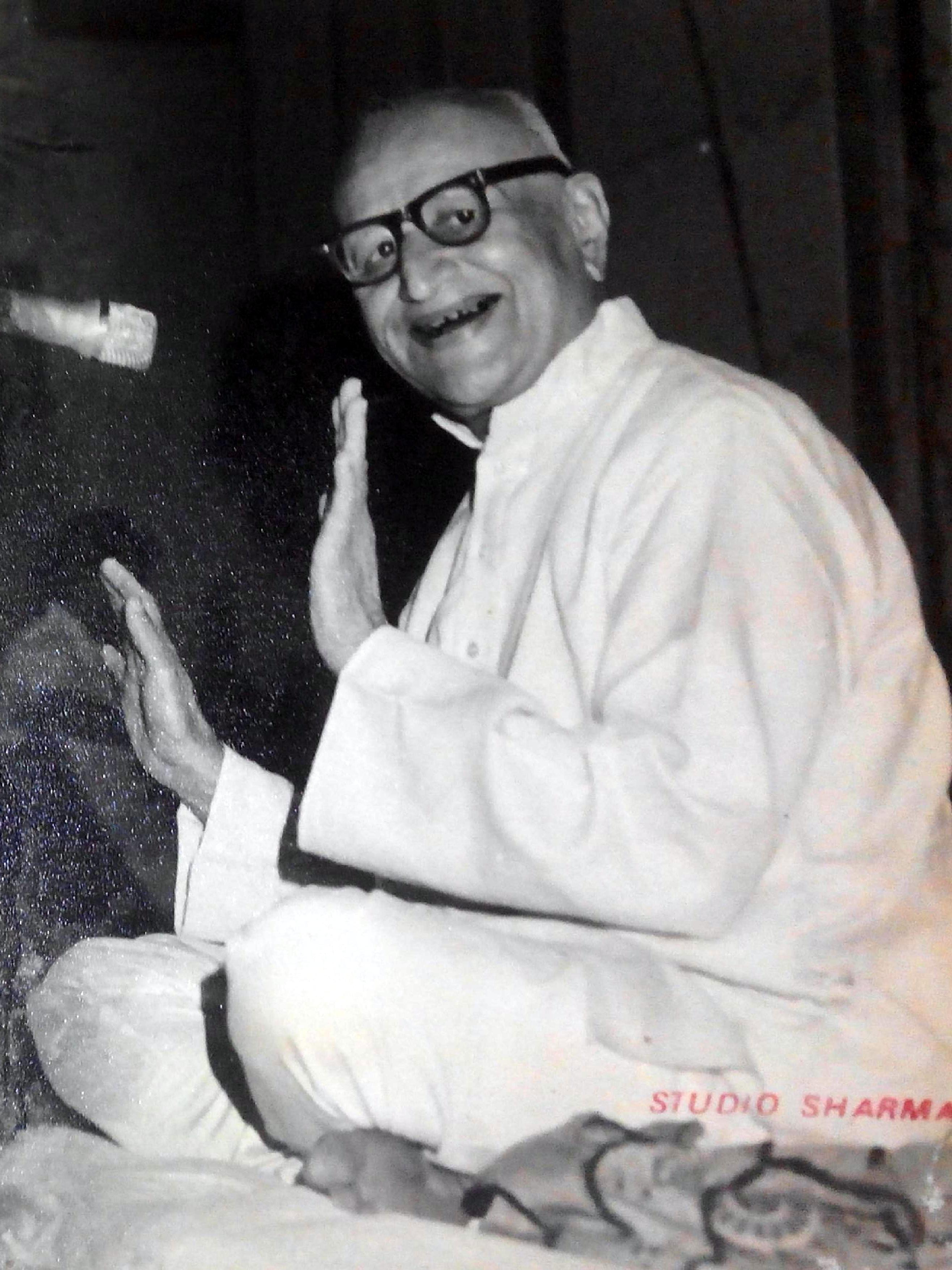
- Born: Vasudev Patankar; 29 December 1908
- Died: 20 June 1997 (aged 88); Yavatmal, Maharashtra, India
- Resting place: Yavatmal
- Education: B.A (1930)-Morris college Nagpur, LLB(1933)-Vidhi Mahavidyalay, Nagpur
- Occupation: Advocate
- Known for: Shayari
- Spouse(s): Indutai Patankar, Kalinditai Patankar
- Children: 5

Wasudev Waman Patankar (29 December 1908 – 20 June 1997), popularly known by the name Bhausaheb Patankar (Marathi: भाऊसाहेब पाटणकर), was a prominent Marathi shayar, and one of the first to pen Marathi shayari literature, which was dominated by the Urdu language. W.W Patankar was a legal advocate by profession.

== Life ==
Bhausaheb was born as Wasudev Waman Patankar on 29 December 1908. Wasudev's father, Waman Patankar, was a school headmaster at Achalpur, Maharashtra. Patankar studied the Vedas, philosophy and other shastras as a shishya under Sitaramshastri Kurumbhatte. In later years he completed his graduation in Arts and Law and worked as a full-time legal advocate at Yavatmal District court from 1933 to 1959. He took hunting lessons from his guru Baburao Naidu. He had a licensed Winchester Model 1895 (hunting cartridge .405 Winchester) rifle and had an official games license, which he used for hunting tigers. He wrote a series of natural observations from his hunting experiences in the Amrut magazine from 1952 to 1956. He retired due to eyesight problems.

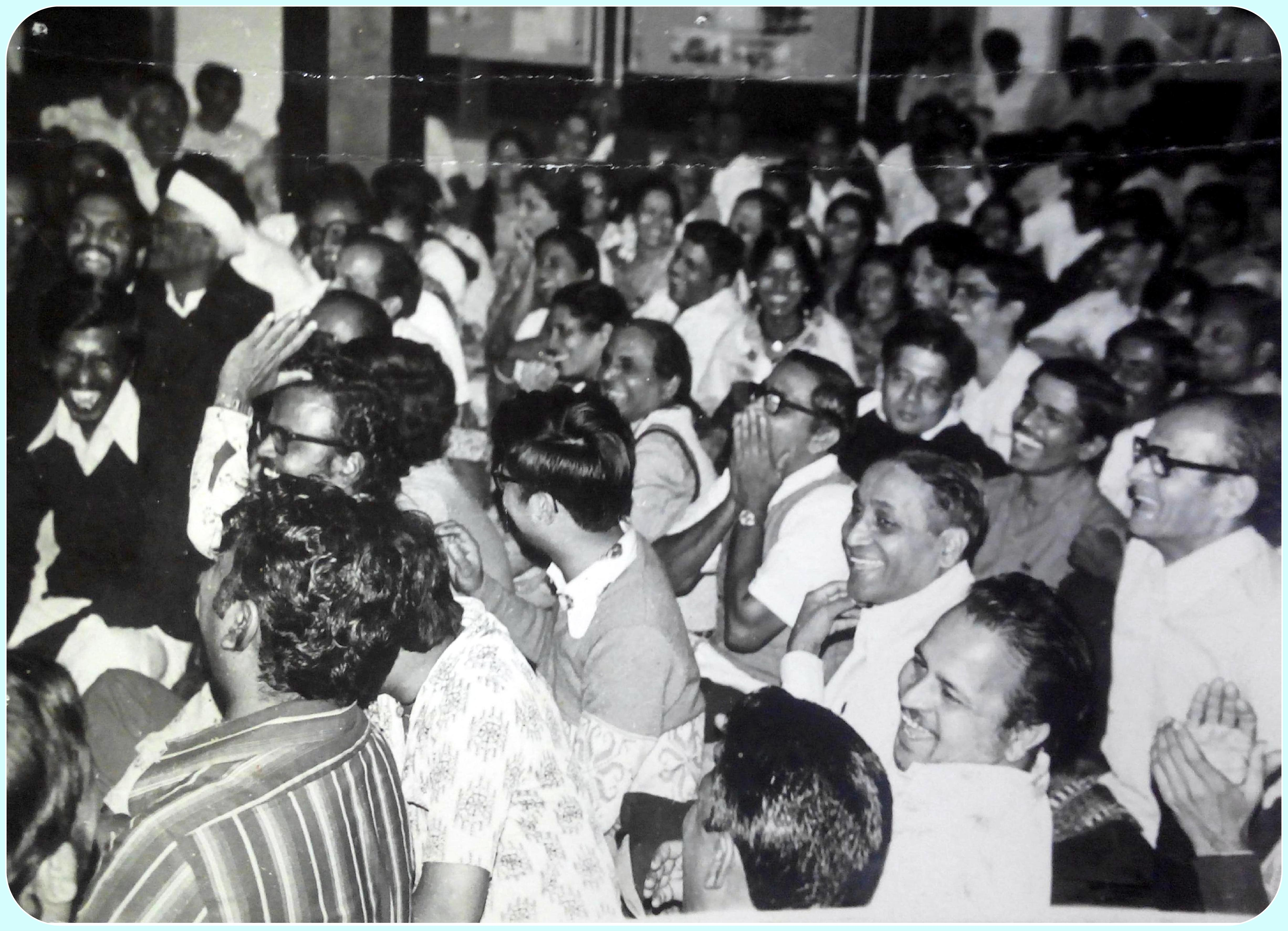
Wah Wah and cheers of the audience was a common scene of his Mushayara

== Marathi Shayari ==
After getting into Urdu shayari, he started writing Marathi shayari at the age of 52. His Marathi shayari in the initial stage was tended to the genres of humour and romance but as he progressed in his career he touched upon various aspects of life and philosophy.

== Awards ==
- Rangat Sangat Pratishthan Puruskar (24 September 1995)
- Shree Sant Namdev puraskar by Swatantra Sainik B.P Bhai Futane Pratishthan Jamkhed (1988)

Late Bhausaheb Patankar Memorial Award given by Rangat Sangat Pratishthan is awarded in recognition to the contribution in the field of shayari.

== Books ==
- Marathi Shayari (1962)
- Marathi Mushayra (1966)
- Mehfil (1975)
- Dost ho (1977)
- Zinda Dil (1980)

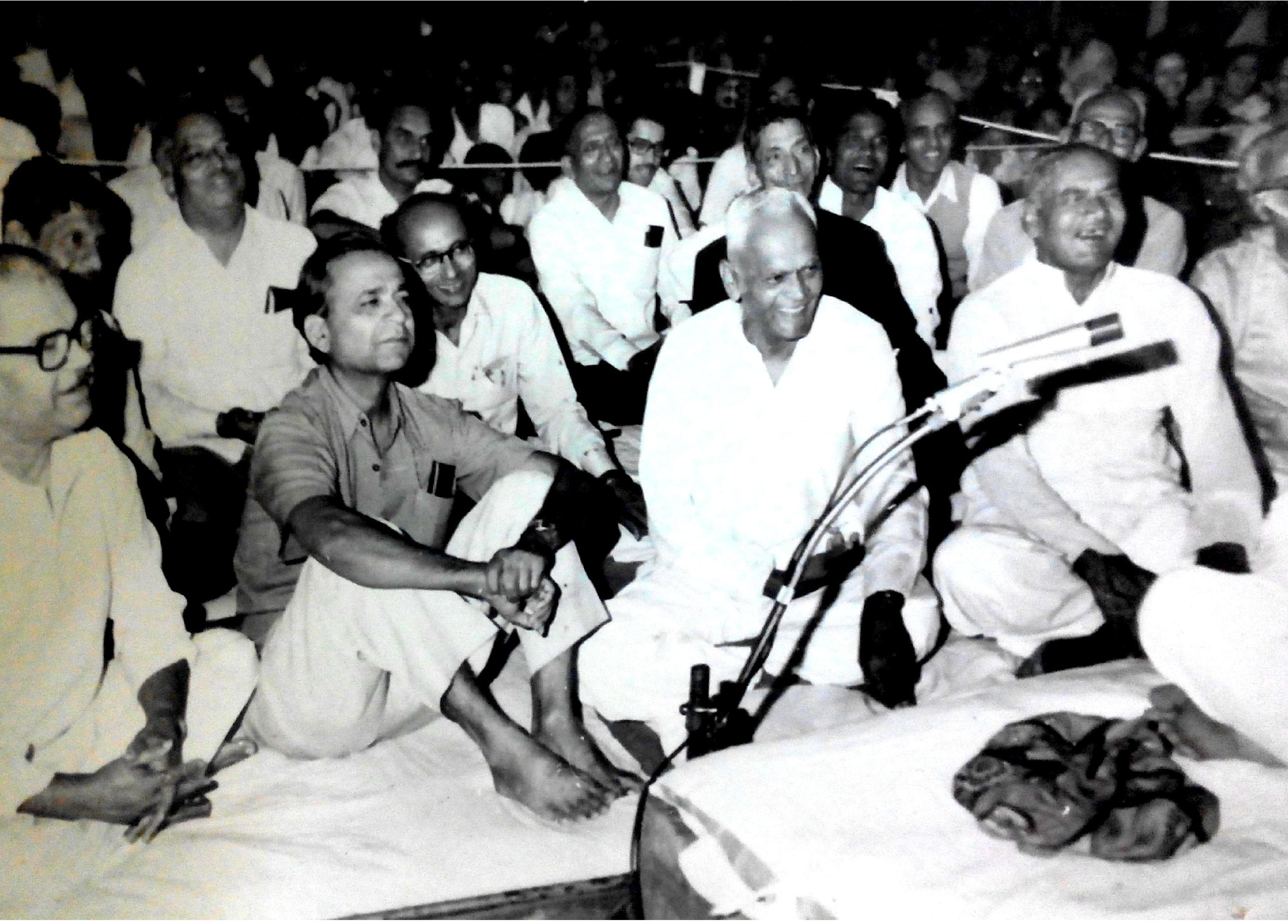
Vasant Purushottam Kale (second from left) can be seen in one of the programmes which celebrated his Marathi shayari.
