= Asegaon, Jintur =

Village in Maharashtra

Asegaon
- Village
- Location in Maharashtra, India Asegaon (India)
- Coordinates: 19.64345°N 76.73804°E
- Country: India
- State: Maharashtra
- District: Parbhani

Government
  - Type: Gram panchayat

Population (2011)
  - Total: 3,812
- Demonym: Asegaonkar

Languages
  - Official: Marathi
- Time zone: UTC+5:30 (IST)
- PIN: 431509
- Telephone code: 02457
- ISO 3166 code: IN-MH
- Vehicle registration: MH-22

Asegaon is a village in Jintur taluka of Parbhani district of Indian state of Maharashtra. It is 27 km away from Parbhani city while it is 26 km away from Jintur. There is a Bhagwati Mata temple near the village which is famous in nearer area .

== Demography ==
As per 2011 census, Asegaon is a village with total 809 families residing. The village has population of 4812 of which 2,951 were males while 1,861 were females.

Average Sex Ratio of village is 954 which is higher than Maharashtra state average of 929.

Literacy rate of Asegaon village was 81% compared to 82.34% of Maharashtra. Male literacy stands at 82% while female literacy rate was 70%.

Schedule Caste (SC) constitutes 11% while Schedule Tribe (ST) were 1.1% of total population in Asegaon village.
