= Ghatanji =

- City
- Location in Maharashtra, India Ghatanji (India)
- Coordinates: 20.13°N 78.32°E
- Country: India
- State: Maharashtra
- District: Yavatmal
- Elevation: 274 m (899 ft)

Population (2001)
  - Total: 19,347

Languages
  - Official: Marathi
- Time zone: UTC+5:30 (IST)
- PIN: 445301
- Telephone code: 91-7230
- Vehicle registration: MH-29

Ghatanji is a very old city and municipal council in Yavatmal district in the state of Maharashtra, India. It is also known as 'Cotton City', because in this area farmer produces a fine quality of cotton. It is also a place of pilgrimage of 'Brahmalin Shree Sant Maroti Maharaj' having Devasthan near the bank of river 'Waghadi'. Every year, in January–February, a fair in the name of 'Brahmalin Shree Sant Maroti Maharaj' takes place at the 'Azad Maidan'. The day on which 'Dahi Handi' is being celebrated, is the main occasion in one month fair.
Ghatanji is a composition of name 'Ghati' and 'Anji', nearby suburbs, and is one of the main towns in Yavatmal District. There is a historical temple of 'Lord Nrusimha' (also called 'Lord Narsimha'), which was built in Hemadpanti architecture (named after 1259-1274 CE prime minister Hemadpant from the court of Seuna Yadavas of Devagiri). People from all the corners of Maharashtra, Andhra Pradesh, Telangana, and other nearby states come here to pay homage."

== Geography ==
There is ample water resource due to river 'Waghadi' and Dam over there. It is having ample forest area, consisting Teak Wood, Nilgiri Trees and many other spices trees. Various types of animals are living in these jungles.

== Education, business and industries ==
Ghatanji has several educational institutes having facilities ranging from nursery education in both English and Marathi Languages up to Graduation in Arts, Commerce and Science. Ghatanji is privileged to have 'Jawahar Navodaya Vidyalaya', being only such school in the Yavatmal district situated at Belora village. There is a college of I.T.I. There are also several Information Technology Institutes. SPM Science And Gilani Arts, Commerce College, Samarth High School & Junior College is also an ideal Educational Institute in Ghatanji.

It is a big market place for the nearby towns and villages. Being 'Cotton City', it has a well established Agriculture Produce Market Committee i.e. 'APMC'. Weekly Cattle market of ghatanji city is also very famous in vidarbha region. Cotton is the main product in agriculture. Agriculture is the primary way and source of living-hood. There are many Ginning and Pressing Factories located in the city and nearby. One of the oldest factory is 'Birla Cotsyn (India) Limited' popularly known as 'Jamod Ginning'.

== Demographics ==
As of 2001 India census, Ghatanji had a population of 19,347. Males constitute 52% of the population and females 48%. Ghatanji has an average literacy rate of 74%, higher than the national average of 59.5%: male literacy is 80%, and female literacy is 68%. In Ghatanji, 12% of the population is under 6 years of age.

Year	Male	Female	Total Population	Change	Religion (%)							
Year	Male	Female	Total Population	Change	Hindu	Muslim	Christian	Sikhs	Buddhist	Jain	Other religions and persuasions	Religion not stated
2001	10150	9197	19347	-	81.940	8.239	0.026	0.031	8.792	0.367	0.507	0.098
2011	11026	10267	21293	0.101	82.337	9.304	0.070	0.042	7.510	0.296	0.019	0.423
