= Kashibai Kanitkar =

Marathi writer

Kashibai Kanitkar (January 20, 1861 – January 30, 1948) was the first major woman writer in Marathi since the 15th century "sant" poet Kanhopatra.

Kashibai was born into a wealthy Brahmin family in the town of Ashte in Sangli District, and according to the social custom of her days, her marriage was arranged at the age of nine to Govind Vasudev Kanitkar (who was seven years older than her).

Kashibai had no formal education, but with her progressive husband's strong encouragement, she learned to read, and gradually mastered many Marathi, Sanskrit, and English works.

John Stuart Mill's The Subjection of Women had a powerful impact on her, and through her prolific and wide-ranging writings — both fiction and non-fiction — she promoted women's emancipation.

The following is a partial list of Kashibai's works:

== Novels ==
- Ranga Rao (रंगराव)
- Palakhicha Gonda (पालखीचा गोंडा)

== Collections of short stories ==
- Shewat Tar Goad Jhala (शेवट तर गोड झाला)
- Chandanyatil Gappa (चांदण्यातील गप्पा)

== Biography ==
- Dr. Anandibai Joshi (डॉक्टर आनंदीबाई जोशी)
