= Korambhi =

Village in Maharashtra

- Village
- Location in Maharashtra, India Korambhi (India)
- Coordinates: 21.1261°N 79.6169°E
- Country: India
- State: Maharashtra
- Region: Vidharba
- District: Bhandara
- Tahsil: Bhandara

Government
  - Type: Gram Panchayat
  - Body: Korambhi Grampanchayat
- Elevation: 288 m (945 ft)

Languages
  - Official: Marathi
- Time zone: UTC+5:30 (IST)
- PIN: 441906
- Telephone code: +917184 ******
- Vehicle registration: MH-36
- Nearest city: Bhandara
- Lok Sabha constituency: Bhandara-Gondiya (Lok Sabha constituency)
- Vidhan Sabha constituency: Bhandara (Vidhan Sabha constituency)

Korambhi is a village in the Bhandara tahsil of Bhandara District of Maharashtra state in India. There is a temple to the Hindu goddess which is situated on the hill of Korambhi. It is a holy place among Hindus. Korambhi is famous for this Temple. The village is situated on the bank of Wainganga River.

According to the 2011 census it has a population of 659 living in 666 households.
