= Maregaon =

Maregaon Margo
- Nagar Panchayat
- Location in Maharashtra, India
- Coordinates: 20°6′0″N 78°49′0″E
- Country: India
- State: Maharashtra
- District: Yavatmal
- Founder: Punaji (Sahukaar- Wegaon)

Government
  - Type: Nagar Panchayat
  - MP: Suresh Narayan Dhanorkar (INC)
  - MLA: Sanjeevreddy Bodkurwar

Area
  - Total: 1.2 km^{2} (0.46 sq mi)
- Elevation: 268 m (879 ft)

Population
  - Total: 78,713
  - Density: 66,000/km^{2} (170,000/sq mi)

Languages
  - Official: Marathi
- Time zone: UTC+5:30 (IST)
- Postal code: 445303
- Vehicle registration: MH-29
- Coastline: 0 kilometres (0 mi)

Maregaon is a town in Wani Subdivision of Yavatmal district in the Indian state of Maharashtra.

Maregaon is a small town which was declared a Nagar Panchayat in 2015 and the elections were held on 1 November 2015. It has 17 wards. Previously known Dr. Ambedkar square is now bifurcated and the new square christened as Dr. A.P.J. Abdul Kalam Chowk. It is located on Wani yavatmal road nearly 18 km from Wani and is a tehsil place.

Major profession is agriculture. It has black cotton soil which is suitable for Cotton and soybean, both important crops in this tehsil. There is Tehasil Kacheri, Panchayat Samiti, Civil Court and other Offices and Banks in Maregaon. Also, there is a Cement factory at 4 km on Mardi road, Dam at Nawargaon, Mines (stone and crusher) at Narsala, Limestone mines at Gourala on Wani road.

It has Science, Commerce and Arts degree College. CBSE schools, D.Ed. College, Pharmacy College, Adarsh High School, Mahatma Jyotiba Phule Vidyalaya and Rashtriya Vidyalaya and Junior College. The place is going to be well developed and has two Ginning and Pressing factories. Vanoja devi temple is located near Mardi and Pandav Devi (Pandhar Devi) temple on Maregaon-Karanji road approximately 11 km. It has regularly Tuesday Bazaar-haat behind Z.P. Primary School. The population of tehsil mostly comprises tribals comprising Gond and Kolam tribes in nearby villages. The tehsil has been bifurcate to form another tehsil "Zari-Jamani". New coal mines has been discovered in recent times in this area and this could help to improve the economy of the area.

== Villages in Maregaon Tahsil ==
Sl.No.	Village Name	Village Code
1	Akapur	544774
2	Ambora	543719
3	Apati	543758
4	Arjuni	543806
5	Asan	543810
6	Awalgaon	543724
7	Bamarda	543755
8	Bhalewadi	543780
9	Bodad	543751
10	Bori Kh	543767
11	Bori-bk.	543697
12	Buranda	543721
13	Chanoda	543741
14	Chargaon	543759
15	Chinchala	543778
16	Chinchmandal	543738
17	Chinchoni Botoni	543720
18	Chopan	543749
19	Dandgaon	543746
20	Dapora	543737
21	Dewala	543765
22	Dhamani	543710
23	Dhanora	543736
24	Dhanpur	543793
25	Dol.Dongargaon	543773
26	Dongargaon	543764
27	Dorli	543796
28	Durgada	543726
29	Gadegaon	543740
30	Gawarala	543784
31	Ghoddara	543712
32	Ghoguldara	543715
33	Girjapur (Vangram)	543733
34	Godani	543807
35	GondBuranda	543709
36	Goraj	543757
37	Hatwanjari	543792
38	Hiwara-Majara	543747
39	Hiwari	543801
40	Indiragram	543706
41	Jaglon	543808
42	Jalaka	543717
43	Kanada	543748
44	Kanhalgaon	543787
45	Kanhalgaon	543769
46	Kanhalgaon	543725
47	Karanwadi	543789
48	Kegaon	543739
49	Kegaon	543800
50	Khadaki	543790
51	Khadaki (Vangram)	543772
52	Khairgaon	543752
53	Khairgaon	543723
54	Khandani	543730
55	Khapari	543791
56	Khekadwai	543713
57	Kilona	543811
58	Kinhala	543770
59	Kolgaon	543797
60	Kosara	543735
61	Kothurla	543699
62	Krishnapur	543698
63	Kumbha	543704
64	Lakhapur	543775
65	Machhindra	543761
66	Madanapar	543768
67	Mahagaon	543708
68	Majara	543750
69	Mangali	543702
70	Mangarul	543785
71	Mardi	543754
72	Maregaon	543786
73	Maregaon (Vangram)	543731
74	Mendhani	543729
75	Mhais Dodaka	543794
76	Mukata	543745
77	Narsala	543711
78	Nawargaon	543795
79	Net	543783
80	Pahapal	543766
81	Pandawihir	543716
82	Pandhardevi (Vangram)	543718
83	Pandharkawada	543777
84	Pardi	543742
85	Pathari	543779
86	Pendhari	543804
87	Phefarwada	543756
88	Phiski (Vangram)	543763
89	Pimprad (Vangram)	543762
90	Pisgaon	543776
91	Raipur	543805
92	Rameshwar	543700
93	Rohpat	543803
94	Saganapur	543802
95	Sakhara	543707
96	Salebhatti	543781
97	Sarati	543722
98	Sawangi	543734
99	Shivani Dhobi	543743
100	Shivnala	543714
101	Shrirampur	543705
102	Sindi	543701
103	Takalkheda	543788
104	Takli	543703
105	Tukapur	543753
106	Uchatdevi (Vangram)	543732
107	Umarghat	543809
108	Vasantnagar	543727
109	Wadgaon	543771
110	Wadgaon (Waghade)	543798
111	Wagdara	543728
112	Wanoja	543760
113	Warud	543782
114	Wegaon	543799
115	Zagada	543744

sakhara

== Population ==
According to the Census 2011 the total population of Maregaon is 78,713. The following table shows:

Total Population	Population (0-6 yrs)	SC Population	ST Population	Literate Population	Sex Ratio (Over All)	Sex Ratio (0-6 yrs)	Literacy Rate
78,713	8,402	4,009	26,289	57,854	963	965	73.50
