= Durgada, Wardha district =

Village in Maharashtra

Durgada
- Village
- Location in Maharashtra, India
- Coordinates: 20°36′31″N 78°22′53″E
- Country: India
- State: Maharashtra
- District: Wardha
- Tahsil: Deoli

Area
  - Total: 3.29 km^{2} (1.27 sq mi)

Population (2011)
  - Total: 609
  - Density: 185/km^{2} (479/sq mi)

Languages
  - Official: Marathi
- Time zone: UTC+5:30 (IST)
- PIN: 442306

Durgada is a rural village in Deoli tahsil, Wardha district, Maharashtra, India.

== Demographics ==
As of the census of 2011, there were 609 people residing in the village. The population density was 190 people per square kilometer (490 people/mi^{2}). There were 181 households within the village. Males constitute 50.5% of the population and females 49.5%. Durgada has an average literacy rate of 74.4%, slightly higher than the national average of 74%. Male literacy is at 40.1%, while female literacy is 34.3%. In Durgada, 9.3% of the population is age 6 or under.
