= Natyachhatakar Diwakar =

Marathi writer

Shankar Kashinath Garge
- Born: Shankar Govindrao Diwakar; 18 January 1889; Pune, Bombay Presidency, British India
- Died: 1 October 1931 (aged 42); Pune, India
- Other names: Diwakar, Shankar Kashinath Garge
- Education: School Final, 1908
- Occupations: Clerk, teacher at Nutan Marathi Vidyalaya 1915–1931, writer. researcher
- Known for: Natyachhata, a kind of dramatic monologues

Shankar Kashinath Garge more popularly known as Natyachhatakar Diwakar (18 January 1889 – 1 October 1931) was a Marathi writer whose mastery of the Natyachhata, a kind of dramatic monologue made him the only major Marathi writer to have used this literary form very successfully. He was born in Pune, Bombay Presidency.

== Career ==
He also wrote plays, short stories. He was particularly influenced by the writings of Robert Browning, William Wordsworth, William Shakespeare.

He did pioneering work in researching poems of a leading modern Marathi poet Keshavasuta.

He was a favourite writer of a few leading Marathi writers like Durga Bhagwat, Vijay Tendulkar, Sadanand Rege.

Ms. Bhagwat praises him in a book based on her long interviews. Mr. Tendulkar edited a book of Diwakar's Natyachhata's.
