= Ralegaon =

- town
- Location in Maharashtra, India
- Coordinates: 20°25′0″N 78°31′00″E
- Country: India
- State: Maharashtra
- District: Yavatmal
- Established: 1982

Government
  - Type: Nagar Panchayat
- Elevation: 248 m (814 ft)

Population (2011)
  - Total: 13,766

Languages
  - Official: Marathi
- Time zone: UTC+5:30 (IST)
- PIN: 445402
- Telephone code: 07202
- Vehicle registration: MH-29
- Nearest city: Yavatmal
- Lok Sabha constituency: Yavatmal-Washim
- Vidhan Sabha constituency: Ralegon

Ralegaon is Tehsil place town in Yavatmal District of Maharashtra (India). It is located in Vidarbha region of Maharashra. Geographically it is located northwest from Yavatmal. It is located 42 km away from Yavatmal and 21 km away from the Kalamb which is on Nagpur-Yavatmal road. And just 41 km from city Wardha.

This is a border taluka between Yavatmal district and Wardha District.

This town is special in production of cotton and also in soya bean and other pulses. It is also known as the cotton capital of Maharashtra. There are more than 10 ginning and pressings in this taluka and one raw oil mill. It also has a S.T. depot.

Formerly this town was part of Pandharkawada Taluka in Yavatmal district and then it became Taluka .

== Demographics ==
As of 2011 India census, Ralegaon had a population of 13,766. Males constitute about 51.23% of the population and females about 48.77%.

This is the taluka headquarters in Yavatmal district and has various saw mills. It also has Ginning and Pressing Mills. H.P industries is the biggest Ginning and pressing mill in ralegaon. it has a production house of 40000 bails per year. It is also one of the adivasi (Scheduled Tribe) tehsil in Maharashtra. MLA seat of this Taluka reserved for Scheduled Tribe community candidate.

== Transport ==
This town is connected via only State Transport(S.T) bus. S.T. having depot at Ralegaon. Buses for Yavatmal, Amravati, Nagpur, Nanded, Wardha, Amravati, Chandrapur runs from Ralegaon. Nearest railway station is Wardha & Dhamangaon. Nearest airport are Nagpur and Nanded.

== Languages ==
Marathi, Gondi, Banjara are most commonly spoken languages in this Taluka.

== Climate ==
As per normal vidarbha, this town is also very hot during summer. During Summer temperature from 40 -45 °C and during winter and rainy season maximum up to 30 °C.

== See also ==
- Ralegaon (Vidhan Sabha constituency)
