= Alind Naidu =

Indian cricketer (born 1983)

Personal information
- Full name: Alind shriniwas naidu
- Born: 11 October 1983 (age 42); Yavatmal, Maharashtra
- Batting: Right-handed
- Bowling: Right-arm offbreak
- Role: All-rounder

Domestic team information
- Years: Team
- 1999-2010: Vidarbha
- Source: ESPNcricinfo, 25 April 2016

Alind Shriniwas Naidu (born 11 October 1983) is an Indian cricketer who plays for Vidarbha. He is right-hand batsman who can bowls right-arm offbreak balls. He was born at Yavatmal.
