= Kalamb, Yavatmal =

Village in Maharashtra

Kalamb
- Town
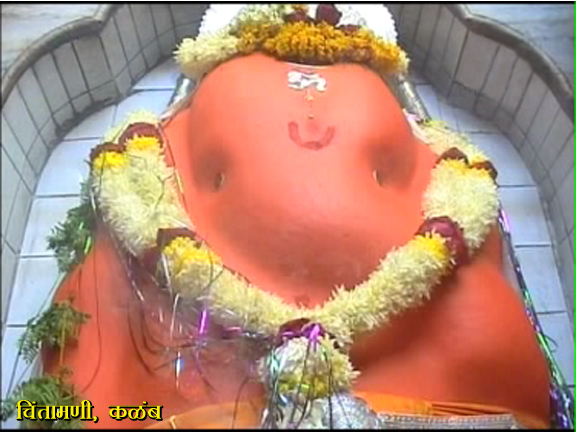
- Shree Chintamani of Kalamb

- Location in Maharashtra, India Kalamb (India)
- Coordinates: 20°26′40″N 78°19′32″E
- Country: India
- State: Maharashtra
- District: Yavatmal

Government
  - Type: Nagar panchayat
  - Body: Nagar panchayat kalamb

Area
  - Total: 20 km^{2} (7.7 sq mi)

Population (2011)
  - Total: 25,000
  - Density: 1,200/km^{2} (3,200/sq mi)

Language
  - Official: Marathi
- Time zone: UTC+5:30 (IST)
- PIN: 445401
- Telephone code: 07201
- Vehicle registration: MH-29
- Lok Sabha constituency: Yavatmal-Washim
- Vidhan Sabha constituency: Ralegaon

Kalamb is a town in the Yavatmal district of Maharashtra state in India. It is famous for its temple devoted to the Hindu god Ganesha, and Muslim scholar Baba Basuri Wale.

== Landmarks ==
Kalamb's temple is known as Shree Chintamani Temple, based on another name for Ganesh that emphasizes the belief that praying to him can remove worries ('Chinta' means worry in Sanskrit and in local Marathi language). It belongs to Vidarbha Ashtavinayak, one of the eight Ganapati kshetras in Vidarbha. It is one of the 21 kshetras of Ganesh throughout India. An annual fair of Shree Chintamani is held here.

== Geography ==
The Chakravati River flows through Kalamb city. It has an average elevation of 283 metres.

== History ==
According to shree ganeshpurn and mudgal puran, shree kumar sahita indradeva is having curse. In order to get rid of the curse of Gautama Rishi, on the advice of the Tridevs, Indradev surrendered to Gautama Rishi and asked for the way to get rid of this curse. As get rid of the curse of Gautama Rishi to be anointed by indradev. Shri Ganesha was happy to see Indradev's long penance and there Shri Ganesha appeared and Indradev was sitting facing north due to which Shri Ganesha appeared as South Mukhi. There are many Ganesha temples in the world But south facing Sri Ganesha is the only Sri Kadamba Kshetra shree ganesha lord. (Kalamb, Dist. Yavatmal). So, shree Chintamani is especially important. The south-facing deity has only Vayusuta, tridev's wisdom, strength and intelligence are famous in the tribhavana, so those who worship and anoint him, Sri Chintamani being south-facing, He is intelligent, shrewd and is believed to have more power than others to fulfill the wishes of devotees. Seeing Sri Chintamanis in front of him, Indra was pleased and prostrated to him. Seeing his expression, Indradev was freed from the curse. When Indradev asked for water to anoint Shri Chintamani Lord Ganesha created Ganesh Kund by striking his own Ankush (weapon). After that, Indradev challenged Mother Ganga and anointed her with Ganga water and he anointed with Ganga water and after that Indradeva begged Sri Chintamani, knowing that Kali Yuga was coming, he promised to stay here permanently for Janakallyan. Mother Ganga also merged in the shree ganesh kunda and promised that I will continue to manifest here after every ten - twelve years and continue to bless the devotees. (1919, 1933, 1948, 1958, 1970, 1983, 1995, 2008, & 2021, came in the period.

The village was an important revenue assessment center under the Mughal Empire in early seventeenth century as the capital of a Sarkar (sub-unit of a Mughal Subah) of the same name, earlier spelled as 'Kalam'.

== Demographics ==
Kalamb is administrative center of a Taluka (sub-district) also called Kalamb. The Taluka had a population of about 103 thousand in 2011, and consisted of 143 villages. It is part of the Vidarbha region. As of 2011, 86.78% of the population was Hindu, 8.89% was Buddhist, and 3.69% was Muslim, with all other religious minorities making up less than 1% of the population.

== Transportation ==
Kalamb is on the Yavatmal-Nagpur highway. The nearest railway station is Dhamangaon and Wardha which is on the Mumbai-Nagpur Expressway.

A New Kalamb Railway Station is being under Constructed on New Braud Gauge Wardha Yavatmal Nanded line.The Station is 3 km Away from Kalamb near Kamathwada.
