= Darwha =

- city
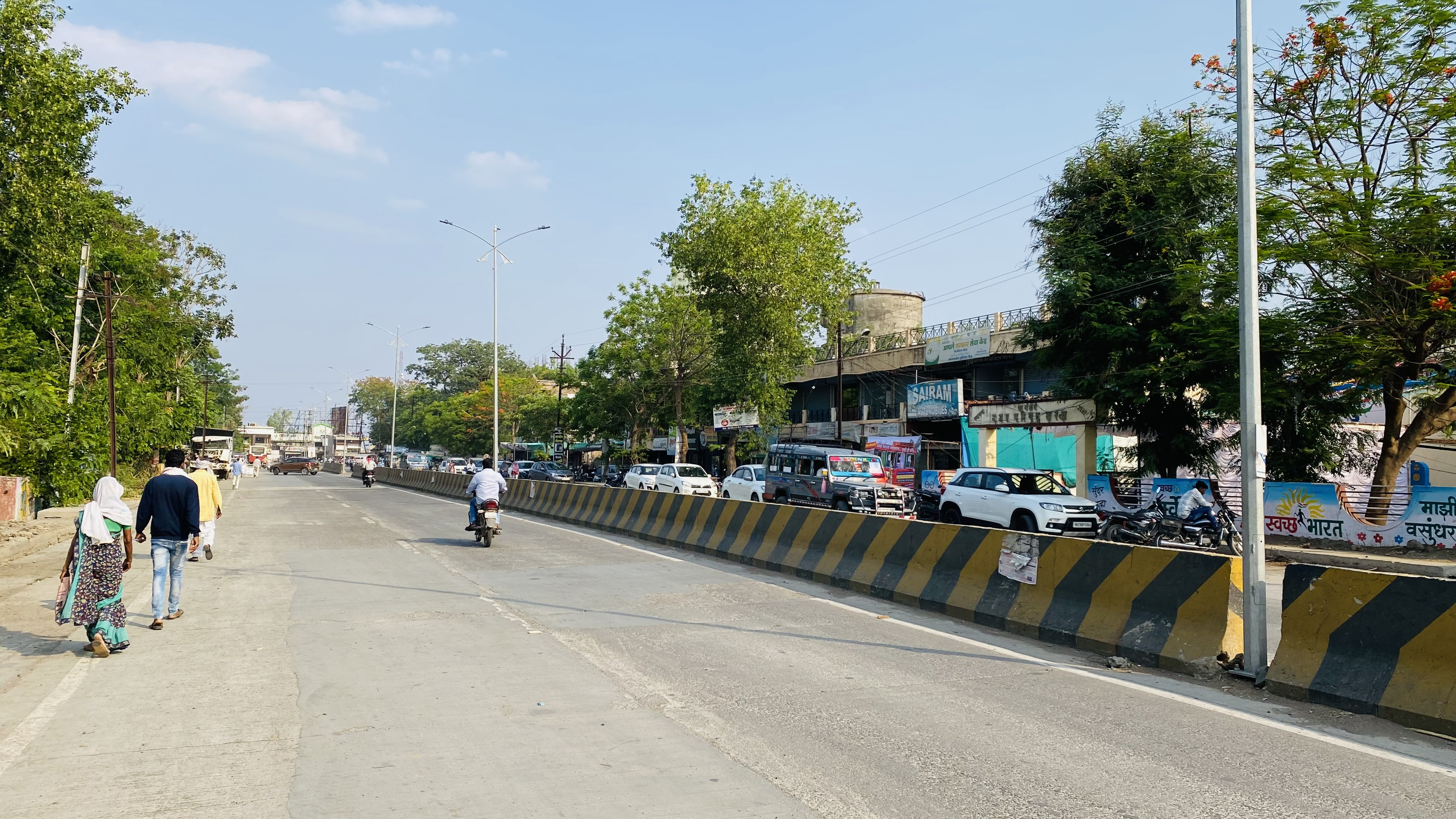
- Nickname: Motibag
- Location in Maharashtra, India
- Coordinates: 20.32°N 77.77°E
- Country: India
- State: Maharashtra
- District: Yavatmal
- Founder: Maharshi Darwhi
- Named for: Darwhi Rishi
- Elevation: 355 m (1,165 ft)

Population (2011)
  - Total: 34,094
- Demonym: Darwhakar

Languages MARATHI
  - Official: Marathi
- Time zone: UTC+5:30 (IST)
- Postal code: 445202

Darwha is a town and a municipal council in Yavatmal district in the state of Maharashtra, India.

== History ==
Locals believe Rango Bapuji Gupte, a freedom fighter had lived incognito in the town. The town is also famous for 'Golibar Chowk', square where British soldiers supposedly opened fire on an unarmed gathering.

If one looks for the history of Darwha city, it was one of the big market places during the period of 1800 AD to 1900 AD for peanut oil and cotton, there were about 8 nos. ginning and about 200 "Tel Ghanies" were there. During the era of "Satvahan", Darwha was well known market place for cattle, dairy products and cotton and cotton seeds.

== Temples ==
Darwha is also known for its temples:

- Mungsaji Maharaj temple :- Mungsaji Maharaj temple is located in Dhamangaon dev.
- Ambadevi Temple is located in older part of town and resembles the temple of goddess Amba in Amaravati.
- Eid gah is located near the railway station.
- Mallikarjun Temple is the most ancient temple in town of lord Shiva and is located on the outside of town.
- Chintamani Temple of lord Ganesha is located at Yavatamal road 3 km from the town.
- An old 'math', a hermitage for renunciants (Sannyasis), is located on Pusad road.
- Sevadas Nagar (Uchegaon) is located on Arni Road is also famous for temple of Sevalal Maharaj, saint of the Banjara community.

The seven-day 'Saptah' is organized here annually from 14 Jan to 20 Jan.

== Demographics ==
As of 2001 India census, Darwha had a population of 23,360. Males constitute 52% of the population and females 48%. Darwha has an average literacy rate of 80%, higher than the national average of 59.5%: male literacy is 83% and female literacy is 76%. In Darwha, 13% of the population is under 6 years of age.

== Places to visit ==
Ganesh Temple is a famous holy place in Darwha, said to have been constructed by Lord Krishna. It is situated in the city, Shri Mungasaji Maharaj Devasthan Dhamangown (Dev)

Mallikarjun Mandir is an old Lord Shiva temple where a big fair is organized during "Mahashivratri" and various rituals take place for worshipping Lord Shiva.

A big Ambamata Mandir is also there where during Navratri time Garba Celebration takes place. Awadhut Maharaj temple at Hatola is an attraction for devotees. Annual fair (Jatra) is organised during Navratri.

There is on old math called Bairagi Baba Math on Digras road about 2 km from Darwha city. It was established by a great freedom fighter Mr. Rango Bapuji Gupte. He renounced active freedom fighting when he was in hiding from British rulers and took solace in the beauty of this place. The Math has sis grave (Samadhi).

== Education ==
Darwha has municipal schools as well as private schools. Apart from primary and secondary schools, Darwha has junior colleges for art, science and commerce. It is also home to ITI college, pharmacy college, agriculture and BEd/DEd colleges.

Prominent educational institutes are:

- College of Agriculture, Darwha
- Little Bird's English Medium School [Top English School]
- Navsanjivan Shikshan Mandal's College of Pharmacy
- Mungasaji Maharaj Mahavidyalaya
- Mungsaji Maharaj College Of Physical Education
- Shri Shivaji High School and Junior College (of Science)
- Shivaji Rao Moghe Urdu Junior College of Science
- Zilla Parishad Urdu Junior College of Arts
- Hazrat Aaish Urdu D.Ed. College
- Millat English High-School
- Aided High School. *Nagar Parishad upper primary and secondary school No. 2, Darwha
- Al-Amin Muslim Welfare Education Society Darwha's Urdu Study center.

== Transport ==
Darwha is well connected to nearby towns like Yavatmal, Amaravati, Nanded and Pusad by road. It also falls on the Shakuntala Express route. The train station is known as Darwha Motibag railway station. Shakuntala Express was founded by the British government when they ruled India. Due to its age, it has gained historical importance.

== Notable people ==
- Mukesh Choudhary
