= Yavatmal district =

Coordinates: 20.1°N 78.2°E

- District of Maharashtra
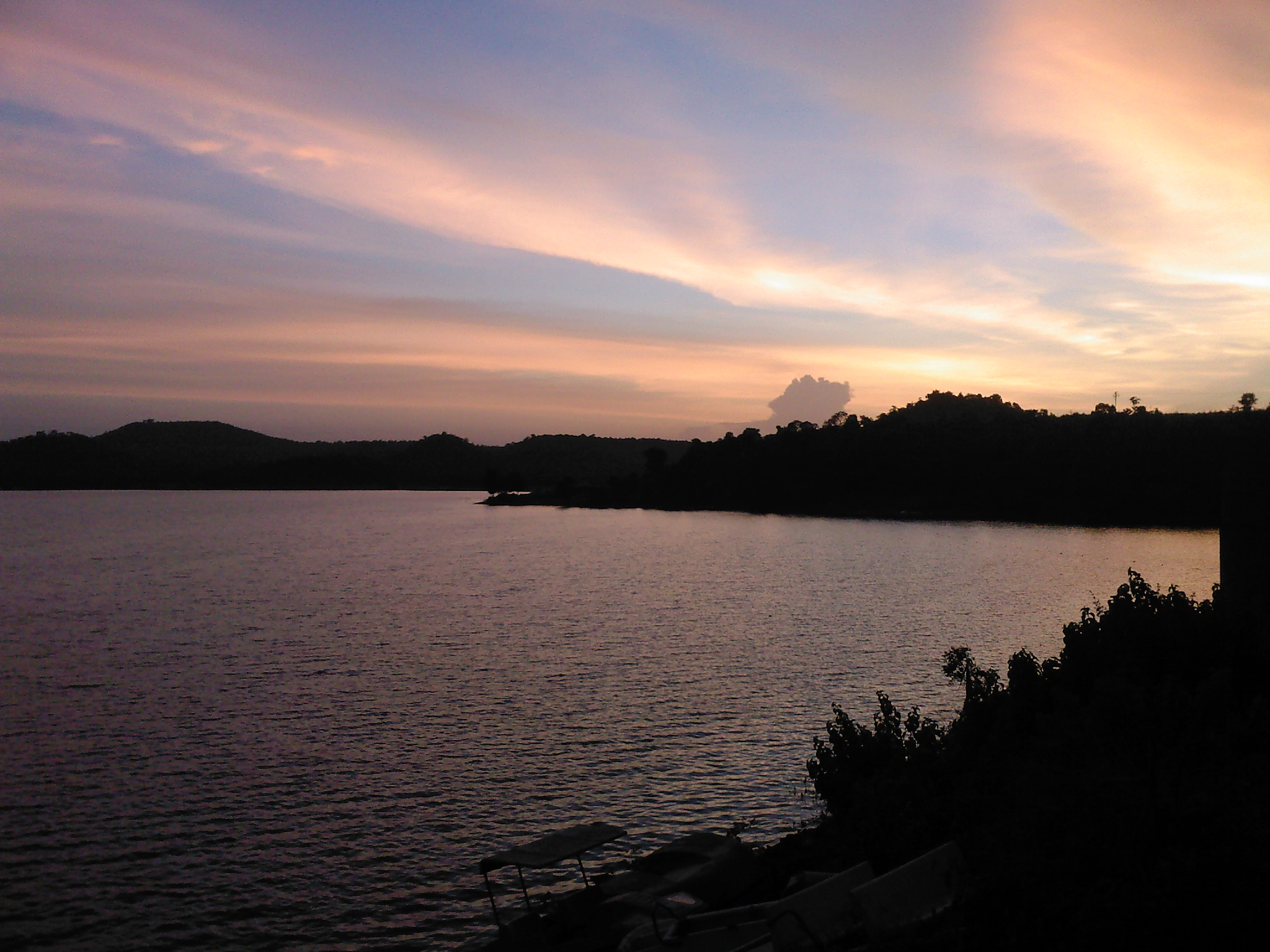
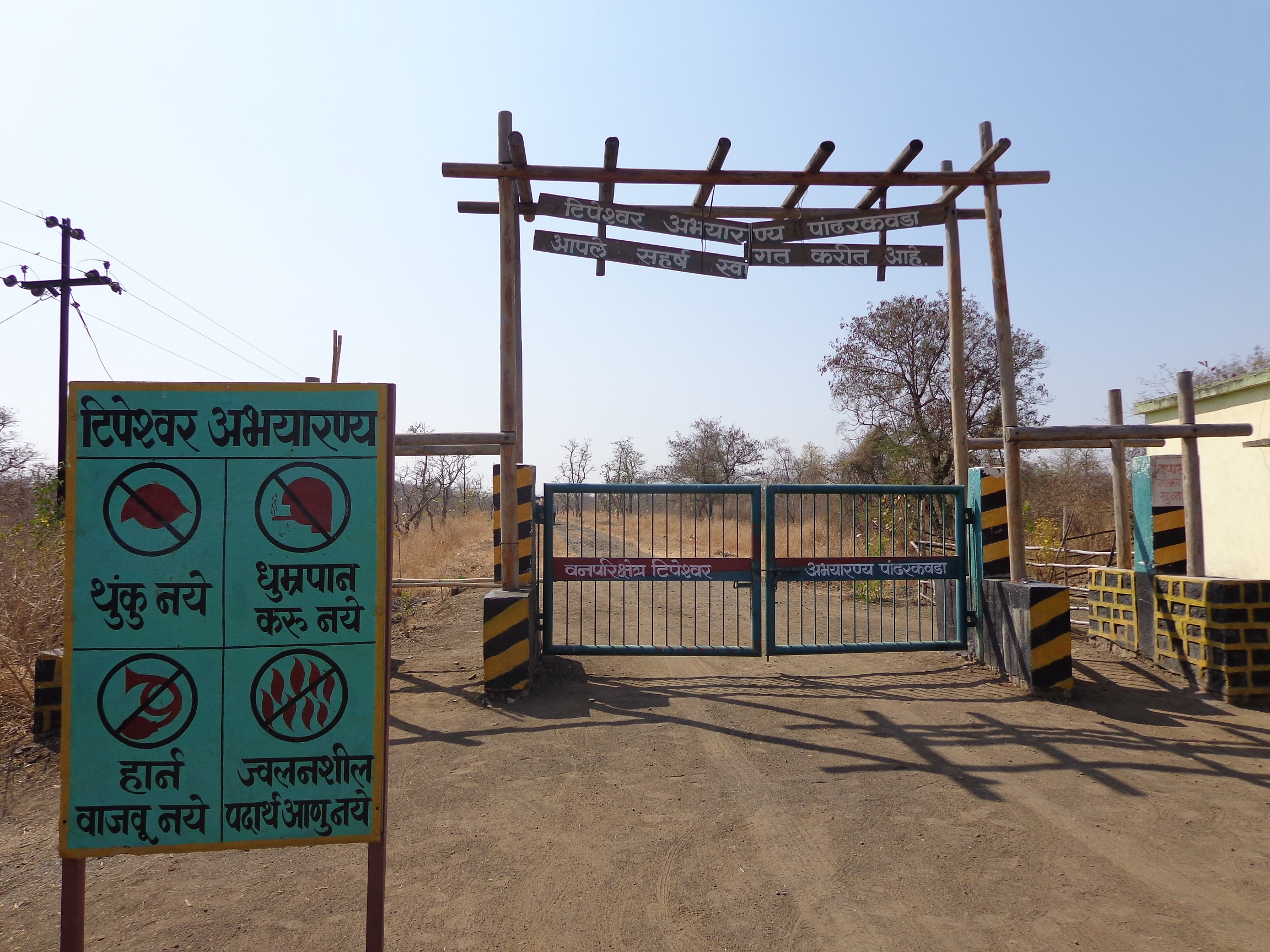
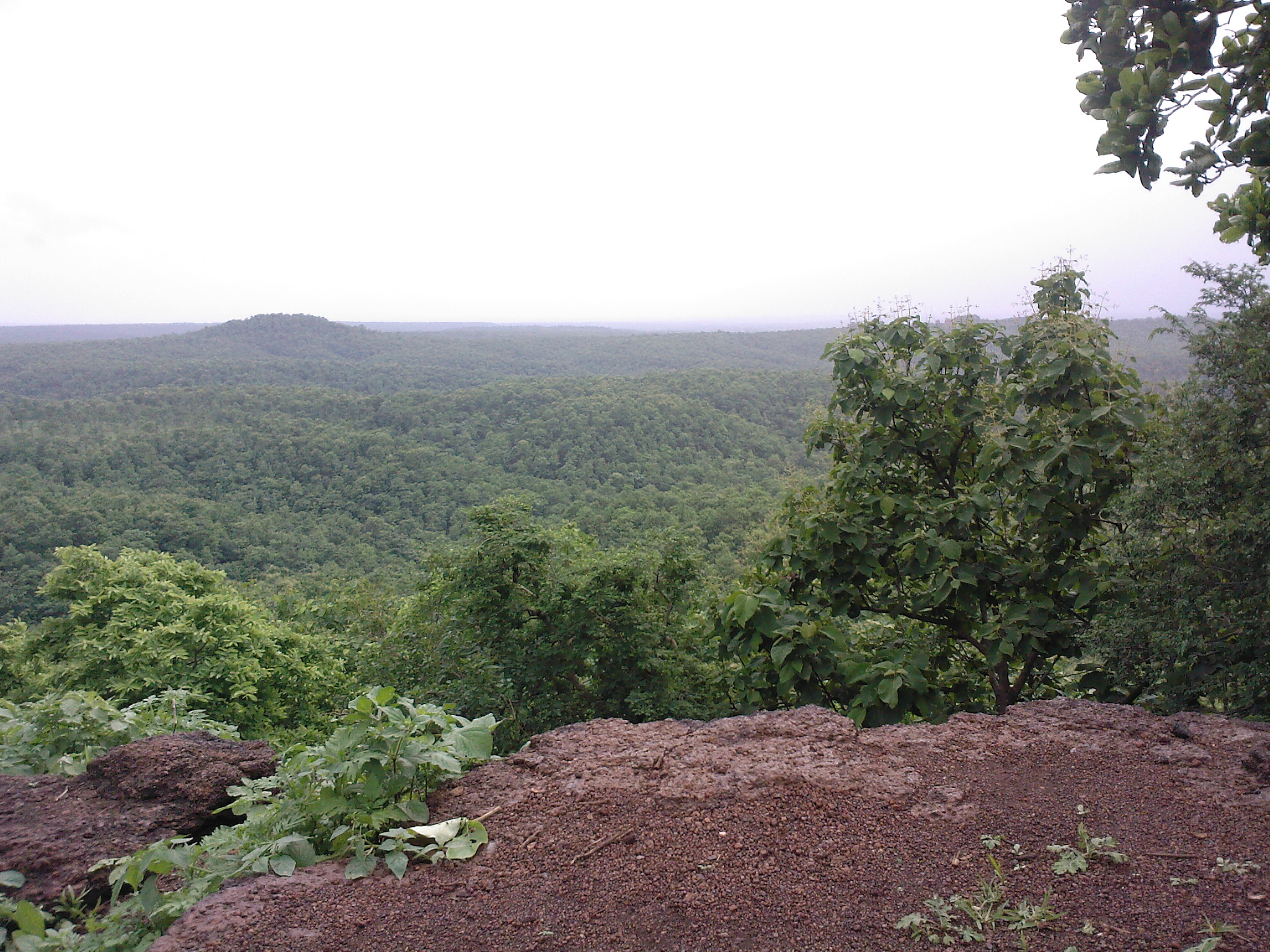
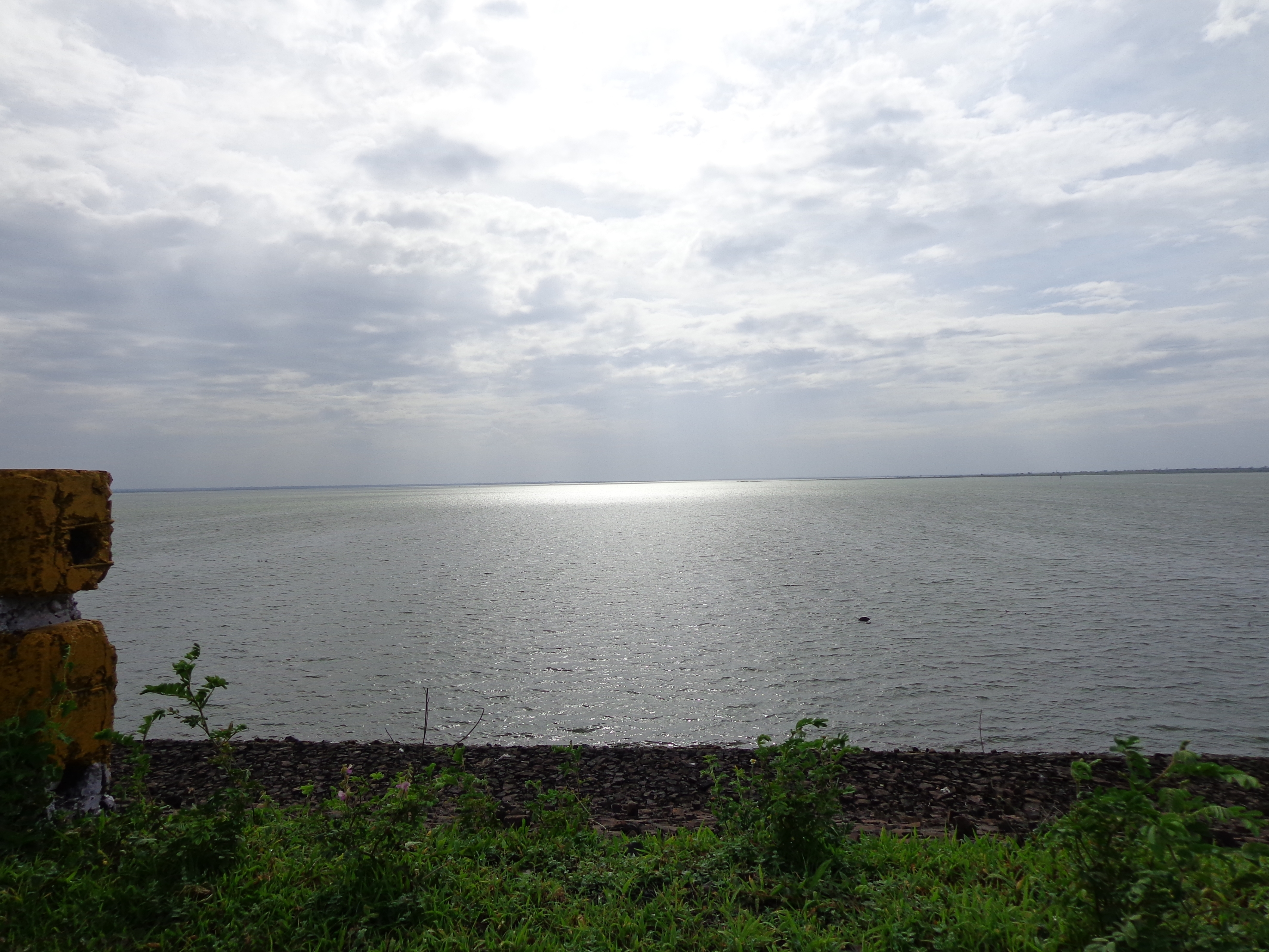
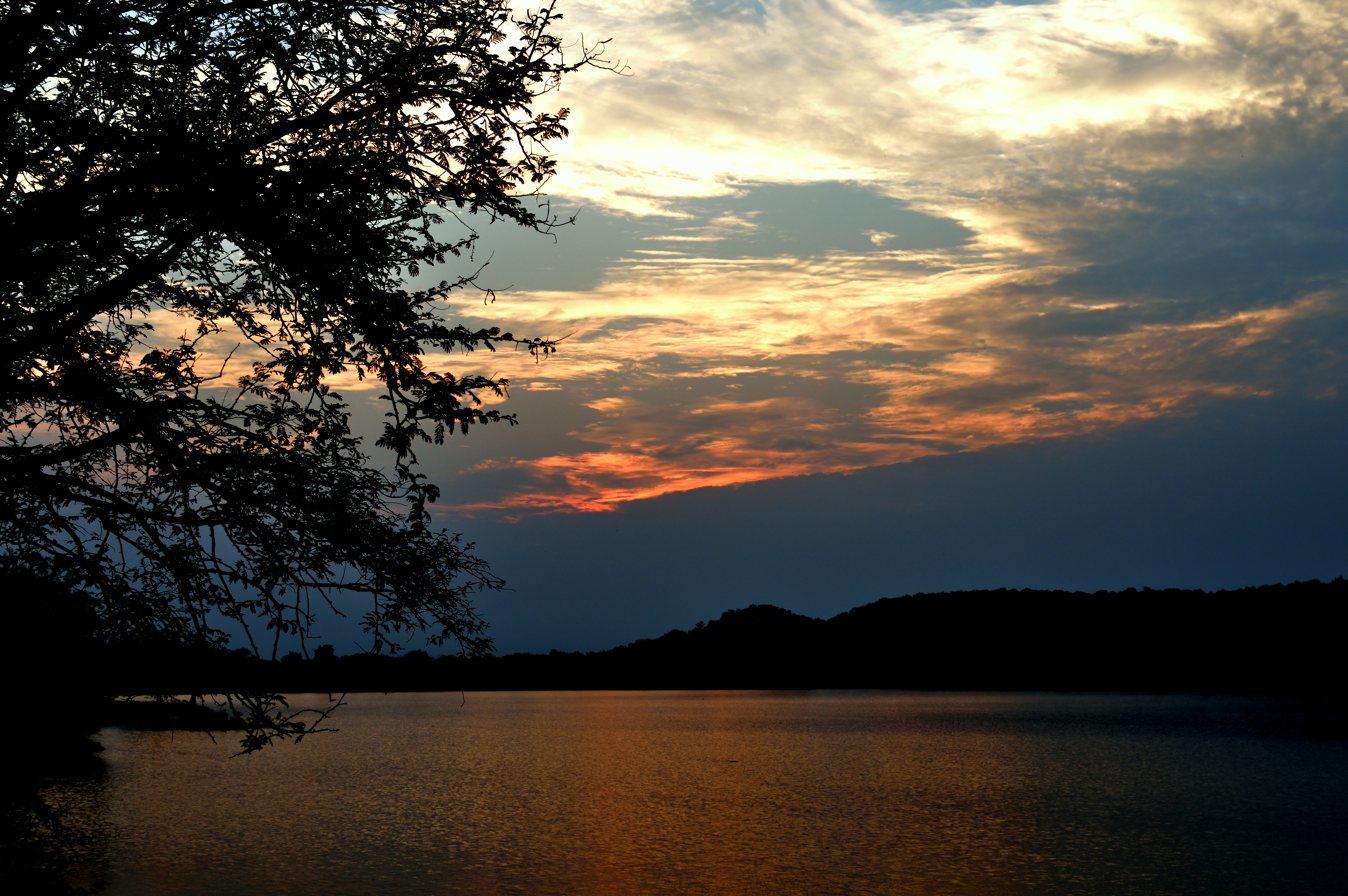
- Clockwise from top-left: Borgaon Dam, Tipeshwar Wildlife Sanctuary, Bembla Dam, lake in Yavatmal, Chavsala Takdi

- Location in Maharashtra
- Yavatmal district
- Country: India
- State: Maharashtra
- Division: Amravati
- Headquarters: Yavatmal
- Tehsils: Arni; Umarkhed; Kalamb; Pandharkaoda-Kelapur; Ghatanji; Zari Jamani; Darwha; Digras; Ner; Pusad; Babhulgaon; Mahagaon; Maregaon; Yavatmal; Ralegaon; Wani

Government
  - Body: Yavatmal Zilla Parishad
  - Guardian Minister: Sanjay Rathod (Cabinet Minister)
  - President Z. P. Yavatmal: NA
  - District Collector: Mr.Vikas Meena IAS
  - CEO Z. P. Yavatmal: Mr. Mandar Patki IAS
  - MPs: Sanjay Uttamrao Deshmukh (Yavatmal–Washim) Pratibha Balubhau Dhanorkar (Chandrapur) Nagesh Bapurao Patil Ashtikar (Hingoli)

Area
  - Total: 13,582 km^{2} (5,244 sq mi)

Population (2011)
  - Total: 2,772,348
  - Density: 204.12/km^{2} (528.67/sq mi)
  - Urban: 17%

Demographics
  - Literacy: 82.72%
  - Sex ratio: 951 women per 1,000 men
- Time zone: UTC+05:30 (IST)
- Major highways: NH7, NH361
- Average annual precipitation: 911.34 mm
- Website: yavatmal.nic.in

Yavatmal district, [jəʋət̪maːɭ] formerly known as Yeotmal, is a district of the Indian state of Maharashtra. It is located in the region of Vidarbha, in the east-central part of the state. It is Vidarbha's third-largest district by population, after Nagpur and Amravati. Yavatmal city is the administrative headquarters of the district.

== Officer ==
=== Members of Parliament ===
- Sanjay Deshmukh (SHS) (Yavatmal–Washim)
- Pratibha Dhanorkar (INC) (Chandrapur)
- Nagesh Bapurao Patil Ashtikar (SHS) (Hingoli)

=== Guardian Minister ===
Guardian Minister Yavatmal
- पालकमंत्री यवतमाळ
- Emblem of India
- Incumbent; Sanjay Rathod since 24 September 2022
- Style: The Honourable
- Residence: Yavatmal
- Appointer: Chief Minister of Maharashtra
- Term length: 5 years / No time limit
- Website: yavatmal.gov.in/en/

List of Guardian Ministers
Name	Term of office
Ajit Pawar; Deputy Chief Minister	11 November 2010 - 26 September 2014
Sanjay Rathod	5 December 2014 - 8 November 2019
Sandipanrao Bhumre	9 January 2020 - 27 June 2022
Shankarrao Gadakh Additional Charge	27 June 2022 - 29 June 2022
Sanjay Rathod	24 September 2022- Incumbent

=== District Magistrate/Collector ===
District Magistrate / Collector Yavatmal
- जिल्हाधिकारी तथा जिल्हदंडाधिकरी यवतमाळ
- Emblem of India
- Incumbent; Mr. Amol Yedge (IAS) since November 2021
- Residence: At Yavatmal district
- Appointer: Government of Maharashtra
- Term length: No time limit
- Website: yavatmal.gov.in/en/

List of District Magistrates / Collectors
Name	Term of office
Shri. Vikas Meena (IAS)	Incumbent

== History ==
=== Early history ===
It is believed that Yavatmal, along with the rest of the former Berar province, was part of the legendary kingdom of Vidarbha mentioned in the Mahabharata. Berar also formed part of the Mauryan Empire during the reign of Ashoka (272 to 231 BCE). Berar later came under the rule of the Satavahana dynasty (2nd century BCE to 2nd century CE), the Vakataka dynasty (3rd to 6th centuries), the Chalukya dynasty (6th to 8th centuries), the Rashtrakuta dynasty (8th to 10th centuries), the Western Chalukya (10th to 12th centuries), and finally the Yadava dynasty of Devagiri (late 12th to early 14th centuries).

=== Medieval history ===
A period of Muslim rule began when Ala ud din Khilji, Sultan of Delhi, conquered the region in the early 14th century. The region was part of the Bahmani Sultanate, which broke away from the Delhi Sultanate in the mid-14th century.

The Bahmani Sultanate broke into smaller sultanates at the end of the 15th century, and in 1572 Berar became part of the Nizam Shahi sultanate, based at Ahmednagar. The Nizam Shahis ceded Berar to the Mughal Empire in 1595. As Mughal rule started to unravel at the start of the 18th century, Asaf Jah I, Nizam of Hyderabad, seized the southern provinces of the empire (including Berar) in 1724, forming an independent state.

A detailed account of Berar was added to the Ain-i-Akbari in 1596–97, immediately after the treaty of Ahmadnagar under which the province was ceded to the Mughal Empire; this account may be regarded as a description of the province as it was administered by the Nizam Shahi and Imad Shahi kings, and probably also by the Bahamani Sultans. The account notes that Berar was divided into thirteen sarkars or revenue districts. The Yavatmal district comprised the greater part of Akbar's sarkars of Kalam and Mahur. But some few mahals of these sarkars lay beyond the present limits of the district. Yavatmal appears in the record as the headquarters of a pargana under the name of Yot-Lohara – Yot being the Urdu or Persian corruption of Yevata, the original name of the town; and Lohara the name of a village about 5 km (3 mi) to the west of Yavatmal. The suffix mal is a corruption of mahal (pargana-town). A rough estimate makes the land revenue demand in Akbar's time for the area now occupied by the district more than ten lakhs (one million) rupees, while it is certain that collection must have fallen far short of the nominal demand.

=== British colonial period ===
In 1853 the East Berar district, together with the rest of Berar, came under the administration of the British East India Company. After the Indian Rebellion of 1857, Hingoli and its adjoining areas were restored to the Nizam and the province was reconstituted into two districts, East Berar with its headquarters at Amravati, and West Berar with its headquarters at Akola. In 1864, British divided the East Berar into two districts: Amravati and Southeast Berar (which was first renamed as Wun district and then in 1905, Yeotmal district), with headquarters at Yeotmal. In 1867, Ellichpur District was also carved out of Amravati.

== Geography ==
Yavatmal District is situated in the south-western part of Wardha Penganga-Wainganga basin. The geographical location of the district falls in 19.26 and 20.42 north latitudes and 77.18 to 7.9.9 in the eastern line. The district is bordered in the east by Amravati and Wardha districts; in the north by Chandrapur, Telangana and Nanded districts; in the west by Parbhani and Akola districts.

The district covers 13,582 km^{2} (5,244 sq mi) (4.41 percent of the state). The total length of the district is 190 kilometres (120 mi), and the maximum width from north to south is 160 km (100 mi). The district occupies the southeastern part of Berar.

Yavatmal district is in the southern mountain ranges of Berar, situated on a wide plain surrounded by hilly terrain and mountain ranges running east to west. The central part is a plateau 300 to 600 metres (980 to 1,970 ft) above sea level. On its northern border is the Panighat, called the valley of Berar, which is 65 to 80 kilometres (40 to 50 mi) wide; only a 8-to-12-kilometre-wide (5 to 7 mi) portion of the valley is within Yavatmal district.

The two main rivers are the Penganga and Wardha. The Wardha originates in Madhya Pradesh. The Penganga river is the main tributary of the Wardha, and marks the southern boundary of the district before joining the Wardha. The Wardha's other tributaries include the Bembala and Nirguda, which flow only during the monsoon season. Other rivers include the Bembala and Nirguda rivers on the Yavatmal Plateau.

== Climate ==
The climate is dry and hot in summer with a moderately cold winter. The year is divided into four seasons: summer (March to May), southwest monsoon season (June to September), northern monsoon season (October to November), and winter (December to February).

The district receives an average annual rainfall of 911.34 mm (36 in). This generally increases from west to east, with 889 mm (35 in) in the western region of the district and 1,125 mm (44 in) in the east. Almost all of the rain falls during the southwest monsoon season. In recent years heavy rainfall has destroyed crops or left the land unsuitable for planting.

The average daily temperature in May reaches 42 °C (108 °F). The average daily minimum temperature is 13 °C (55 °F) in December. The district temperature may fall below 5 °C (41 °F) due to the humidity of cool northern air.

== Demographics ==
Historical population
Year	Pop.	±% p.a.
1901	577,101	—
1911	724,410	+2.30%
1921	748,959	+0.33%
1931	857,288	+1.36%
1941	887,738	+0.35%
1951	931,982	+0.49%
1961	1,098,470	+1.66%
1971	1,423,677	+2.63%
1981	1,737,423	+2.01%
1991	2,077,144	+1.80%
2001	2,458,271	+1.70%
2011	2,772,348	+1.21%

Religions in Yavatmal district (2011)
Religion	Percent
Hinduism	81.21%
Buddhism	9.01%
Islam	8.63%
Jainism	0.41%
Other or not stated	0.74%

According to the 2011 census Yavatmal district had a population of 2,772,348, roughly equal to the nation of Jamaica or the US state of Utah. Its population ranking was 141st in India (out of a total of 640), and 21st in the state (out of 35). The district had a population density of 204 inhabitants per square kilometre (530/sq mi). Its population growth rate over the decade 2001–2011 was 12.9%. Yavatmal had a sex ratio of 947 females for every 1000 males, and a literacy rate of 80.7%. 21.58% of the population live in urban areas. Scheduled Castes and Scheduled Tribes make up 11.85% and 18.54% of the population respectively.

=== Languages ===
Languages in Yavatmal district (2011)
1. Marathi (67.6%)
2. Lambadi (13.3%)
3. Urdu (5.41%)
4. Hindi (4.99%)
5. Kolami (2.77%)
6. Gondi (2.41%)
7. Telugu (1.69%)
8. Others (1.81%)

At the time of the 2011 Census of India, 67.57% of the population in the district spoke Marathi, 13.29% Lambadi, 5.41% Urdu, 4.99% Hindi, 2.77% Kolami, 2.41% Gondi and 1.69% Telugu as their first language.

Marathi is the major language. Other languages spoken are Urdu, Hindi, Telugu, Banjari, Gondi, Kolami and Andh, an Indo-Aryan language spoken by 100,000 people. People here speak with the Varhadi dialect.

== Divisions ==
Yavatmal district forms the southeast corner of Amravati Division, which corresponds to the former British Raj province of Berar. Yavatmal city is the administrative headquarters of this district.

Yavatmal district comprises sixteen tehsils:

- Arni
- Babhulgaon
- Darwha
- Digras
- Ghatanji
- Kalamb
- Mahagaon
- Maregaon
- Ner, Yavatmal
- Kelapur
- Pusad
- Ralegaon
- Umarkhed
- Wani
- Yavatmal
- Zari Jamani

There are seven Maharashtra Vidhan Sabha constituencies in this district:

- Digras
- Arni (ST)
- Pusad
- Ralegaon (ST)
- Umarkhed (SC)
- Wani
- Yavatmal

Notes:

- Wani and Arni Vidhan Sabha constituencies are part of Chandrapur Lok Sabha constituency.
- Umarkhed Vidhan Sabha constituency is part of Hingoli Lok Sabha constituency.
- Ralegaon, Digras, Yavatmal and Pusad Vidhan Sabha constituencies are part of Yavatmal-Washim Lok Sabha constituency.

== Transport ==
Yavatmal City and District has good connectivity of Transport to all major city in India and Maharastra i.e. Nagpur, Mumbai, Pune, Nashik, Nanded, Aurangabad, Amravati, Adilabad, Hyderabad.

National Highway 361 passes through Yavatmal City and district.

Proposed National Highway from Khandwa(MP) to Karanji is passing via Paratwada, Amravati, Yavatmal. Yavatmal to Amravati route needs to be built newly via Pimpalgaon, Sawar, Dabha(pahur), Rajura, Bankhead as the existing are unnecessarily too long to travel.

Jawaharlal Darda Yavatmal Airport, Bhari, Yavatmal.

Yavatmal-Murtijapur Railway Line (Work in Progress)

Wardha-Yavatmal-Nanded Railway Line (Work in Progress)

India's first Broad Gauge Metro will run from Nagpur to Yavatmal

In future Maharashtra's Nagpur or Chandrapur to Pune expressway if propose can be pass via Yavatmal, washim, Lonar, Paithan, Ahmednagar.

== Economy ==
As Yavatmal is Cotton City Jowar and cotton are the main produce of the district, cotton and teakwood the chief exports. Other items exported include lime, wooden furniture and oranges. soybean crop is an important crop as major soybean plants have come up in the area.

In 2006 the Ministry of Panchayati Raj named Yavatmal one of the country's 250 most-backward districts (out of a total of 640). It is one of the twelve districts in Maharashtra currently receiving funds from the Backward Regions Grant Fund Programme (BRGF).

=== Mining ===
The geology of the district is transitional with Deccan trap rocks (lava bed) predominating, displaying characteristic step-like hills and ridges. These have been eroded through in places, exposing older Puranic and Aryan sediments.

=== Forestry ===
Forsts are located at Bitargaon, Tipeshwar, Tiwsala and Umbarda. Trees include teak, tendu, hirda, apta and moha, as well as bamboo. Wild-bear, deer, nilgai, sambar, hyena and peacock are among the animals found in the forests. There are wildlife sanctuaries at Tipeshwar and Painganga.Tipeshwar is in way to become Tiger Reserve in India.

=== Tourism ===
Arni and Digras tehsils are pilgrimage locations, important for the journeys of Baba Kambalposh R.A. Shrine and Shri Ghantibaba Temple. They also have the Shri Chintamani temple of Kalamb, Ghatanji Maroti Maharaj Yatra and the Shree Datta Jayanti festival at Jambhora Mahur.

Ner tehsil have temple called Shri Fakirji Maharaj Sansthan, Dhanaj Manikwada which is Grade 'B' pilgrimage by Gramvikas Department of Maharashtra State Government.

Shree Chintamani Ganesh Temple is at Kalamb on the bank of the Chakravati.

The district has various entrenched cultures and tribal communities, including the Gond Raja, Gond Pardhan, Kolam, Aandh and Banjara. Various religious fairs take place in the district including:

- Fakirji Maharaj Fair, Dhanaj Manikwada, is a pilgrimage place for both Hindu as well as Muslim people. He was a saint lived 250–300 years back. Temple culture reflects the varkari sampraday. Trust is associated with different social activities. Devotees visit this place on Kartik and Ashadi Yatra. Kanya-bhakar mahaprasad in yatra and Saath Festival is famous in Maharashtra.
- Shree Chintamani Fair, Kalamb
- The Jambhora and Mahashiv Ratri in Wani, Pusad and Mahagaon
- Shri Rangnaath Swamy, Wani
- Amba Devi, Kelapur
- Baba Kambalposh R.A. Urs/Fair, Arni
- Maroti and Gajanan Maharaj Fair, Ghatanji
- Ghanti Baba chi Yatra, Digras
- Painganga Wildlife Sanctuary
- Ambona lake
- Sahasrakund Waterfall
- Shri Kshetra Panchmukhi Mahadev Mandir, Hardada
- Balaji Mandir, Dhanora(Sa)

There are also forest locations for tourists and hot springs at Kapeshwar on the banks of Penganga.

== Notable people ==
- Vasantrao Naik - Former & Longest ruling CM of Maharashtra.
- Keshav Baliram Hedgewar, Founding Sarsanghachalak of the Rashtriya Swayamsevak Sangh
- Aajibai Banarase, community leader and president of Maharashtra Mandal London.
- Vijay Darda, former MP (Rajya Sabha), Chairman Lokmat media Pvt. Ltd
- Jambuwantrao Dhote, politician and founder of Vidarbha Janata Congress
- Nachiket Mor, banker and National Director for Bill and Melinda Gates Foundation.
- Sudhakarrao Naik, former Chief Minister of Maharashtra.
- Sanjay Rathod, former Guardian minister Yavatmal
- Manikrao Thakare, former President Maharashtra State Congress Committee
- Madan Madhukarrao Yerawar, former Guardian minister Yavatmal
- Wasudev Waman Patankar, Marathi poet and advocate (1908–1997)
- Akash Chikte, Indian field hockey player
- Suryakanta Patil, Indian politician
- Lalit Yadav, Vidharbha cricketer
- Alind Naidu, Vidharbha cricketer
- Ashok Uike, Former Minister of Tribal Development
- Vasant Purke, Politician and former Minister of Education
- Sanjay Uttamrao Deshmukh, M.P Yavatmal-Washim & Ex-MLA
- Jawaharlal Darda, Freedom Fighter
- Madhav Shrihari Aney (Loknayak Bapuji Aney [Padma Vibhushan]) Ardent educationist, freedom fighter, statesman, a modern Sanskrit poet and a politician
- Rajendra Darda, Politician
- Shivajirao Moghe, Former Minister of Social Justice in Maharashtra Cabinet
- Faheem Hussain, Pakistani physicist
- Harising Nasaru Rathod, Politician
