= Kelapur =

- city
- Location in Maharashtra, India
- Coordinates: 20.0167°N 78.5333°E
- Country: India
- State: Maharashtra
- District: Yavatmal
- Elevation: 240 m (790 ft)

Languages
  - Official: Marathi
- Time zone: UTC+5:30 (IST)

Kelapur (also called as Pandharkawda) is a census town, tehsil and subdivision of Yavatmal district in the state of Maharashtra, India.

It is located on Srinagar - Nagpur - Hyderabad - Bangalore - Kanyakumari National Highway 44.

It is famous for the Jagadamba Bhavani Mata Temple. The temple is the oldest one in this region, and devotees come from not only Maharashtra State but also from states like Telangana. This Bhavani Mata is considered the Tuljapur Bhavani Mata with a different name.
