= Babhulgaon =

- village
- Location within Maharashtra
- Country =India: India
- State: Maharashtra
- District: Hingoli

Population (2001)
  - Total: 2,589

Languages
  - Official: Marathi
- Time zone: UTC+5:30 (IST)
- Postal code: 431703

Babhulgaon is a village and tehsil in Sengaon subdivision of Hingoli district in the state of Maharashtra, India.

== Demographics ==
As of 2001 India census, Babhulgaon had a population of 2589. Males constitute 52% of the population and females 48%. Babhulgaon has an average literacy rate of 47%, lower than the national average of 59.5%; with 66% of the males and 34% of females literate. 17% of the population is under 6 years of age.
