= Darwha Assembly constituency =

Former constituency of the Maharashtra legislative assembly in India

Coordinates: 20.31°N 77.77°E

Darwha
- Former constituency for the Maharashtra Legislative Assembly

Constituency details
- Country: India
- Region: Western India
- State: Maharashtra
- District: Washim
- Lok Sabha constituency: Yavatmal-Washim
- Established: 1951
- Abolished: 2008

Darwha Vidhan Sabha seat was one of the constituencies of Maharashtra Vidhan Sabha, in India. Darwha seat existed from 1972 until the 2004 elections. Darwha is in Yavatmal district.

It is a segment of the Yavatmal-Washim (Lok Sabha constituency) with adjoining Washim district along with five other Vidhan Sabha assembly constituencies, viz. Washim (SC), Karanja, Ralegaon (ST), Yavatmal (ST) and Pusad.

== Members of Legislative Assembly ==
| Year | Member | Party |
|---|---|---|
| 1952 | Deoram Shirom Patil | Independent |
| 1957 | Deoram Shirom Patil | Independent |
| 1962 | Alihasan Mamdani | Indian National Congress |
| 1967 | Vishwasrao alias Balasaheb Ghuikhedkar | Independent |
| 1972 | Alihasan Mamdani | Indian National Congress |
| 1978 | Harish Mandhana | Independent |
| 1980 | Harish Mandhana | Indian National Congress (I) |
| 1985 | Manikrao Thakre | Indian National Congress |
| 1990 | Manikrao Thakre | Indian National Congress |
| 1995 | Manikrao Thakre | Indian National Congress |
| 1999 | Manikrao Thakre | Indian National Congress |
| 2004 | Sanjay Rathod | Shiv Sena |
2008 onwards : See Digras

Madhya Pradesh
Bombay State

== Election results ==
=== Assembly Election 2004 ===
2004 Maharashtra Legislative Assembly election : Darwha
| Party | Candidate | Votes | % | ±% |
|---|---|---|---|---|
| SS | Sanjay Rathod | 68,586 | 48.94% | ▲34.71 |
| INC | Manikrao Govindrao Thakare | 47,044 | 33.57% | ▼13.27 |
| BSP | Thokal Subhas Madhukarrao | 16,775 | 11.97% | New |
| Independent | Vasantrao Pundlikrao Dhoke | 2,409 | 1.72% | New |
| CPI | Saturwar Ramesh Vithalrao | 1,979 | 1.41% | ▼2.36 |
| Independent | Jadhav Nemichand Ramprasad | 1,133 | 0.81% | New |
| Margin of victory | | 21,542 | 15.37% | ▼5.80 |
| Turnout | | 140,251 | 75.57% | ▲13.50 |
| Total valid votes | | 140,134 | | |
| Registered electors | | 185,581 | | ▲14.06 |
| SS gain from INC | | Swing | ▲2.10 | |

=== Assembly Election 1999 ===
1999 Maharashtra Legislative Assembly election : Darwha
| Party | Candidate | Votes | % | ±% |
|---|---|---|---|---|
| INC | Manikrao Govindrao Thakare | 43,474 | 46.84% | ▲10.75 |
| Independent | Marotrao Vitthalrao Jait Alias Babu Patil Jait | 23,821 | 25.67% | New |
| SS | Deepak Nanabhau Embadwar | 13,206 | 14.23% | ▼6.58 |
| CPI | Satturwar Ramesh Vitthalrao | 3,497 | 3.77% | New |
| Independent | Rathod Sitaram Kashiram | 3,469 | 3.74% | New |
| Independent | Tayade Sudhakar Amrutrao | 1,704 | 1.84% | New |
| Independent | Mohammed Yusuf Shakil M. Suleman | 1,216 | 1.31% | New |
| Independent | Nana Baburao Rathod | 1,061 | 1.14% | New |
| Margin of victory | | 19,653 | 21.17% | ▲18.77 |
| Turnout | | 100,997 | 62.07% | ▼15.67 |
| Total valid votes | | 92,813 | | |
| Registered electors | | 162,708 | | ▲0.70 |
| INC hold | | Swing | ▲10.75 | |

=== Assembly Election 1995 ===
1995 Maharashtra Legislative Assembly election : Darwha
| Party | Candidate | Votes | % | ±% |
|---|---|---|---|---|
| INC | Manikrao Govindrao Thakare | 44,645 | 36.09% | ▲7.34 |
| BBM | Pawar Makharam Banduji | 41,677 | 33.69% | New |
| SS | Dehankar Vinod Chintaman | 25,737 | 20.81% | ▼2.28 |
| JD | Gorde Sudhir Marotrao | 4,921 | 3.98% | ▼8.23 |
| Independent | Mohod Nitin Purushottam | 2,159 | 1.75% | New |
| Margin of victory | | 2,968 | 2.40% | ▼3.26 |
| Turnout | | 125,606 | 77.74% | ▲10.82 |
| Total valid votes | | 123,702 | | |
| Registered electors | | 161,572 | | ▲14.58 |
| INC hold | | Swing | ▲7.34 | |

=== Assembly Election 1990 ===
1990 Maharashtra Legislative Assembly election : Darwha
| Party | Candidate | Votes | % | ±% |
|---|---|---|---|---|
| INC | Manikrao Govindrao Thakare | 26,781 | 28.75% | ▼14.76 |
| SS | Shridhar Dhondabaji Mohod | 21,504 | 23.09% | New |
| Independent | Marotrao Vitthalrao Jait alias Babu Patil Jait | 16,325 | 17.53% | New |
| BRP | Telang Chandan Raghobaji | 12,770 | 13.71% | New |
| JD | Imgole Sandhya Vasantrao | 11,370 | 12.21% | New |
| Independent | Nimkar Devidas Ramji | 1,500 | 1.61% | New |
| Independent | Londhe Kesharao Sambhaji | 879 | 0.94% | New |
| Margin of victory | | 5,277 | 5.66% | ▲3.48 |
| Turnout | | 94,366 | 66.92% | ▼1.30 |
| Total valid votes | | 93,151 | | |
| Registered electors | | 141,013 | | ▲22.88 |
| INC hold | | Swing | ▼14.76 | |

=== Assembly Election 1985 ===
1985 Maharashtra Legislative Assembly election : Darwha
| Party | Candidate | Votes | % | ±% |
|---|---|---|---|---|
| INC | Manikrao Govindrao Thakare | 33,594 | 43.51% | New |
| IC(S) | Shankarrao Gopal Rathod | 31,911 | 41.33% | New |
| Independent | Chandrabhan Ambadas Wankhade | 6,204 | 8.03% | New |
| RPI | Sanone Udebhanji Tanaji | 2,370 | 3.07% | ▼10.22 |
| Independent | Majure Madhukarrao Rajaramji | 2,026 | 2.62% | New |
| Independent | Abdul Gaffar Qarshi | 627 | 0.81% | New |
| Margin of victory | | 1,683 | 2.18% | ▼8.69 |
| Turnout | | 78,288 | 68.22% | ▲7.51 |
| Total valid votes | | 77,217 | | |
| Registered electors | | 114,753 | | ▲7.45 |
| INC gain from INC(I) | | Swing | ▼1.66 | |

=== Assembly Election 1980 ===
1980 Maharashtra Legislative Assembly election : Darwha
| Party | Candidate | Votes | % | ±% |
|---|---|---|---|---|
| INC(I) | Harish Rameshwar Mandhana | 28,881 | 45.17% | New |
| INC(U) | Shankarrao Gopal Rathod | 21,929 | 34.30% | New |
| RPI | Ingole Pandurang Yashwant | 8,498 | 13.29% | New |
| BJP | Ikramulla Alimulla | 2,407 | 3.76% | New |
| Independent | Thakare Madhaorao Keshaorao | 1,388 | 2.17% | New |
| Independent | Khadare Deoba Pandurang | 546 | 0.85% | New |
| Margin of victory | | 6,952 | 10.87% | ▼24.67 |
| Turnout | | 64,836 | 60.71% | ▼15.92 |
| Total valid votes | | 63,935 | | |
| Registered electors | | 106,799 | | ▲5.89 |
| INC(I) gain from Independent | | Swing | ▼14.38 | |

=== Assembly Election 1978 ===
1978 Maharashtra Legislative Assembly election : Darwha
| Party | Candidate | Votes | % | ±% |
|---|---|---|---|---|
| Independent | Harish Rameshwar Mandhana | 45,194 | 59.55% | New |
| INC | Vishwasrao Balkrushna Ghuikhedkar alias Balasaheb Ghuikhedkar | 18,218 | 24.00% | ▼9.61 |
| RPI(K) | Kazi Syed Moinuddin Kazi Bashiruddin | 10,343 | 13.63% | New |
| Independent | Patil Ramdas Mukunda | 1,253 | 1.65% | New |
| Independent | Madhukar Dadarao Gudadhe | 889 | 1.17% | New |
| Margin of victory | | 26,976 | 35.54% | ▲29.61 |
| Turnout | | 77,293 | 76.63% | ▲0.95 |
| Total valid votes | | 75,897 | | |
| Registered electors | | 100,860 | | ▲16.98 |
| Independent gain from INC | | Swing | ▲25.94 | |

=== Assembly Election 1972 ===
1972 Maharashtra Legislative Assembly election : Darwha
| Party | Candidate | Votes | % | ±% |
|---|---|---|---|---|
| INC | Ali Hasan Jiwabhai Mamdani | 21,261 | 33.61% | ▲1.27 |
| AIFB | Harish Rameshwar Mandhana | 17,512 | 27.68% | New |
| Independent | Mahure Gulabrao Anandrao | 15,709 | 24.83% | New |
| RPI | Gadpavale Ramdas Somaji | 7,168 | 11.33% | ▼2.95 |
| Independent | Chavhan Ramdas Sawai | 1,012 | 1.60% | New |
| Margin of victory | | 3,749 | 5.93% | ▼13.21 |
| Turnout | | 65,252 | 75.68% | ▼1.72 |
| Total valid votes | | 63,258 | | |
| Registered electors | | 86,223 | | ▲10.70 |
| INC gain from Independent | | Swing | ▼17.87 | |

=== Assembly Election 1967 ===
1967 Maharashtra Legislative Assembly election : Darwha
| Party | Candidate | Votes | % | ±% |
|---|---|---|---|---|
| Independent | Vishwasrao Balkrushna Ghuikhedkar alias Balasaheb Ghuikhedkar | 29,163 | 51.48% | New |
| INC | R. R. Mahure | 18,320 | 32.34% | ▼22.47 |
| RPI | S. K. Sirsat | 8,087 | 14.28% | New |
| ABJS | J. K. Dhotkar | 1,077 | 1.90% | New |
| Margin of victory | | 10,843 | 19.14% | ▼12.42 |
| Turnout | | 60,285 | 77.40% | ▲2.15 |
| Total valid votes | | 56,647 | | |
| Registered electors | | 77,887 | | ▲8.93 |
| Independent gain from INC | | Swing | ▼3.33 | |

=== Assembly Election 1962 ===
1962 Maharashtra Legislative Assembly election : Darwha
| Party | Candidate | Votes | % | ±% |
|---|---|---|---|---|
| INC | Ali Hasan Jiwabhai Mamdani | 27,582 | 54.81% | ▲14.43 |
| Independent | Hanawantgir Mahadeogir | 11,701 | 23.25% | New |
| RPI | Hiraman Bakaram Sondawle | 10,537 | 20.94% | New |
| Independent | Mahadeo Shankar Bhowate | 500 | 0.99% | New |
| Margin of victory | | 15,881 | 31.56% | ▲19.84 |
| Turnout | | 53,805 | 75.25% | ▲7.23 |
| Total valid votes | | 50,320 | | |
| Registered electors | | 71,503 | | ▲12.54 |
| INC gain from Independent | | Swing | ▲2.71 | |

=== Assembly Election 1957 ===
1957 Bombay State Legislative Assembly election : Darwha
| Party | Candidate | Votes | % | ±% |
|---|---|---|---|---|
| Independent | Deorao Sheoram Patil | 22,517 | 52.10% | New |
| INC | Chhabubai W/o Uttamrao | 17,453 | 40.38% | ▲4.74 |
| Independent | Raut Pundlik Madhao | 2,034 | 4.71% | New |
| Independent | Sawalakhe Kisan Govind | 1,215 | 2.81% | New |
| Margin of victory | | 5,064 | 11.72% | ▼3.42 |
| Turnout | | 43,219 | 68.02% | ▲1.51 |
| Total valid votes | | 43,219 | | |
| Registered electors | | 63,536 | | ▲22.07 |
| Independent hold | | Swing | ▲1.32 | |

=== Assembly Election 1952 ===
1952 Hyderabad State Legislative Assembly election : Darwha
| Party | Candidate | Votes | % | ±% |
|---|---|---|---|---|
| Independent | Deorao Sheoram Patil | 17,579 | 50.78% | New |
| INC | Madhaorao Baburao Mahindre | 12,337 | 35.64% | New |
| Socialist | Baheshwar Mohanlal Mandhana | 3,866 | 11.17% | New |
| Independent | Keshaorao Sitaram Shelke | 510 | 1.47% | New |
| Independent | Shankar Deoba Thakre | 324 | 0.94% | New |
| Margin of victory | | 5,242 | 15.14% | |
| Turnout | | 34,616 | 66.51% | |
| Total valid votes | | 34,616 | | |
| Registered electors | | 52,047 | | |
| Independent win (new seat) | | | | |
