= Yavatmal–Washim Lok Sabha constituency =

Lok Sabha Constituency in Maharashtra

Coordinates: 20.3°N 77.6°E

Yavatmal-Washim Lok Sabha
- Lok Sabha constituency
- Yavatmal-Washim Lok Sabha Constituency map

Constituency details
- Country: India
- Region: Western India
- State: Maharashtra
- Assembly constituencies: Washim; Karanja; Ralegaon; Yavatmal; Digras; Pusad
- Established: 2008
- Total electors: 19,40,916
- Reservation: None

Member of Parliament
- 18th Lok Sabha
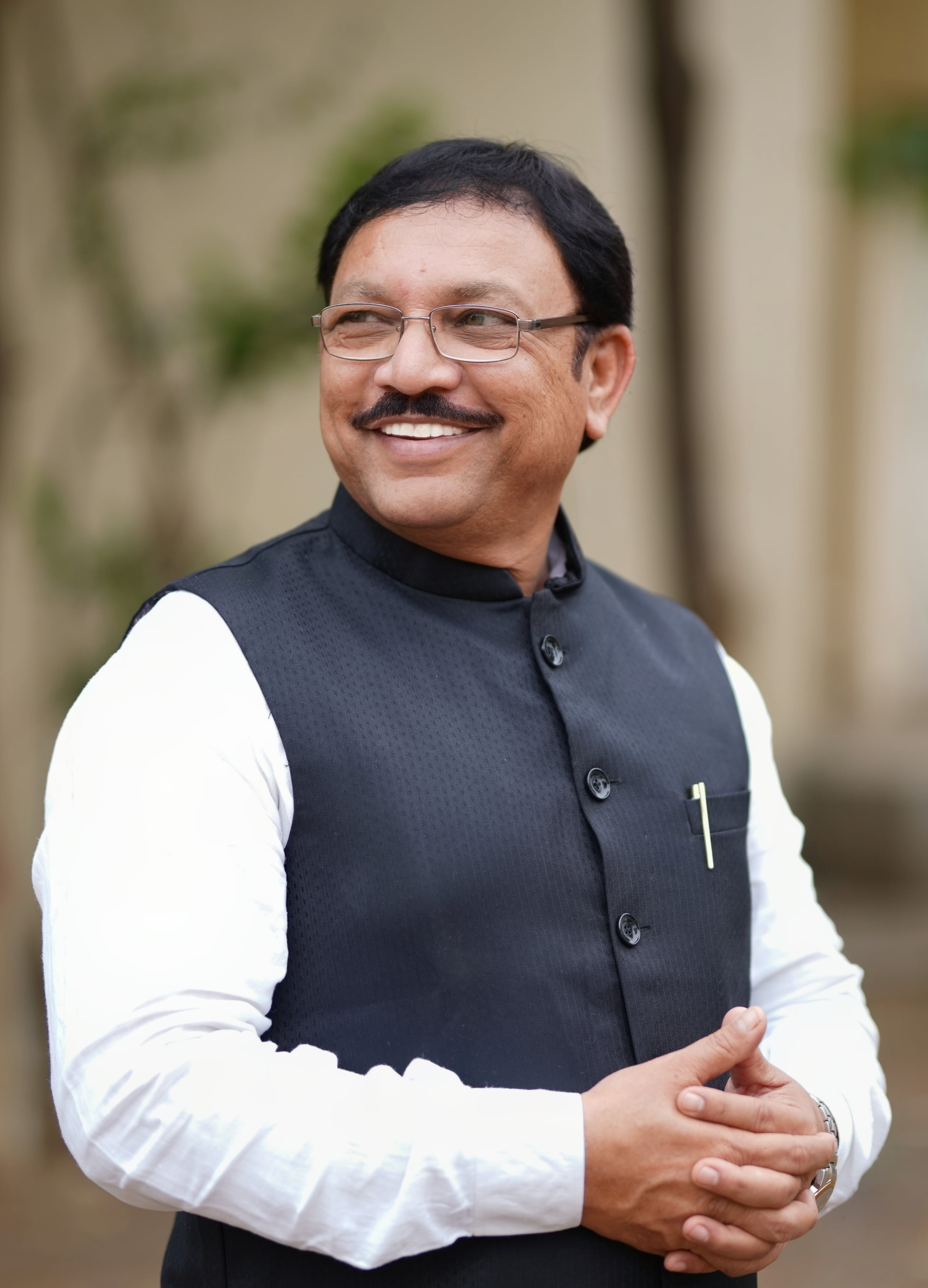
- Incumbent Sanjay Uttamrao Deshmukh
- Party: SHS
- Alliance: NDA
- Elected year: 2024
- Preceded by: Bhavana Gawali

Yavatmal–Washim Lok Sabha constituency is one of the 48 Lok Sabha (lower house of the Indian parliament) constituencies of Maharashtra state in western India. This constituency was created on 19 February 2008 as a part of the implementation of the Presidential notification based on the recommendations of the Delimitation Commission of India constituted on 12 July 2002. It held its first election in 2009 which was won by Bhavana Gawali of Shiv Sena.

== Vidhan Sabha segments ==
Presently, Yavatmal–Washim Lok Sabha constituency comprises six Vidhan Sabha (legislative assembly) segments.

#	Name	District	Member	Party	Leading (in 2024)
34	Washim (SC)	Washim	Shyam Ramcharan Khode	BJP	SS(UBT)
35	Karanja	Washim	Sai Prakash Dahake	BJP	SS(UBT)
77	Ralegaon (ST)	Yavatmal	Ashok Uike	BJP	SS(UBT)
78	Yavatmal	Yavatmal	Balasaheb Mangulkar	INC	SS(UBT)
79	Digras	Yavatmal	Sanjay Rathod	SHS	SS(UBT)
81	Pusad	Yavatmal	Indranil Naik	NCP	SHS

== Members of Parliament ==
Year	Name	Party
Before 2008 : See Yavatmal, Washim
2009	Bhavana Gawali Patil	Shiv Sena
2014	Bhavana Gawali Patil	Shiv Sena
2019	Bhavana Gawali Patil	Shiv Sena
2024	Sanjay Deshmukh	Shiv Sena (Uddhav Balasaheb Thackeray)

== Election results ==
=== General Elections 2024 ===
2024 Indian general elections: Yavatmal-Washim
Party	Candidate	Votes	%	±%
SS(UBT)	Sanjay Deshmukh	594,807	48.53	New
SHS	Rajshritai Hemant Patil (Mahalle)	5,00,334	40.83	▼5.34
Samnak Janta Party	Anil Jayram Rathod	56,390	4.60	N/A
BSP	Harising Rathod	17,396	1.46	▲0.64
NOTA	None of the Above	9,391	0.77	▲0.43
Majority		94,473	7.71	▼2.40
Turnout		12,25,530	63.14	▲1.83
SS(UBT) gain from SS		Swing		

=== General Election 2019 ===
2019 Indian general elections: Yavatmal-Washim
Party	Candidate	Votes	%	±%
SS	Bhavana Gawali Patil	542,098	46.17	
INC	Manikrao Thakare	4,24,159	36.12	
VBA	Pravin Govind Pawar	94,228	8.02	+8.02
BSP	Arun Sakharam Kinwatkar	9,587	0.82	
BMP	Ravi Sampatrao Jadhao	3,006	0.26	
NOTA	None of the Above	3,966	0.34	
Margin of victory		1,18,749	10.11	
Turnout		11,74,824	61.31	
SS hold		Swing		

=== General election 2014 ===
2014 Indian general elections: Yavatmal-Washim
Party	Candidate	Votes	%	±%
SS	Bhavana Gawali Patil	4,77,905	46.27	+0.51
INC	Shivajirao Moghe	3,84,089	37.18	−1.80
BSP	Rathod Baliram Parashram	48,981	4.74	−2.73
MNS	Raju Patil Raje	26,194	2.54	N/A
Independent	Gaikawad Rajendra Vitthal	7,482	0.72	N/A
Independent	Ulhas Vasramji Jadhao	7,166	0.69	N/A
AAP	Naresh F. Rathod	6,423	0.62	N/A
WPOI	Abrar Ahmad Mahmud Khan	5,672	0.55	N/A
AIFB	Bhau Jambuwantrao Dhote	4,708	0.46	N/A
BMP	Rathod Induwar Kashiram	4,627	0.45	N/A
Republican Party of India (Khobragade)	Sudhakar Namdeorao Gughane	3,602	0.35	N/A
SP	Ahmad Parvez Iqbal Ahmad Nur Mohammad	3,262	0.32	+0.14
CPI(ML) Red Star	Sawake Ramkrushna Pundlikrao	2,193	0.21	N/A
NOTA	None of the above	5,583	0.54	N/A
Margin of victory		93,816	9.09	+2.31
Turnout		10,33,402	58.87	+4.77
SS hold		Swing		

=== General election 2009 ===
2009 Indian general elections: Yavatmal-Washim
Party	Candidate	Votes	%	±%
SS	Bhavana Gawali Patil	3,84,443	45.76	N/A
INC	Harising Nasaru Rathod	3,27,492	38.98	N/A
BSP	Dilip Yedatkar	62,781	7.47	N/A
Prabuddha Republican Party	Uttam Bhagaji Kamble	8,192	0.98	N/A
AIUDF	Maniyar Yunus Mahmood Zahmi	7,412	0.88	N/A
Independent	Purushottam Domaji Bhajgawre	6,126	0.73	N/A
BBM	Kureshi S. K. Mehbub S. K. Fattu	4,506	0.54	N/A
SP	Mohammad Khan Aziz Khan	1,498	0.18	N/A
RSPS	Dhage Vitthal Mahadev	1,151	0.14	N/A
Margin of victory		56,951	6.78	N/A
Turnout		8,40,064	54.10	N/A
SS win (new seat)				

== See also ==
- Yavatmal Lok Sabha constituency (1951 to 2004 elections for 1st to 14th Lok Sabha)
- Washim Lok Sabha constituency (1977 to 2004 elections for 6th to 14th Lok Sabha)
- Yavatmal district
- Washim district
- List of constituencies of the Lok Sabha
