= Ministry of Soil and Water Conservation (Maharashtra) =

Maharashtra government ministry responsible for Soil and Water Conservation

Ministry of Soil and Water Conservation Government of Maharashtra
- मंत्रालय मृदा आणि जलसंधारण विभाग, महाराष्ट्र शासन
- Seal of the state of Maharashtra

- Building of Administrative Headquarters of Mumbai

Ministry overview
- Jurisdiction: (India) Maharashtra
- Headquarters: Mantralay, Mumbai
- Minister responsible: Sanjay Rathod, Cabinet Minister
- Deputy Minister responsible: Indranil Naik, Minister of State
- Ministry executive: (IAS)
- Parent department: Government of Maharashtra

The Ministry of Soil and Water Conservation is a Ministry of the Government of Maharashtra.

The Ministry is headed by a cabinet level Minister. Sanjay Rathod is Current Minister of Soil and Water Conservation Government of Maharashtra.

== Head office ==
Minister of Soil and Water Conservation मंत्री मृदा आणि जलसंधारण विभाग
- Emblem of India

- Flag of India
- Incumbent; Sanjay Rathod since 21 December 2024
- Ministry of Soil and Water Conservation (Maharashtra)
- Style: The Honourable
- Abbreviation: Cabinet Minister
- Member of: State Cabinet
- Reports to: Chief Minister, Maharashtra Legislature
- Seat: Mantralaya, Mumbai
- Appointer: Governor on the advice of the Chief Minister
- Term length: 5 years
- Precursor: Devendra Fadnavis Chief Minister; (2024- 2024)
- Inaugural holder: Abdul Kader Salebhoy; (1960-1962)
- Formation: 1 May 1960
- Deputy: Indranil Naik

== Cabinet Ministers ==
No.	Portrait	Minister (Constituency)	Term of office			Political party	Ministry	Chief Minister
No.	Portrait	Minister (Constituency)	From	To	Period	Political party	Ministry	Chief Minister
Minister of Soil and Water Conservation
01		S. K. Wankhede (MLA for Sawargoan Constituency No. 49- Nagpur District) (Legislative Assembly)	01 May 1960	07 March 1962	1 year, 310 days	Indian National Congress	Yashwantrao I	Yashwantrao Chavan
02		Abdul Kader Salebhoy (MLA for Mumbai South Central Constituency No. 180- Mumbai City District) (Legislative Assembly)	08 March 1962	19 November 1962	256 days	Indian National Congress	Yashwantrao II	Yashwantrao Chavan
03		Vasantrao Naik (MLA for Pusad Constituency No. 81- Yavatmal District) (Legislative Assembly)	20 November 1962	24 November 1963	1 year, 4 days	Indian National Congress	Kannamwar l	Marotrao Kannamwar
04		P. K. Sawant (MLA for Chiplun Constituency No. 265- Ratnagiri District) (Legislative Assembly) (Interim Chief Minister)	25 November 1962	04 December 1963	9 days	Indian National Congress	Sawant	P. K. Sawant
05		Shankarrao Chavan (MLA for Bhokar Constituency No. 85- Nanded District) (Legislative Assembly)	05 December 1963	01 March 1967	3 years, 86 days	Indian National Congress	Vasantrao I	Vasantrao Naik
06		Madhukar Dhanaji Chaudhari (MLA for Raver Constituency No. 11- Jalgaon District) (Legislative Assembly)	01 March 1967	27 October 1969	2 years, 240 days	Indian National Congress	Vasantrao II	Vasantrao Naik
07		Balasaheb Desai (MLA for Patan Constituency No. 261- Satara District) (Legislative Assembly)	27 October 1969	13 March 1972	2 years, 138 days	Indian National Congress	Vasantrao II	Vasantrao Naik
08		Vasantrao Naik (MLA for Pusad Constituency No. 81- Yavatmal District) (Legislative Assembly) (Chief Minister)	13 March 1972	04 April 1973	1 year, 32 days	Indian National Congress	Vasantrao III	Vasantrao Naik
09		Narendra Mahipati Tidke (MLA for Savner Constituency No. 49- Nagpur District) (Legislative Assembly)	04 April 1973	17 Match; 1974	347 days	Indian National Congress	Vasantrao III	Vasantrao Naik
10		Vasantrao Naik (MLA for Pusad Constituency No. 81- Yavatmal District) (Legislative Assembly) (Chief Minister)	17 Match; 1974	21 February 1975	341 days	Indian National Congress	Vasantrao III	Vasantrao Naik
11		Sundarrao Solanke (MLA for Majalgaon Constituency No. 229- Beed District) (Legislative Assembly)	21 February 1975	16 April 1977	2 years, 54 days	Indian National Congress	Shankarrao I	Shankarrao Chavan
12		Shivajirao Girdhar Patil (MLA for Shirpur Constituency No. 09- Dhule District (Legislative Assembly)	17 April 1977	07 March 1978	1 year, 324 days	Indian National Congress	Vasantdada I	Vasantdada Patil
13		Sudhakarrao Naik (MLA for Pusad Constituency No. 81- Yavatmal District) (Legislative Assembly)	07 March 1978	18 July 1978	133 days	Indian National Congress	Vasantdada II	Vasantdada Patil
14		Sushilkumar Shinde (MLA for Solapur City Central Constituency No. 249- Solapur District) (Legislative Assembly)	18 July 1978	17 February 1980	1 year, 214 days	Indian Congress (Socialist)	Pawar I	Sharad Pawar
15		Shivajirao Patil Nilangekar (MLA for Nilanga Constituency No. 238- Latur District) (Legislative Assembly)	09 June 1980	21 January 1982	1 year, 226 days	Indian National Congress	Antulay	Abdul Rahman Antulay
16		Surupsingh Hirya Naik (MLA for Navapur Constituency No. 04- Nandurbar District) (Legislative Assembly)	21 January 1982	02 February 1983	1 year, 12 days	Indian National Congress	Bhosale	Babasaheb Bhosale
17		Ramrao Adik (MLC for Elected by MLAs Constituency No. 05 - Ahmednagar District) (Legislative Council) (Deputy Chief Minister)	07 February 1983	05 March 1985	2 years, 26 days	Indian National Congress	Vasantdada III	Vasantdada Patil
18		V. Subramanian (MLA for South Mumbai Constituency No. 121- Mumbai City District) (Legislative Assembly)	12 March 1985	03 June 1985	83 days	Indian National Congress	Vasantdada IV	Vasantdada Patil
19		Vijaysinh Mohite-Patil (MLA for Malshiras Constituency No. 254- Solapur District) (Legislative Assembly)	03 June 1985	12 March 1986	282 days	Indian National Congress	Nilangekar	Shivajirao Patil Nilangekar
20		Vilasrao Deshmukh (MLA for Latur City Constituency No. 235- Latur District) (Legislative Assembly)	12 March 1986	26 June 1988	2 years, 106 days	Indian National Congress	Shankarrao II	Shankarrao Chavan
21		Sharad Pawar (MLA for Baramati Constituency No. 201- Pune District) (Legislative Assembly) (Chief Minister)	26 June 1988	03 March 1990	1 year, 250 days	Indian National Congress	Pawar II	Sharad Pawar
22		Narendra Marutrao Kamble (MLC for Elected by Governor Nominated No. 10 - Mumbai City District) (Legislative Council)	03 March 1990	25 January 1991	328 days	Indian National Congress	Pawar III	Sharad Pawar
23		Jawaharlal Darda (MLC for Elected by MLAs Constituency No. 19 - Yavatmal District) (Legislative Council)	25 January 1991	25 June 1991	151 days	Indian National Congress	Pawar III	Sharad Pawar
24		Sudhakarrao Naik (MLA for Pusad Constituency No. 81- Yavatmal District) (Legislative Assembly) (Chief Minister)	25 June 1991	30 December 1991	188 days	Indian National Congress	Sudhakarrao	Sudhakarrao Naik
25		Arun Mehta (MLC for Elected by MLAs Constituency No. 05 - Mumbai Suburban District) (Legislative Council)	30 December 1991	22 February 1993	1 year, 54 days	Indian National Congress	Sudhakarrao	Sudhakarrao Naik
26		Harshvardhan Deshmukh (MLA for Morshi Constituency No. 43- Amravati District) (Legislative Assembly)	06 March 1993	14 March 1995	2 years, 8 days	Independent Supported Party (Indian National Congress)	Pawar IV	Sharad Pawar
27		Shashikant Sutar (MLA for Shivajinagar Constituency No. 209- Pune District) (Legislative Assembly)	14 March 1995	01 February 1999	3 years, 324 days	Shiv Sena	Joshi	Manohar Joshi
28		Chandrakant Khaire (MLA for Aurangabad West Constituency No. 108- Chhatrapati Sambhaji Nagar District Also Previously Known Aurangabad District (Legislative Assembly)	01 February 1999	11 May 1999	99 days	Shiv Sena	Rane	Narayan Rane
29		Sureshdada Jain (MLA for Jalgaon City Constituency No. 13- Jalgaon District (Legislative Assembly)	11 May 1999	17 October 1999	159 days	Shiv Sena	Rane	Narayan Rane
30		Patangrao Kadam (MLA for Palus-Kadegaon Constituency No. 285- Sangli District) (Legislative Assembly)	19 October 1999	02 March 2001	1 year, 134 days	Indian National Congress	Deshmukh I	Vilasrao Deshmukh
31		Padamsinh Bajirao Patil (MLA for Osmanabad Constituency No. 242- Osmanabad District (Legislative Assembly)	02 March 2001	16 January 2003	1 year, 320 days	Nationalist Congress Party	Deshmukh I	Vilasrao Deshmukh
32		Ganpatrao Deshmukh (MLA for Sangola Constituency No. 235- Solapur District (Legislative Assembly)	18 January 2003	01 November 2004	1 year, 295 days	Peasants and Workers Party of India	Sushilkumar	Sushilkumar Shinde
33		Vilasrao Deshmukh (MLA for Latur City Constituency No. 235- Latur District) (Legislative Assembly) (Chief Minister)	01 November 2004	09 November 2004	8 days	Indian National Congress	Deshmukh II	Vilasrao Deshmukh
34		Surupsingh Hirya Naik (MLA for Navapur Constituency No. 04- Nandurbar District) (Legislative Assembly)	09 November 2004	01 December 2008	4 years, 22 days	Indian National Congress	Deshmukh II	Vilasrao Deshmukh
35		Balasaheb Thorat (MLA for Sangamner Constituency No. 217- Ahmednagar District) (Legislative Assembly)	08 December 2008	06 November 2009	333 days	Indian National Congress	Ashok I	Ashok Chavan
36		Balasaheb Thorat (MLA for Sangamner Constituency No. 217- Ahmednagar District) (Legislative Assembly)	07 November 2009	10 November 2010	1 year, 3 days	Indian National Congress	Ashok II	Ashok Chavan
37		Ramraje Naik Nimbalkar (MLC for Elected by MLAs Constituency No. 14 - Satara District) (Legislative Council)	11 November 2010	07 June 2013	2 years, 208 days	Nationalist Congress Party	Prithviraj	Prithviraj Chavan
38		Ajit Pawar (MLA for Baramati Constituency No. 201- Pune District) (Legislative Assembly) (Deputy Chief Minister); Additional Charge	07 June 2013	11 June 2013	4 days	Nationalist Congress Party	Prithviraj	Prithviraj Chavan
39		Shashikant Shinde (MLA for Koregaon Constituency No. 257- Satara District) (Legislative Assembly)	11 June 2013	26 September 2014	1 year, 107 days	Nationalist Congress Party	Prithviraj	Prithviraj Chavan
40		Pankaja Munde (MLA for Parli Constituency No. 233- Beed District) (Legislative Assembly)	31 October 2014	08 July 2016	1 year, 251 days	Bharatiya Janata Party	Fadnavis I	Devendra Fadnavis
41		Ram Shinde (MLA for Karjat Jamkhed Constituency No. 127- Ahmednagar District) (Legislative Assembly)	08 July 2016	16 June 2019	2 years, 343 days	Bharatiya Janata Party	Fadnavis I	Devendra Fadnavis
42		Tanaji Sawant (MLC for Yavatmal Local Authorities Constituency No. 17 - Dharashiv District Also Previously Known Osmanabad District (Legislative Council)	16 June 2019	12 November 2019	149 days	Shiv Sena	Fadnavis I	Devendra Fadnavis
43		Devendra Fadnavis (MLA for Nagpur South West Constituency No. 52- Nagpur District) (Legislative Assembly) (Chief_Minister); In Charge	23 November 2019	28 November 2019	5 days	Bharatiya Janata Party	Fadnavis II	Devendra Fadnavis
44		Eknath Shinde (MLA for Kopri-Pachpakhadi Constituency No. 147- Thane District) (Legislative Assembly)	28 November 2019	30 December 2019	32 days	Shiv Sena (2022–present)	Thackeray	Uddhav Thackeray
45		Shankarrao Gadakh (MLA for Nevasa Constituency No. 221- Ahmednagar District) (Legislative Assembly)	30 December 2019	29 June 2022	2 years, 181 days	Independent Supported Party (Shiv Sena)	Thackeray	Uddhav Thackeray
46		Eknath Shinde (MLA for Kopri-Pachpakhadi Constituency No. 147- Thane District) (Legislative Assembly) (Chief Minister); In Charge	30 June 2022	14 August 2022	45 days	Shiv Sena (2022–present)	Eknath	Eknath Shinde
47		Eknath Shinde (MLA for Kopri-Pachpakhadi Constituency No. 147- Thane District) (Legislative Assembly) (Chief Minister)	14 August 2022	14 July 2023	334 days	Shiv Sena (2022–present)	Eknath	Eknath Shinde
48		Sanjay Rathod (MLA for Digras Constituency No. 79- Yavatmal District (Legislative Assembly)	14 July 2023	26 November 2024	1 year, 135 days	Shiv Sena (2022–present)	Eknath	Eknath Shinde
49		Devendra Fadnavis (MLA for Nagpur South West Constituency No. 52- Nagpur District) (Legislative Assembly) (Chief_Minister); In Charge	05 December 2024	21 December 2024	16 days	Bharatiya Janata Party	Fadnavis III	Devendra Fadnavis
50		Sanjay Rathod (MLA for Digras Constituency No. 79- Yavatmal District (Legislative Assembly)	21 December 2024	Incumbent	1 year, 261 days	Shiv Sena (Shinde Group)	Fadnavis III	Devendra Fadnavis

== Ministers of State ==
No.	Portrait	Deputy Minister (Constituency)	Term of office			Political party	Ministry	Minister	Chief Minister
No.	Portrait	Deputy Minister (Constituency)	From	To	Period	Political party	Ministry	Minister	Chief Minister
Deputy Minister of Soil and Water Conservation
Vacant			23 November 2019	28 November 2019	5 days	NA	Fadnavis II	Devendra Fadnavis	Devendra Fadnavis
01		Dattatray Vithoba Bharne (MLA for Indapur Constituency No. 200- Pune District (Legislative Assembly)	30 December 2019	29 June 2022	2 years, 181 days	Nationalist Congress Party	Thackeray	Shankarrao Gadakh	Uddhav Thackeray
Vacant			30 June 2022	26 November 2024	2 years, 149 days	NA	Eknath	Eknath Shinde (2022 - 2023); Sanjay Rathod (2023–2024)	Eknath Shinde
02		Indranil Naik (MLA for Pusad Constituency No. 81- Yavatmal District) (Legislative Assembly)	21 December 2024	Incumbent	1 year, 261 days	Nationalist Congress Party (Ajit Pawar Group)	Fadnavis III	Sanjay Rathod (2024–Present)	Devendra Fadnavis
