= Dahake =

Dahake is a surname. People with the name include:

- Prakash Dahake, Indian politician
- Radhabai Dahake (1910–1983), Indian community leader in London
- Sai Prakash Dahake, Indian politician
- Sujay Dahake, Indian film director and editor
- Vasant Abaji Dahake, Marathi Poet
