= Washim Assembly constituency =

Constituency of the Maharashtra legislative assembly in India

Coordinates: 20.11°N 77.13°E

Washim
- Constituency No. 34 for the Maharashtra Legislative Assembly

Constituency details
- Country: India
- Region: Western India
- State: Maharashtra
- District: Washim
- Lok Sabha constituency: Yavatmal-Washim
- Established: 1952
- Total electors: 369,051
- Reservation: SC

Member of Legislative Assembly
- 15th Maharashtra Legislative Assembly
- Incumbent Shyam Ramcharan Khode
- Party: BJP
- Alliance: NDA
- Elected year: 2024

Washim Assembly constituency is one of the 288 constituencies of the Maharashtra Vidhan Sabha and one of the three which are located in Washim district. It is reserved for candidates from the Scheduled Castes.

It is a part of Yavatmal-Washim Lok Sabha constituency with the adjoining Yavatmal district along with five other Vidhan Sabha assembly constituencies, viz. Karanja, Ralegaon (ST), Yavatmal (ST), Digras and Pusad.

As per orders of Delimitation of Parliamentary and Assembly constituencies Order, 2008, No. 34 Washim Assembly constituency is composed of the following: 1. Mangrulpir Tehsil, 2. Washim Tehsil of the district.

== Members of Legislative Assembly ==
Year	Member	Party
1952	Shankar Sadashiv Kulkarni; Maroti Kashiram Khirade	Indian National Congress
1957	Rajurkar Jaisingrao Dinkarrao; Salwe Rambhau Chinkaji (Sc)	Indian National Congress
1962	Ramrao Gopalrao Zanak	Indian National Congress
1967	Manabai Maroti Khirade	Indian National Congress
1972	Bhimrao Mahadeo Katke	Indian National Congress
1978	Wankhede Bhaurao Nagorao	Indian National Congress (I)
1980	Dhendule Rameshwar Prabhati	Indian National Congress (I)
1985	Kamble Bhimrao Haibati	Indian National Congress
1990	Lakhan Malik	Bharatiya Janata Party
1995	Rajguru Purushottam Namdev	Bharatiya Janata Party
1999	Prof. Shikhre Yadavrao Punjaji	Bharatiya Janata Party
2004	Suresh Bhivaji Ingle	Indian National Congress
2009	Lakhan Malik	Bharatiya Janata Party
2014	Lakhan Malik	Bharatiya Janata Party
2019	Lakhan Malik	Bharatiya Janata Party
2024	Shyam Khode	Bharatiya Janata Party

Madhya Pradesh
Bombay State

== Election results ==
=== Assembly Election 2024 ===
2024 Maharashtra Legislative Assembly election : Washim
Party	Candidate	Votes	%	±%
BJP	Shyam Khode	122,914	50.21%	▲17.98
SS(UBT)	Siddharth Akaramji Deole	103,040	42.09%	New
VBA	Megha Kiran Dongare	9,264	3.78%	▼21.78
MNS	Gajanan Nivrutti Vairagade	1,517	0.62%	New
NOTA	None of the above	507	0.21%	▼0.52
Margin of victory		19,874	8.12%	▲1.45
Turnout		245,331	66.48%	▲7.25
Total valid votes		244,824		
Registered electors		369,051		▲5.66
BJP hold		Swing	▲17.98	

=== Assembly Election 2019 ===
2019 Maharashtra Legislative Assembly election : Washim
Party	Candidate	Votes	%	±%
BJP	Lakhan Malik	66,159	32.23%	▲6.27
VBA	Siddharth Akaramji Deole	52,464	25.56%	New
Independent	Shashikant Yashwantrao Pendharkar	45,407	22.12%	New
INC	Rajani Mahadev Rathod	30,716	14.97%	▼4.41
CPI	Dr. Bharat Laxman Nandure	1,655	0.81%	▼0.20
NOTA	None of the above	1,491	0.73%	▲0.12
Independent	Sachin Wamanrao Pattebahadur	1,411	0.69%	New
Vidarbh Maza Party	Mahada Ashru Hiwale	1,411	0.69%	New
Independent	Bhalerao Dipak Ramesh	1,314	0.64%	New
Margin of victory		13,695	6.67%	▲4.30
Turnout		206,889	59.23%	▲1.84
Total valid votes		205,242		
Registered electors		349,279		▲7.21
BJP hold		Swing	▲6.27	

=== Assembly Election 2014 ===
2014 Maharashtra Legislative Assembly election : Washim
Party	Candidate	Votes	%	±%
BJP	Lakhan Malik	48,196	25.96%	▼17.14
SS	Nilesh Alias Shashikant Pendharkar	43,803	23.60%	New
INC	Suresh Bhivaji Ingale	35,968	19.38%	▼7.70
NCP	Dr. Dipak Yashvantrao Dhoke	21,690	11.68%	New
BBM	Milind Pakhale	13,276	7.15%	▲5.93
MNS	Dnyaneshwar Namdev Jhadhav	11,463	6.17%	New
BSP	Rahul Chokha Bhagat	2,062	1.11%	▲0.11
CPI	Sanjay Janrao Mandavdhare	1,877	1.01%	New
NOTA	None of the above	1,130	0.61%	New
Margin of victory		4,393	2.37%	▼13.65
Turnout		186,954	57.39%	▲2.86
Total valid votes		185,641		
Registered electors		325,785		▲17.42
BJP hold		Swing	▼17.14	

=== Assembly Election 2009 ===
2009 Maharashtra Legislative Assembly election : Washim
Party	Candidate	Votes	%	±%
BJP	Lakhan Malik	65,174	43.10%	▲14.15
INC	Dr. Alka Satyabhan Makasare	40,945	27.08%	▼10.04
Independent	Mahadeo Haribhau Tatke	20,645	13.65%	New
Independent	Mane Samadhan Tryambak	15,404	10.19%	New
BBM	Gawai Madhao Samarth	1,846	1.22%	▼3.73
BSP	Belkhede Lata Babarao	1,513	1.00%	▼3.86
RPI(A)	Adhagale Pralhad Narayan	1,270	0.84%	New
Independent	Kamble Madhukar Anandrao	1,217	0.80%	New
Margin of victory		24,229	16.02%	▲7.85
Turnout		151,310	54.53%	▼4.13
Total valid votes		151,228		
Registered electors		277,460		▲43.40
BJP gain from INC		Swing	▲5.98	

=== Assembly Election 2004 ===
2004 Maharashtra Legislative Assembly election : Washim
Party	Candidate	Votes	%	±%
INC	Suresh Bhivaji Ingle	42,131	37.12%	New
BJP	Motiram Saudagar Tupsande	32,859	28.95%	▼15.14
Independent	Lakhan Sahadev Malik	23,641	20.83%	New
BBM	Jumade Madhukar Kacharuji	5,619	4.95%	▼23.26
BSP	Adv. Ingole Sanjay Shivaram	5,519	4.86%	New
Independent	Manaar Raju Abhiman	973	0.86%	New
Independent	Dakhore Keshav	864	0.76%	New
Margin of victory		9,272	8.17%	▼7.71
Turnout		113,511	58.66%	▼5.68
Total valid votes		113,487		
Registered electors		193,492		▲12.22
INC gain from BJP		Swing	▼6.97	

=== Assembly Election 1999 ===
1999 Maharashtra Legislative Assembly election : Washim
Party	Candidate	Votes	%	±%
BJP	Prof. Shikhre Yadavrao Punjaji	45,181	44.09%	▲5.30
BBM	Jumde Madhukar Kachruji	28,911	28.21%	New
NCP	Balajirao Ganpatrao Dange (Guruji)	12,477	12.18%	New
Independent	Rajguru Purshottam Namdev	7,783	7.60%	New
Independent	Sonone Ramprabhu Suryabhanji	4,479	4.37%	New
Independent	Noorali Maheboobali Shah	3,641	3.55%	New
Margin of victory		16,270	15.88%	▲2.43
Turnout		110,932	64.34%	▼10.05
Total valid votes		102,472		
Registered electors		172,423		▲7.57
BJP hold		Swing	▲5.30	

=== Assembly Election 1995 ===
1995 Maharashtra Legislative Assembly election : Washim
Party	Candidate	Votes	%	±%
BJP	Rajguru Purushottam Namdev	44,928	38.79%	▲3.14
INC	Sathe Chandrakant Shripatrao	29,346	25.34%	▼5.28
Independent	Kamble Madhukar Anandrao	9,513	8.21%	New
BBM	Jamdhade Tukaram Kachru	7,465	6.45%	New
Independent	Raut Motiram Bondu	7,360	6.35%	New
BSP	Sonone Ramprabhu Suryabhanji	4,451	3.84%	New
JD	Atote Gopalrao Sukhdeorao	4,280	3.70%	▼8.88
Independent	Laxman Maroti Padghan	1,561	1.35%	New
Margin of victory		15,582	13.45%	▲8.42
Turnout		119,233	74.39%	▲18.37
Total valid votes		115,816		
Registered electors		160,289		▲13.53
BJP hold		Swing	▲3.14	

=== Assembly Election 1990 ===
1990 Maharashtra Legislative Assembly election : Washim
Party	Candidate	Votes	%	±%
BJP	Lakhan Malik	27,668	35.65%	New
INC	Kamble Bhimrao Haibati	23,761	30.62%	▼11.14
JD	Madhukar Anandrao Kamble	9,765	12.58%	New
BRP	Jumde Keshaorao Kachruji	8,941	11.52%	New
Independent	Chimankar Keshaorao Narayanrao	2,180	2.81%	New
Independent	Undre Kisan Ramji	1,116	1.44%	New
Independent	Annapurnabai Kashinath Kankal	979	1.26%	New
Independent	Lawale Narayan Govinda	925	1.19%	New
Margin of victory		3,907	5.03%	▲3.24
Turnout		79,097	56.02%	▲2.80
Total valid votes		77,601		
Registered electors		141,183		▲27.08
BJP gain from INC		Swing	▼6.11	

=== Assembly Election 1985 ===
1985 Maharashtra Legislative Assembly election : Washim
Party	Candidate	Votes	%	±%
INC	Kamble Bhimrao Haibati	24,267	41.76%	New
IC(S)	Sonone Ramprabhoo Suryabhan	23,225	39.97%	New
Independent	Munde Shatrughna Shankar	9,417	16.20%	New
Independent	Ingle Madhuri Namdeo	649	1.12%	New
Independent	Aware Prabhakar Umaji	554	0.95%	New
Margin of victory		1,042	1.79%	▼40.40
Turnout		59,131	53.22%	▲12.95
Total valid votes		58,112		
Registered electors		111,097		▲11.34
INC gain from INC(I)		Swing	▼21.54	

=== Assembly Election 1980 ===
1980 Maharashtra Legislative Assembly election : Washim
Party	Candidate	Votes	%	±%
INC(I)	Dhendule Rameshwar Prabhati	24,652	63.30%	▲14.23
BJP	Ganpatrao Kanhuji Dhole	8,222	21.11%	New
INC(U)	Govinda Bhaguji Wankhade	2,872	7.37%	New
RPI(K)	Ingale Arvinda Shivram	2,369	6.08%	▼17.79
Independent	Kamble Madhukar Anand	579	1.49%	New
Margin of victory		16,430	42.19%	▲16.99
Turnout		40,180	40.27%	▼18.38
Total valid votes		38,943		
Registered electors		99,778		▲7.56
INC(I) hold		Swing	▲14.23	

=== Assembly Election 1978 ===
1978 Maharashtra Legislative Assembly election : Washim
Party	Candidate	Votes	%	±%
INC(I)	Wankhede Bhaurao Nagorao	25,797	49.07%	New
RPI(K)	Khobragade Bhaurao Nathuji	12,548	23.87%	New
Independent	Gaikwad Shiwaji Shamji	7,987	15.19%	New
RPI	Tayade Vijaykumar Babanji	2,232	4.25%	New
Independent	Jadho Sonaji Punjaji	1,132	2.15%	New
Independent	Dabhade Rambhau Fakira	853	1.62%	New
Independent	Padghan Pandurang Ramji	538	1.02%	New
Independent	Tayade Dharmraj Vyankatesh	505	0.96%	New
Margin of victory		13,249	25.20%	▼37.82
Turnout		54,403	58.65%	▲7.58
Total valid votes		52,569		
Registered electors		92,761		▼4.49
INC(I) gain from INC		Swing	▼29.98	

=== Assembly Election 1972 ===
1972 Maharashtra Legislative Assembly election : Washim
Party	Candidate	Votes	%	±%
INC	Bhimrao Mahadeo Katke	37,802	79.05%	▲20.86
ABJS	Baliram G. Risodkar	7,665	16.03%	▲3.01
INC(O)	Dharamaraj V. Tayade	2,351	4.92%	New
Margin of victory		30,137	63.02%	▲28.34
Turnout		49,606	51.07%	▲0.09
Total valid votes		47,818		
Registered electors		97,126		▲23.51
INC hold		Swing	▲20.86	

=== Assembly Election 1967 ===
1967 Maharashtra Legislative Assembly election : Washim
Party	Candidate	Votes	%	±%
INC	Manabai Maroti Khirade	21,671	58.19%	▼3.65
RPI	V. K. Gaikwad	8,758	23.52%	New
ABJS	H. S. Jamne	4,849	13.02%	New
Independent	S. N. Taktode	732	1.97%	New
Independent	D. V. Tayade	708	1.90%	New
Independent	B. N. Deokate	375	1.01%	New
Margin of victory		12,913	34.68%	▼9.15
Turnout		40,088	50.98%	▼18.64
Total valid votes		37,240		
Registered electors		78,639		▲17.06
INC hold		Swing	▼3.65	

=== Assembly Election 1962 ===
1962 Maharashtra Legislative Assembly election : Washim
Party	Candidate	Votes	%	±%
INC	Ramrao Gopalrao Zanak	26,891	61.84%	▲18.17
Independent	Dattatraya Krishnarao Abooj	7,832	18.01%	New
Independent	Ganpat Kamaji Shinde	4,694	10.79%	New
ABJS	Yadavrao Keshvrao Gote	4,068	9.35%	New
Margin of victory		19,059	43.83%	▲39.74
Turnout		46,771	69.62%	▼55.45
Total valid votes		43,485		
Registered electors		67,179		▼46.40
INC hold		Swing	▲38.18	

=== Assembly Election 1957 ===
1957 Bombay State Legislative Assembly election : Washim
Party	Candidate	Votes	%	±%
INC	Rajurkar Jaisingrao Dinkarrao	37,078	23.66%	▼21.12
INC	Salwe Rambhau Chinkaji	31,371	20.01%	▼24.77
Independent	Zanak Ramrao Gopalrao	30,662	19.56%	New
Independent	Awachar Sakharam Hari	20,473	13.06%	New
SCF	Mankikar Khushalrao Bhikaji	14,228	9.08%	▼5.65
ABJS	Jadhao Tulsiram Zelaji	10,364	6.61%	▼14.02
Independent	Vaidya Shamrao Uttamrao	6,523	4.16%	New
Independent	Naik Dattatraya Govind	6,045	3.86%	New
Margin of victory		6,416	4.09%	▲2.08
Turnout		156,744	125.07%	▲12.07
Total valid votes		156,744		
Registered electors		125,330		▲26.62
INC hold		Swing	▲0.27	

=== Assembly Election 1952 ===
1952 Hyderabad State Legislative Assembly election : Washim
Party	Candidate	Votes	%	±%
INC	Shankar Sadashiv Kulkarni	26,167	23.39%	New
INC	Maroti Kashiram Khirade	23,917	21.38%	New
ABJS	Narayan Vithoba Khadse	23,070	20.63%	New
SCF	Sakharam Hari Awachat	16,475	14.73%	New
Independent	Rambhau Chinkaji Salve	7,780	6.96%	New
Socialist	Vishwanath Jairam Gurhalkar	5,771	5.16%	New
SKP	Shantabai Vithal Nawalikar	4,509	4.03%	New
Independent	Dattatraya Govind Naik	2,192	1.96%	New
Independent	Gangaram Pandurang Rajguru	1,972	1.76%	New
Margin of victory		2,250	2.01%	
Turnout		111,853	113.00%	
Total valid votes		111,853		
Registered electors		98,981		
INC win (new seat)				

== See also ==
- Washim
