= Ram Patil Ratolikar =

Indian politician

Member of Maharashtra Legislative Council
- Incumbent
- Assumed office 27 July 2018
- Preceded by: Manikrao Thakre, Indian National Congress

Personal details
- Party: Bharatiya Janata Party

Ram Patil Ratolikar is an Indian politician and belongs to the Bharatiya Janata Party. On 10 July 2018, he was elected unopposed with 10 others to the Maharashtra Legislative Council.
