= Rajendra Sukhanand Patni =

Indian politician (1964–2024)

Rajendra Patni

Member of Maharashtra Legislative Assembly
- In office (2004–2009), (2014–2019), (2019–2024)
- Preceded by: Babasaheb Dhabekar; Prakash Dahake
- Succeeded by: Sai Prakash Dahake
- Constituency: Karanja

Member of Maharashtra Legislative Council
- In office 1997–2003
- Constituency: Maharashtra

Personal details
- Born: 19 June 1964 Karanja Lad, Washim District, Maharashtra, India
- Died: 23 February 2024 (aged 59) Mumbai
- Party: Bharatiya Janata Party (2014-2024)
- Other political affiliations: Shiv Sena (Before 2014)
- Spouse: Babita Patni
- Children: 2
- Education: Graduate B.Com From R.A. Arts & College Washim Nagpur in 1984 and SSC From Shree Bakliwal Vidyalay Washim Nagpur In 1979
- Occupation: Business & Social Worker

Rajendra Sukhanand Patni (19 June 1964 – 23 February 2024) was an Indian politician of the Bharatiya Janata Party (BJP). He was a Member of the Legislative Assembly from Karanja constituency of Washim District in Maharashtra. He was also the member of the Legislative Council from 1997 to 2003. He won the 2004, 2014 and 2019 Legislative Assembly elections from Karanja. He also succeeded in becoming the President of the Municipal Council in 2011 and 2014.

Rajendra Sukhanand Patni died on 23 February 2024, in Mumbai at the age of 59.

== Within BJP ==
- President, Washim District BJP, (since 2016)

== Legislative career ==
- Elected to Maharashtra Legislative Council – 1997 to 2003 (1st Term)
- Elected to Maharashtra Legislative Assembly – 2004 to 2009 (1st Term)
- Re-Elected to Maharashtra Legislative Assembly – 2014 to 2019 (2nd Term)
- Re-Elected to Maharashtra Legislative Assembly – 2019 to 2024 (3rd Term)
