= Madan Yerawar =

Indian politician

Member of Maharashtra Legislative Assembly
- In office (2014-2019), (2019 – 2024)
- Preceded by: Nandini Nilesh Deshmukh Parvekar
- Succeeded by: Balasaheb Mangulkar
- Constituency: Yavatmal
- In office (2004–2009)
- Preceded by: Kirti Gandhi
- Succeeded by: Nilesh Shivram Deshmukh Parvekar
- Constituency: Yavatmal

Minister of state Government of Maharashtra
- In office 8 July 2016 – 8 November 2019
- Department: Public Works; Energy; Tourism; Food & Drug Administration

Personal details
- Born: 26 January 1963 (age 63) Yavatmal, Maharashtra
- Party: Bharatiya Janata Party
- Spouse: Minaltai Yerawar
- Children: 2 Daughters
- Parent(s): Madhukarao Govindrao Yerawar (Father); Minaltai M. Yerawar (Mother)
- Education: Diploma in Pharmacy

Madan Madhukarrao Yerawar is a member of the 14th Maharashtra Legislative Assembly from Yavatmal (Vidhan Sabha constituency) serving his third term as MLA.

Madan Yerawar was made Minister of State in First Fadnavis ministry for Energy, Tourism, Food and Drugs Administration and Public work. He held this position during October 2014 to November 2019.

He has been a former member of the Assembly from Yavatmal in 2004 by defeating MLA Kirti Gandhi of INC.

His victory was amongst the five seats won by the BJP, that resulted in the Indian National Congress (INC) not being able to win a single seat in Yavatmal district once its stronghold.

He is a stakeholder in Chintamani Agrotech a company involved in power generation in Yavatmal, a company that had Nitin Gadkari as one of its directors. He is considered as a "protege'" of Gadkari, and the 2014 contest had been considered as a "prestige issue" for Gadkari and Ajit Pawar whose mentee Sandeep Bajoria was pitted against him. He was also a guardian minister of Buldhana district & Yavatmal district which is located in Vidharbha Maharashtra India.
