= Sanjay Deshmukh =

Indian politician

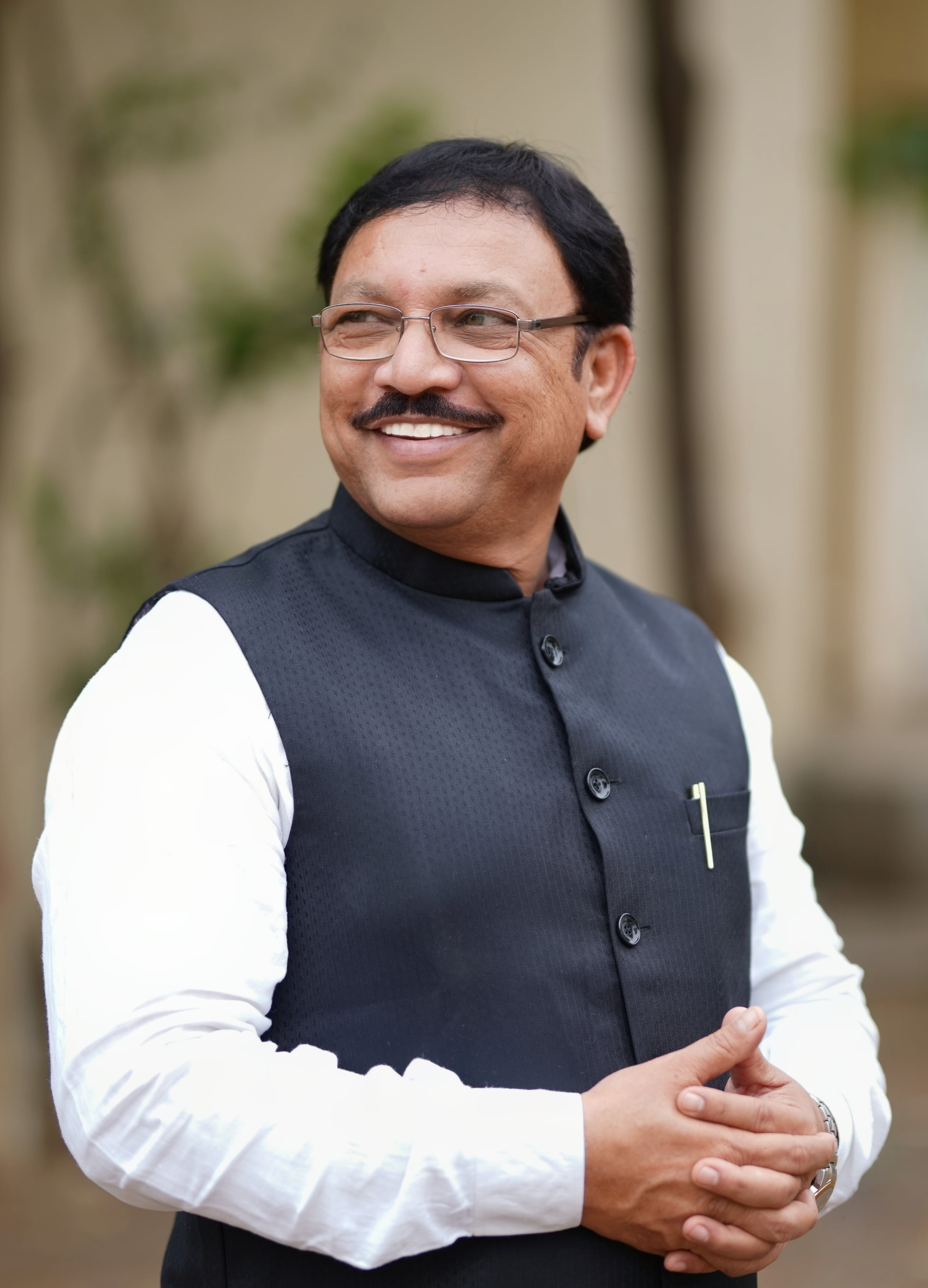

Member of Parliament, Lok Sabha
- Incumbent
- Assumed office 4 June 2024
- Preceded by: Bhavana Gawali
- Constituency: Yavatmal–Washim

Chairman of The Yavatmal District Central Co-Operative Bank Ltd
- Incumbent
- Assumed office 2 November 2026
- Preceded by: Manish Uttamrao Patil

Member of Maharashtra Legislative Assembly
- In office 1999–2009
- Preceded by: Shrikant Wamanrao Munginwar
- Succeeded by: Sanjay Dulichand Rathod
- Constituency: Digras

Minister of State Government of Maharashtra
- In office 2001–2004
- Minister: Ministry of Sports & Youth welfare
- Cabinet: First Deshmukh ministry Sushilkumar Shinde ministry
- Chief Minister: Vilasrao Deshmukh Sushilkumar Shinde

Personal details
- Born: Sanjay Uttamrao Deshmukh; 21 April 1968 (age 58) At.Chincholi, Digras Taluka, Yavatmal District
- Party: Shiv Sena (2022) (June 2026-Present), (1996-1999)
- Other political affiliations: Shiv Sena(UBT) (2022-2026); Bharatiya Janata Party (2017-2019); Indian National Congress (2009-2017), (1992-1996); Independent (1999-2009), (2019-2022)
- Spouse: Vaishalitai Sanjayrao Deshmukh
- Children: 2
- Education: B.Com from B.b Arts N.b Commerce & B.p Science College, Digras in 1988.
- Occupation: Agriculture, S&D Industries, Politician & Social Worker
- Website: Official website

Sanjay Uttamrao Deshmukh (born 21 April 1968) is an Indian politician. He was a member of the Maharashtra Legislative Assembly from the Digras constituency of Maharashtra in 1999 and 2004. He is the founder of Ishwar Deshmukh Foundation. He is a Director of Yavatmal District Central Cooperative Bank since 2008 and he is elected from Digras branch constituency.

== Early life and background ==
Sanjay Uttamrao Deshmukh, also called Sanjay Bhau, was born in Chincholi, Digras on 21 April 1968. He is one of the four children of Uttamrao Khushalrao Deshmukh (Police Patil) and Savitabai Deshmukh. He completed his schooling from Dinbai Vidyalaya, Digras and his graduation in Bachelor of commerce from Amravati University. He is married to Vaishalitai Sanjayrao Deshmukh. The couple has two children.

== Political career ==
He joined active politics at the age of 28. Deshmukh became Digras Shiv Sena taluka chief in 1996 and also became the district President of Shiv Sena from Yavatmal District in 1996. He first won the election from Digras Assembly constituency in 1999 with a margin of 126 votes as an independent MLA against NCP candidate Khwaja Baig. He has served as the minister of sports from 2002 to 2004. In 2004 he got elected for a second term as an independent MLA of Digras Assembly constituency with 2,518 votes against Shiv Sena MLA Shreekant Munginwar.

After that, his success in politics and his followers never stopped rising. In 2001, he became the State Sports Minister of Maharashtra. From his initial days in politics, he has been involved in social activities. He founded the Ishvar foundation and Shri.Durgamata Bahuudeshiya Krida and Shaikshanik Sanstha, Ishwar Deshmukh Institute of Pharmacy, Digras in the year 2003 which provides free education and food to poor, underprivileged children.

== Work ==
He is founder of charitable trusts such as, Sanjay Bhau Mitra Mandal, Ishwar Pratishthan, and Ishwar Deshmukh foundation. These trusts organize self-employment creation workshops, women safety workshops and provide education and training to children and women of poor and backward classes.
