= Manohar Naik =

Indian politician

Manoharrao Naik

Member of Maharashtra Legislative Assembly
- In office (2001-2004), (2004-2009), (2009-2014), (2014 – 2019)
- Preceded by: Sudhakarrao Naik
- Succeeded by: Indranil Naik
- Constituency: Pusad
- In office (1995–1999)
- Preceded by: Sudhakarrao Naik
- Succeeded by: Sudhakarrao Naik
- Constituency: Pusad

Cabinet Minister Government of Maharashtra
- In office Nov 2004 – Dec 2008
- Minister: Minister of Food and Drug Administration.
- Preceded by: R. R. Patil

Cabinet Minister Second Ashok Chavan ministry Government of Maharashtra
- In office Dec 2008 – Nov 2010
- Minister: Minister of Food and Drug Administration.

Cabinet Minister Government of Maharashtra
- In office Nov 2010 – Sep 2014
- Minister: Minister of Food and Drug Administration.
- Succeeded by: Radhakrishna Vikhe Patil

Guardian Minister of Nandurbar district
- In office (1 Nov 2004 – 4 Nov 2008)

Guardian Minister of Yavatmal District
- In office (8 Dec 2008 – 6 Nov 2009)

Personal details
- Born: March 9, 1942 (age 84) Gahuli village, Yavatmal district, Maharashtra, India

Manohar Rajusingh Naik is an Indian politician of the Nationalist Congress Party in the state of Maharashtra. The Naik family has not lost the Pusad (Vidhan Sabha constituency) Seat since 1952.

The Naik family has tremendous influence over Banjara community, a scheduled tribe, which is in significant number in Yavatmal and a deciding factor in Pusad constituency.

== Personal life ==
Naik was born in 1943 at the remote Yawali village near Chapdoh dam, 3 km from Karegaon on Karegaon-Ramnagar-Yawali link road off Yavatmal-Ghatanji State highway MH SH 237, in the Yavatmal district in the southern Vidarbha region of Maharashtra. He is nephew of former Chief Minister of Maharashtra Vasantrao Naik and brother of former Chief Minister of Maharashtra Sudhakarrao Naik.

== Career ==
Naik has been elected as Member of the Legislative Assembly from the Pusad (Vidhan Sabha constituency) of the Maharashtra Legislative Assembly in Yavatmal district from 1995 to 1999, 2004–2009, 2009–2014, and 2014–2019.

From 2009 to 2014, he was the Minister of Food and Drug Administration in the Government of Maharashtra in India.

He is a Managing Committee member of the Janta Shikshan Prasarak Mandal and the Babasaheb Naik College of Engineering, Pusad.

Preceded by	Minister of Food and Drug Administration; 7 November 2009 – 30 October 2015	Succeeded by Girish Bapat
