= Lakhan Sahadeo Malik =

Indian politician

Lakhan Malik

Member of Maharashtra Legislative Assembly
- In office (1990-1995), (2009-2014), (2014-2019), (2019 – 2024)
- Preceded by: Bhimrao Kamble
- Succeeded by: Shyam Ramcharan Khode
- Constituency: Washim (Vidhan Sabha constituency)

Personal details
- Born: 20 January 1964 (age 62) Washim, Maharashtra, India
- Party: Bharatiya Janata Party
- Children: Nitesh, Vijay, Rohit
- Occupation: Politician

Lakhan Sahadeo Malik is a member of Maharashtra Legislative Assembly. He represents the Washim Assembly Constituency. He belongs to the Bharatiya Janata Party.
