= Balasaheb Mangulkar =

Indian politician

Member of Maharashtra Legislative Assembly
- Incumbent
- Assumed office 20 Nov 2024 - Present
- Preceded by: Madan Yerawar
- Constituency: Yavatmal

Personal details
- Born: Anil Shankarrao Mangulkar; 4 December 1958 (age 67) At.Bhari (Talegaon), Tq.Yavatmal, Dist.Yavatmal District, Maharashtra
- Party: Indian National Congress
- Children: 1 Daughter (Dhwaneeka Mangulkar)
- Education: 12th Pass From Anglo Hindi High School, Yavatmal

Anil alias Balasaheb Shankarao Mangulkar (born 4 December1958) is an Indian politician from Maharashtra. He is a member of the Maharashtra Legislative Assembly from Yavatmal Assembly constituency in Yavatmal district. He won the 2024 Maharashtra Legislative Assembly election representing the Indian National Congress.

== Early life and education ==
Balasaheb Mangulkar is from a small village, Bhaari, near Yavatmal city. His father Shankarrao Baliramji Mangulkar was a farmer. He passed Class 12 from Anglo Hindi High School, Yavatmal. He is considered to be a close associate of former three consecutive terms Rajya Sabha member Vijay Darda & his late father former four terms Member of Maharashtra Legislative Council and cabinet Minister Jawaharlal Darda Babuji and Darda Family of Yavatmal and He was also close associate and friend of former MLA of Yavatmal Late. Nilesh Deshmukh Parvekar.

== Political career ==
Balasaheb Mangulkar lost by a margin of 2,253 votes to Madan Yerawar of the BJP in the 2019 Maharashtra Legislative Assembly election. But he won the next election from Yavatmal representing Indian National Congress in the 2024 Maharashtra Legislative Assembly election. He polled 117,504 votes and defeated his nearest rival, Madan Madhukar Yerawar of the Bharatiya Janata Party, by a margin of 11,381 votes.
