= Shyam Ramcharan Khode =

Indian politician

Member of Maharashtra Legislative Assembly
- Incumbent
- Assumed office 2024-Present
- Preceded by: Lakhan Sahadeo Malik
- Constituency: Washim (Vidhan Sabha constituency)

Shyam Ramcharan Khode (born 1966) is an Indian politician from Maharashtra. He is an MLA from Washim Assembly constituency, which is a reserved constituency for Scheduled Caste community, in Washim district. He won the 2024 Maharashtra Legislative Assembly election representing the Bharatiya Janata Party.

== Early life and education ==
Khode is from Washim, Maharashtra. He is the son of Ramcharan Narayan Khode. He studied Class 10 at Z.P. (M.S.) Secondary School and Junior College, Mangrulpir, Washim and passed the examinations conducted by the Nagpur Board in 1984.

== Political career ==
Shyam khode is a member of the Rashtriya Swayamsevak Sangh (RSS), a far-right Hindu nationalist paramilitary volunteer organisation.

Shyam Khode won from Washim Assembly constituency representing the Bharatiya Janata Party in the 2024 Maharashtra Legislative Assembly election. He polled 122,914 votes and defeated his nearest rival, Siddharth Akaramji Deole of the Shiv Sena (UBT), by a margin of 19,873 votes.
