= Karanja Assembly constituency =

Constituency of the Maharashtra legislative assembly in India

Coordinates: 20.48°N 77.48°E

Karanja
- Constituency No. 35 for the Maharashtra Legislative Assembly

Constituency details
- Country: India
- Region: Western India
- State: Maharashtra
- District: Washim
- Lok Sabha constituency: Yavatmal-Washim
- Established: 1978
- Total electors: 316,493
- Reservation: None

Member of Legislative Assembly
- 15th Maharashtra Legislative Assembly
- Incumbent Sai Prakash Dahake
- Party: BJP
- Alliance: NDA
- Elected year: 2024

Karanja Assembly constituency is one of the 288 constituencies of Maharashtra Vidhan Sabha and one of the three which are located in Washim district. On 23 February 2024, Karanja Assembly constituency seat got Vacant as the Death of sitting MLA Rajendra Patni.

It is a part of the Yavatmal-Washim (Lok Sabha constituency) with the adjoining Yavatmal district along with five other Vidhan Sabha assembly constituencies, viz. Washim (SC), Ralegaon (ST), Yavatmal (ST), Digras and Pusad.

As per orders of Delimitation of Parliamentary and Assembly constituencies Order, 2008, No. 35 Karanja Assembly constituency is composed of the following: 1. Karanja Tehsil, 2. Manora Tehsil of the district.

== Members of Legislative assembly ==
Year	Member	Party
1978	Arvind Deshmukh	All India Forward Bloc
1980	Ramkrishna Rathi	Indian National Congress (I)
1985	Anantrao Deshmukh	Indian National Congress
1990	Gulabrao Gawande	Shiv Sena
1995	Babasaheb Dhabekar	Independent politician
1999	Babasaheb Dhabekar	Indian National Congress
2004	Rajendra Patni	Shiv Sena
2009	Prakash Dahake	Nationalist Congress Party
2014	Rajendra Patni	Bharatiya Janata Party
2019	Rajendra Patni	Bharatiya Janata Party
2024	Sai Prakash Dahake	Bharatiya Janata Party

== Election results ==
=== Assembly Election 2024 ===
2024 Maharashtra Legislative Assembly election : Karanja
Party	Candidate	Votes	%	±%
BJP	Sai Prakash Dahake	85,005	40.79%	▲1.26
NCP-SP	Gyayak Rajendra Patni	49,932	23.96%	New
AIMIM	Mohammad Yusuf Mohammad Shafi Punjani	31,042	14.90%	New
VBA	Sunil Kesheorao Dhabekar	24,412	11.71%	▲4.96
Samnak Janta Party	Yayati Manoharrao Naik	7,962	3.82%	New
NOTA	None of the above	753	0.36%	▼0.26
Margin of victory		35,073	16.83%	▲4.56
Turnout		209,154	66.08%	▲4.25
Total valid votes		208,401		
Registered electors		316,493		▲4.92
BJP hold		Swing	▲1.26	

=== Assembly Election 2019 ===
2019 Maharashtra Legislative Assembly election : Karanja
Party	Candidate	Votes	%	±%
BJP	Rajendra Sukhanand Patni	73,205	39.53%	▲15.04
NCP	Prakash Uttamrao Dahake	50,481	27.26%	▲15.73
BSP	Mohammad Yusuf Mohammad Shafi Punjani	41,907	22.63%	▲21.19
VBA	Dr. Ram Sheshrao Chavhan	12,493	6.75%	New
MNS	Dr. Subhash Pandurang Rathod	2,160	1.17%	▼15.11
Independent	Digambar Narendra Chavhan	1,816	0.98%	New
NOTA	None of the above	1,142	0.62%	▲0.25
Margin of victory		22,724	12.27%	▲10.00
Turnout		186,523	61.83%	▼1.72
Total valid votes		185,200		
Registered electors		301,654		▲4.48
BJP hold		Swing	▲15.04	

=== Assembly Election 2014 ===
2014 Maharashtra Legislative Assembly election : Karanja
Party	Candidate	Votes	%	±%
BJP	Rajendra Sukhanand Patni	44,751	24.49%	New
BBM	Mohammad Yusuf Mohammad Shafi Punjani	40,604	22.23%	▲7.02
MNS	Ranjit Shersing Jadhav	29,751	16.28%	New
Independent	Prakash Uttamrao Dahake	27,043	14.80%	New
NCP	Subhash Pandhrinath Thakare	21,066	11.53%	▼27.24
SS	Kawar Sudhirkumar Vitthalrao	6,277	3.44%	▼16.54
INC	Jyotitai Anil Ganeshpure	3,010	1.65%	New
BSP	Garve Usman Piru	2,624	1.44%	▲0.17
NOTA	None of the above	668	0.37%	New
Margin of victory		4,147	2.27%	▼16.52
Turnout		183,474	63.55%	▼1.13
Total valid votes		182,695		
Registered electors		288,706		▲15.51
BJP gain from NCP		Swing	▼14.28	

=== Assembly Election 2009 ===
2009 Maharashtra Legislative Assembly election : Karanja
Party	Candidate	Votes	%	±%
NCP	Prakash Uttamrao Dahake	62,658	38.77%	New
SS	Rajendra Sukhanand Patni	32,283	19.98%	▼10.03
Independent	Subhash Pandhrinath Thakare	30,681	18.98%	New
BBM	Dr. Rathod Subhash Pandurang	24,590	15.21%	▼14.77
Independent	Ramesh Pandurang Nakhale	2,191	1.36%	New
Independent	Sawake Ramkrushana Pundlikrao	2,126	1.32%	New
BSP	Mahakal Laxmikant Bhagwantrao	2,049	1.27%	▼9.37
Margin of victory		30,375	18.79%	▲18.75
Turnout		161,651	64.68%	▼2.52
Total valid votes		161,617		
Registered electors		249,933		▲37.34
NCP gain from SS		Swing	▲8.76	

=== Assembly Election 2004 ===
2004 Maharashtra Legislative Assembly election : Karanja
Party	Candidate	Votes	%	±%
SS	Rajendra Sukhanand Patni	36,695	30.01%	▲17.28
BBM	Prakash Uttamrao Dahake	36,648	29.98%	▲23.37
INC	Babasaheb Dhabekar	29,091	23.79%	▼17.74
BSP	Chaware Radhatai Anil	13,009	10.64%	New
Peoples Republican Party	Usman Piru Garwe	4,252	3.48%	New
Independent	Amadabadkar Gajanan Kashinath	2,562	2.10%	New
Margin of victory		47	0.04%	▼3.11
Turnout		122,285	67.20%	▲5.42
Total valid votes		122,257		
Registered electors		181,984		▲15.87
SS gain from INC		Swing	▼11.52	

=== Assembly Election 1999 ===
1999 Maharashtra Legislative Assembly election : Karanja
Party	Candidate	Votes	%	±%
INC	Babasaheb Dhabekar	37,980	41.53%	▲14.50
NCP	Prakash Uttamrao Dahake	35,099	38.38%	New
SS	Bhaurao Hiraji Raut	11,644	12.73%	▲9.01
BBM	Sd. Mohsin Haji Sd. Taleb	6,047	6.61%	New
Margin of victory		2,881	3.15%	▼5.82
Turnout		97,030	61.78%	▼12.85
Total valid votes		91,446		
Registered electors		157,062		▲6.32
INC gain from Independent		Swing	▲5.53	

=== Assembly Election 1995 ===
1995 Maharashtra Legislative Assembly election : Karanja
Party	Candidate	Votes	%	±%
Independent	Babasaheb Dhabekar	39,025	36.00%	New
INC	Prakash Uttamrao Dahake	29,304	27.03%	▼1.92
BBM	Ingale Shrawan Shekoji	20,871	19.25%	New
Independent	Amdabadkar Gajanan Kashinath	5,490	5.06%	New
SS	Ghule Rajendra Madhukarrao	4,031	3.72%	▼37.15
JD	Malani Thakurdas Sukhedoji	3,839	3.54%	New
Independent	Arvind Kamlakar Deshmukh	1,555	1.43%	New
Independent	Usman Piru Garwe	1,149	1.06%	New
Margin of victory		9,721	8.97%	▼2.94
Turnout		110,254	74.63%	▲8.93
Total valid votes		108,414		
Registered electors		147,727		▲11.01
Independent gain from SS		Swing	▼4.87	

=== Assembly Election 1990 ===
1990 Maharashtra Legislative Assembly election : Karanja
Party	Candidate	Votes	%	±%
SS	Gawande Gulabrao Ramrao	35,297	40.87%	New
INC	Babasaheb Dhabekar	25,007	28.95%	▼10.23
BRP	Rode Arjun Bhikuram	15,358	17.78%	New
PWPI	Kankirad Shridhar Shaligram	7,653	8.86%	▼22.13
Margin of victory		10,290	11.91%	▲3.72
Turnout		87,422	65.70%	▲2.45
Total valid votes		86,366		
Registered electors		133,071		▲27.73
SS gain from INC		Swing	▲1.69	

=== Assembly Election 1985 ===
1985 Maharashtra Legislative Assembly election : Karanja
Party	Candidate	Votes	%	±%
INC	Anantrao Vithhalrao Deshmukh	25,376	39.18%	New
PWPI	Bang Manohar Motilalji	20,071	30.99%	▼1.44
Independent	K. P. Meshram	12,786	19.74%	New
Independent	Mubarakkha Tamijkha	1,955	3.02%	New
Independent	Chandumal Pursumal	1,619	2.50%	New
RPI	Tayde Vijaikumar Babanji	1,579	2.44%	▼16.20
Independent	Ismale Haji Jusub	404	0.62%	New
Margin of victory		5,305	8.19%	▼0.96
Turnout		65,895	63.25%	▲8.52
Total valid votes		64,768		
Registered electors		104,182		▲5.40
INC gain from INC(I)		Swing	▼2.40	

=== Assembly Election 1980 ===
1980 Maharashtra Legislative Assembly election : Karanja
Party	Candidate	Votes	%	±%
INC(I)	Rathi Ramkrushna Gangaramji	22,045	41.58%	New
PWPI	Bang Manohar Motilalji	17,193	32.43%	▲12.10
RPI	Ambore Ramdas Narayan	9,880	18.64%	New
JP	Ajit Faruqui Ajimoddin Faruqui	3,208	6.05%	New
Independent	Rachwani Chandumal Parsumal	687	1.30%	New
Margin of victory		4,852	9.15%	▼26.53
Turnout		54,097	54.73%	▼21.80
Total valid votes		53,013		
Registered electors		98,840		▲6.64
INC(I) gain from AIFB		Swing	▼14.42	

=== Assembly Election 1978 ===
1978 Maharashtra Legislative Assembly election : Karanja
Party	Candidate	Votes	%	±%
AIFB	Arvind Kamlakar Deshmukh	38,584	56.00%	New
PWPI	Korpe Wamanrao Ramkrushna Alias Dr. Annasaheb Korpe	14,006	20.33%	New
INC	Tidke Subasrao Bhagwantrao	12,026	17.46%	▼45.25
Independent	Bothara Laxmichand Rupchand	2,686	3.90%	New
Independent	Dhendule Rameshwar Prabhati	924	1.34%	New
Independent	Praghane Abhiman Baliram	604	0.88%	New
Margin of victory		24,578	35.68%	▼10.90
Turnout		70,936	76.53%	▲12.87
Total valid votes		68,894		
Registered electors		92,685		▲126.27
AIFB gain from INC		Swing	▼6.71	

=== Assembly Election 1952 ===
1952 Hyderabad State Legislative Assembly election : Karanja
Party	Candidate	Votes	%	±%
INC	Vithalsinha Jaisinha Thakur	16,351	62.71%	New
Independent	Mahadu Uka Borkar	4,205	16.13%	New
Independent	Birendra Krishnaji Sone	2,597	9.96%	New
SKP	Shalikrao Narayan Kankirad	1,505	5.77%	New
Socialist	Hemchandra Ratansa Vaidya	1,418	5.44%	New
Margin of victory		12,146	46.58%	
Turnout		26,076	63.66%	
Total valid votes		26,076		
Registered electors		40,963		
INC win (new seat)				

== See also ==
- Karanja (disambiguation)
