= Sanjay Rathod =

Indian politician

Sanjay Bhau Rathod
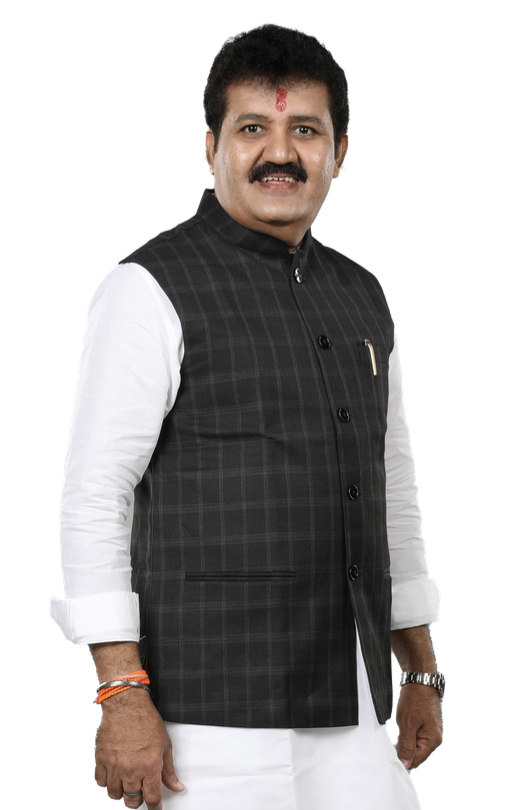

Cabinet Minister Government of Maharashtra
- Incumbent
- Assumed office 15 December 2024
- Minister: Soil and Water Conservation
- Cabinet: Third Fadnavis ministry
- Chief Minister: Devendra Fadnavis
- Deputy CM: Eknath Shinde; Ajit Pawar (till his demise in 2026) Sunetra Pawar (from 2026)
- Guardian Minister: Yavatmal
- Ministry and Departments: Soil and Water Conservation
- Preceded by: Himself

Cabinet Minister in Eknath Shinde ministry Government of Maharashtra
- In office 14 July 2023 – 26 November 2024
- Minister: Soil and Water Conservation
- Preceded by: Eknath Shinde
- Succeeded by: Himself

Cabinet minister in Eknath Shinde ministry Government of Maharashtra
- In office 14 August 2022 – 14 July 2023
- Minister: Food and Drug Administration
- Preceded by: Rajendra Shingne
- Succeeded by: Aatram Dharamraobaba Bhagwantrao

Cabinet Minister Government of Maharashtra
- In office 30 December 2019 – 28 February 2021
- Minister: Forests Department; Disaster Management; Relief & Rehabilitation
- Preceded by: Sudhir Mungantiwar; Chandrashekhar Bawankule
- Succeeded by: Uddhav Balasaheb Thackeray

Minister of State Government of Maharashtra
- In office 5 December 2014 – 30 October 2019
- Minister: Revenue Ministry
- Chief Minister: Devendra Fadnavis
- Preceded by: Prakashdada Solanke
- Succeeded by: Abdul Sattar

Member of the Maharashtra Legislative Assembly
- Incumbent
- Assumed office 2009
- Preceded by: Sanjay Deshmukh
- Constituency: Digras
- In office 2004–2009
- Preceded by: Manikrao Thakre
- Succeeded by: Constituency abolished
- Constituency: Darwha

Guardian Minister of Yavatmal District
- Incumbent
- Assumed office 31 October 2014

Guardian Minister of Yavatmal District
- In office 24 September 2022 – 26 November 2024

Personal details
- Born: Sanjay Dulichand Rathod; 30 June 1971 (age 55) At.Pahur Izara, Tq.Kalamb, Yavatmal District
- Party: Shiv Sena (2022-present) (1995-Incumdent)
- Spouse: Shital Rathod
- Children: Damini Rathod, Soham Rathod
- Education: Arts and Commerce College Yavatmal (B.Com, 1993); Subhedar Ramji Ambedkar Physical Education College, Hinganghat (B.P.Ed., 1995)
- Occupation: Farming and politician

Sanjay Dulichand Rathod is a Shiv Sena politician from Maharashtra. He is a member of the Maharashtra Legislative Assembly from Digras-Darwha Assembly Constituency in Yavatmal district. He is a Shiv Sena leader in Vidarbha and served as a cabinet minister in the UBT government but later joined the Eknath Shinde camp in 2022.

== Career ==
Rathod won from Digras Assembly Constituency representing Shiv Sena in the 2024 Maharashtra Legislative Assembly election. He polled 143,115 votes and defeated his nearest rival, Thakare Manikrao Govindrao of the Indian National Congress by a margin of 28,775 votes.

Sanjay Rathod began his political career at the age of 21 by joining the Shiv Shakti Organisation. He became active in Shiv Sena as a Shiv Sainik since 1995-96. As a result, the Sena was built strongly in the district and in 1998-1999, Balasaheb Thackeray selected him as the Yavatmal district chief of Shiv Sena. He became active in the Darwha-Ner constituency of the then Minister of State for Home Affairs Manikrao Thakre from 2002-2003. He became an MLA for the first time on Shiv Sena ticket winning the 2004 Maharashtra Legislative Assembly election from Darwha Assembly constituency, which ceased to exist from 2008. Later, he was elected from Digras constituency consecutively for four terms in 2009, 2014, 2019 and 2024.

In the 2019 Assembly election, he polled 136,824 votes and defeated his nearest rival, Sanjay Deshmukh, an independent candidate, by a huge margin of 63,607 votes. In 2014, he defeated Vasant Ghuikhedkar of the NCP, by a margin of 79,864 votes. He served as a minister of state in the Ministry of Revenue (Maharashtra). In 2019 he was minister of Forest Department of Maharashtra, Disaster Management & Relief & Rehabilitation. He also served as guardian minister of Yavatmal district twice in 2014 and 2020, and of Washim district in 2015.

He resigned from the cabinet in 2021. In 2022, he was appointed a cabinet minister in the Ministry of Food and Drug Administration (Maharashtra) and in 2023, he served as cabinet minister in the Ministry of Soil and Water Conservation.

== See also ==
- Uddhav Thackeray ministry
- Devendra Fadnavis ministry

Political offices
Preceded by	Minister of State for Revenue, Maharashtra State; 2014–present	Incumbent
Preceded by	Maharashtra State Guardian Minister for Yavatmal district 2014–present	Incumbent
