= Yavatmal Assembly constituency =

Constituency of the Maharashtra legislative assembly in India

Coordinates: 20.38°N 78.12°E

Yavatmal
- Constituency No. 78 for the Maharashtra Legislative Assembly

Constituency details
- Country: India
- Region: Western India
- State: Maharashtra
- District: Yavatmal
- Lok Sabha constituency: Yavatmal-Washim
- Established: 1951
- Total electors: 371,435
- Reservation: None

Member of Legislative Assembly
- 15th Maharashtra Legislative Assembly
- Incumbent Anil alias Balasaheb Shankarrao Mangulkar
- Party: INC
- Alliance: MVA
- Elected year: 2024

Yavatmal Assembly constituency, formerly known as Yeotmal, is one of the 288 constituencies of the Maharashtra Vidhan Sabha and one of the seven which are located in the Yavatmal district in the Indian state of Maharashtra.

It is a part of Yavatmal-Washim Lok Sabha constituency with the adjoining Washim district along with five other Vidhan Sabha assembly constituencies, viz. Washim (SC) and Karanja from Washim district and Ralegaon (ST), Digras and Pusad from Yavatmal district.

The remaining constituencies from Yavatmal district, Wani and Arni are part of Chandrapur Lok Sabha constituency while Umarkhed is part of Nanded Lok Sabha constituency.

== Members of Legislative Assembly ==
Year	Member	Party
1952	Tarachand Shermal Surana	Indian National Congress
1957	Ramchandra Jagoba Kadu alias Babasaheb Gharfalkar	Indian National Congress
1962	Jambuwantrao Dhote	All India Forward Bloc
1964^	Jambuwantrao Dhote	All India Forward Bloc
1967	Jambuwantrao Dhote	All India Forward Bloc
1972	Narsingrao Ramchandra Kadu Gharfalkar	All India Forward Bloc
1978	Jambuwantrao Dhote	Independent
1980	Trambak Deshmukh Parvekar alias Abasaheb Parvekar	Indian National Congress (I)
1980^	Vijayatai Jambhuwantrao Dhote	Indian National Congress (I)
1985	Sadashivrao Thakre	Indian National Congress
1990	Jawahar Deshmukh Parvekar alias Annasaheb Parvekar	Janata Dal
1995	Rajabhau Thakre	Bharatiya Janata Party
1999	Kirti Gandhi	Indian National Congress
2004	Madan Yerawar	Bharatiya Janata Party
2009	Nilesh Deshmukh Parvekar	Indian National Congress
2013^	Nandini Deshmukh Parvekar	Indian National Congress
2014	Madan Yerawar	Bharatiya Janata Party
2019	Madan Yerawar	Bharatiya Janata Party
2024	Balasaheb Mangulkar	Indian National Congress

Madhya Pradesh
Bombay State

== Election results ==
=== Assembly Election 2024 ===
2024 Maharashtra Legislative Assembly election : Yavatmal
Party	Candidate	Votes	%	±%
INC	Balasaheb Mangulkar	117,504	49.32%	▲12.78
BJP	Madan Yerawar	106,123	44.55%	▲6.96
VBA	Dr. Niraj Waghmare	5,432	2.28%	▼1.43
BSP	Bhai Aman	2,425	1.02%	▲0.16
PHJSP	Chaudhary Bipin Anil	2,139	0.90%	▼0.86
NOTA	None of the above	838	0.35%	▼0.48
Margin of victory		11,381	4.78%	▲3.73
Turnout		239,068	64.36%	▲8.32
Total valid votes		238,230		
Registered electors		371,435		▼3.51
INC gain from BJP		Swing	▲11.73	

=== Assembly Election 2019 ===
2019 Maharashtra Legislative Assembly election : Yavatmal
Party	Candidate	Votes	%	±%
BJP	Madan Yerawar	80,425	37.59%	▲11.06
INC	Balasaheb Mangulkar	78,172	36.54%	▲20.15
Independent	Santosh Marotrao Dhawale	38,345	17.92%	New
VBA	Yogesh Shivram Deshmukh Parwekar	7,930	3.71%	New
PHJSP	Bipin Anil Chaudhari	3,757	1.76%	New
BSP	Sandip Anant Devkate	1,848	0.86%	▼16.20
NOTA	None of the above	1,785	0.83%	▲0.47
Vidarbha Rajya Aghadi	Amol Laxmanrao Borkhade, Advocate	1,316	0.62%	New
Margin of victory		2,253	1.05%	▲0.44
Turnout		215,723	56.04%	▼2.43
Total valid votes		213,932		
Registered electors		384,935		▲10.75
BJP hold		Swing	▲11.06	

=== Assembly Election 2014 ===
2014 Maharashtra Legislative Assembly election : Yavatmal
Party	Candidate	Votes	%	±%
BJP	Madan Madhukar Yerawar	53,671	26.53%	▼13.70
SS	Santosh Marotrao Dhavale	52,444	25.93%	New
BSP	Mo. Tarique Mo. Sami	34,498	17.06%	New
INC	Rahul Manikrao Thakare	33,152	16.39%	▼36.80
NCP	Sandeep Rameshchandra Bajoriya	17,909	8.85%	New
MNS	Rajane Bhanudas Bapuraoji	2,373	1.17%	New
Independent	Pradip Marotrao Wadafale	1,708	0.84%	New
NOTA	None of the above	720	0.36%	New
Margin of victory		1,227	0.61%	▼12.35
Turnout		203,202	58.47%	▲21.94
Total valid votes		202,270		
Registered electors		347,558		▲8.03
BJP gain from INC		Swing	▼26.66	

=== Assembly By-election 2013 ===
2013 Maharashtra Legislative Assembly by-election : Yavatmal
Party	Candidate	Votes	%	±%
INC	Nandini Nilesh Deshmukh Parvekar	62,509	53.19%	▲18.50
BJP	Madan Madhukar Yerawar	47,278	40.23%	▲17.77
Independent	H. D. Meshram	3,129	2.66%	New
PRP	U. B. Kamble	1,210	1.03%	New
Independent	Dhale Manish	989	0.84%	New
Margin of victory		15,231	12.96%	▲0.73
Turnout		117,521	36.53%	▼14.87
Total valid votes		117,521		
Registered electors		321,737		▲1.76
INC hold		Swing	▲18.50	

=== Assembly Election 2009 ===
2009 Maharashtra Legislative Assembly election : Yavatmal
Party	Candidate	Votes	%	±%
INC	Nilesh Shivram Deshmukh Parvekar	56,370	34.69%	▲3.55
BJP	Madan Madhukar Yerawar	36,495	22.46%	▼13.30
Independent	Shrikant Alis Balasaheb Madhavrao Chaudhari	26,352	16.22%	New
Independent	Chandrakant Ramraoji Gade Patil	18,650	11.48%	New
BSP	Rajendra Shriramji Mahadole	9,303	5.72%	▼9.22
Independent	Pratima Jagdish Datar	2,532	1.56%	New
CPI	Madhukar Tulshiram Surpatne	2,250	1.38%	New
Independent	Gulhane Nitin Dnyaneshwar	2,089	1.29%	New
Margin of victory		19,875	12.23%	▲7.61
Turnout		162,512	51.40%	▼5.56
Total valid votes		162,508		
Registered electors		316,167		▲30.70
INC gain from BJP		Swing	▼1.07	

=== Assembly Election 2004 ===
2004 Maharashtra Legislative Assembly election : Yavatmal
Party	Candidate	Votes	%	±%
BJP	Madan Madhukar Yerawar	49,234	35.76%	▼0.90
INC	Kirti Gandhi	42,875	31.14%	▼14.76
BSP	Arun Pandharinath Raut	20,574	14.94%	New
Independent	Rajabhau Ganeshrao Thakre	7,951	5.77%	New
Vidarbha Janata Congress	Bhau Jambuwantrao Dhote	7,139	5.18%	New
SP	Arif Raheman A. Rahim	1,911	1.39%	New
BBM	Balu Ramrao Gawande	914	0.66%	New
Margin of victory		6,359	4.62%	▼4.62
Turnout		137,787	56.96%	▼1.71
Total valid votes		137,686		
Registered electors		241,899		▲23.04
BJP gain from INC		Swing	▼10.14	

=== Assembly Election 1999 ===
1999 Maharashtra Legislative Assembly election : Yavatmal
Party	Candidate	Votes	%	±%
INC	Kirti Gandhi	51,343	45.90%	▲24.87
BJP	Madan Madhukar Yerawar	41,011	36.66%	▲5.61
NCP	Ashok Ramchandra Kadu Gharphalkar	18,728	16.74%	New
Margin of victory		10,332	9.24%	▼0.78
Turnout		115,356	58.67%	▲2.10
Total valid votes		111,865		
Registered electors		196,606		▲1.65
INC gain from BJP		Swing	▲14.85	

=== Assembly By-election 1996 ===
1996 Maharashtra Legislative Assembly by-election : Yavatmal
Party	Candidate	Votes	%	±%
BJP	Madan Madhukar Yerawar	33,627	31.05%	▼5.08
INC	Balasaheb Mangulkar	22,776	21.03%	▼2.38
JD	Annasaheb Alias Bhimsing Ramchandrasingh Solanke	14,611	13.49%	▼4.96
Independent	Himmat Pande Patil	13,042	12.04%	New
Independent	Shrikant Alias Balasaheb Chaudhari	8,162	7.54%	New
Independent	Nanabhau Yembadwar	5,305	4.90%	New
Samajwadi Janata Party (Maharashtra)	Anil Anna Gote	4,501	4.16%	New
BSP	Balasaheb Gawande	3,911	3.61%	New
Independent	Asif Khan	1,916	1.77%	New
Margin of victory		10,851	10.02%	▼2.71
Turnout		109,409	56.57%	▼13.26
Total valid votes		108,303		
Registered electors		193,418		▼4.58
BJP hold		Swing	▼5.08	

=== Assembly Election 1995 ===
1995 Maharashtra Legislative Assembly election : Yavatmal
Party	Candidate	Votes	%	±%
BJP	Rajabhau Ganeshrao Thakre	50,384	36.13%	New
INC	Annasaheb Deshmukh Parwekar	32,637	23.41%	▲0.65
JD	Annasaheb Alias Bhimsing Ramchandra Solanke	25,725	18.45%	▼13.40
BBM	Telang Chandan Raghobaji	12,909	9.26%	New
Independent	Dr. Nandurkar Prakash Bhaskarrao	7,713	5.53%	New
AIFB	Bhore Devidas Shamrao	2,591	1.86%	New
Independent	Ingole Sandhya Wasantrao	1,101	0.79%	New
Independent	Gade Holeshwar Tulshiramji	970	0.70%	New
Margin of victory		17,747	12.73%	▲5.75
Turnout		141,536	69.83%	▲10.26
Total valid votes		139,440		
Registered electors		202,695		▲25.62
BJP gain from JD		Swing	▲4.28	

=== Assembly Election 1990 ===
1990 Maharashtra Legislative Assembly election : Yavatmal
Party	Candidate	Votes	%	±%
JD	Jawahar Trimbakrao Deshmukh	30,271	31.85%	New
Independent	Gade Holeshwarrao Tulshiramji	23,632	24.86%	New
INC	Dhote Vijaytai W/o Jambuwantrao	21,633	22.76%	▼41.94
Independent	Balasaheb Alias Shrikant Chaudhary	9,252	9.73%	New
SS	Moharkar Chandrashekhar Madhusudan	5,935	6.24%	New
BSP	Gawande Balu Ramrao	1,057	1.11%	New
Independent	Shantilal Ambadas Jaju	848	0.89%	New
Independent	Chachane Mahadeo Narayanarao	583	0.61%	New
Margin of victory		6,639	6.98%	▼40.74
Turnout		96,121	59.57%	▲11.10
Total valid votes		95,057		
Registered electors		161,350		▲29.97
JD gain from INC		Swing	▼32.85	

=== Assembly Election 1985 ===
1985 Maharashtra Legislative Assembly election : Yavatmal
Party	Candidate	Votes	%	±%
INC	Sadashivrao Bapuji Thakre	38,416	64.70%	New
IC(S)	Balshaheb Ghuikhedkar	10,081	16.98%	New
RPI	Kazi Jalaloddin Razzakmiya	5,246	8.83%	New
AIFB	Bore Devidas Shamraoji	3,330	5.61%	New
Independent	Chachane Mahadeorao Narayanrao	607	1.02%	New
Independent	Thakre Prabhakar Dadaji	599	1.01%	New
Independent	Chhangani Badrinarayan Gopilal	545	0.92%	New
Margin of victory		28,335	47.72%	▼5.49
Turnout		60,179	48.47%	▲2.01
Total valid votes		59,379		
Registered electors		124,148		▲12.69
INC gain from INC(I)		Swing	▼6.62	

=== Assembly Election 1980 ===
1980 Maharashtra Legislative Assembly election : Yavatmal
Party	Candidate	Votes	%	±%
INC(I)	Trambak Dattatrya Deshmukh Alias Abasaheb	35,868	71.32%	New
Independent	Bhore Devidas Shamrao	9,106	18.11%	New
BJP	Sitaram Rangappa Kaushik	3,185	6.33%	New
[[Janata Party (Secular) Charan Singh|Janata Party (Secular) Charan Singh]]	Tiwari Rajkishor Matasaran	563	1.12%	New
Independent	Umashankar Babulal Dixit	530	1.05%	New
Independent	Shantaram Laxmanrao Veti	501	1.00%	New
Independent	Atram Shioram Kacharu	491	0.98%	New
Margin of victory		26,762	53.21%	▲0.20
Turnout		51,191	46.46%	▼28.22
Total valid votes		50,293		
Registered electors		110,172		▲7.32
INC(I) gain from Independent		Swing	▼2.46	

=== Assembly Election 1978 ===
1978 Maharashtra Legislative Assembly election : Yavatmal
Party	Candidate	Votes	%	±%
Independent	Jambhuwantrao Bapurao Dhote	55,608	73.78%	New
JP	Gilani Walimohammed Noormohammed	15,654	20.77%	New
INC	Kapse Vasantrao Kesheorao	2,114	2.80%	▼38.52
Independent	Deshmukh Gulab Ganpat	1,830	2.43%	New
Margin of victory		39,954	53.01%	▲39.01
Turnout		76,663	74.68%	▲4.70
Total valid votes		75,370		
Registered electors		102,658		▲9.24
Independent gain from AIFB		Swing	▲18.46	

=== Assembly Election 1972 ===
1972 Maharashtra Legislative Assembly election : Yavatmal
Party	Candidate	Votes	%	±%
AIFB	Gharfalkar K. N. Ramchandra	35,567	55.32%	New
INC	G. V. Rao Balkrishna	26,564	41.32%	▲9.53
ABJS	Deo Prabhakar Pundlik	1,291	2.01%	▼1.41
Independent	Amjadali Umranali	388	0.60%	New
Margin of victory		9,003	14.00%	▼13.24
Turnout		65,764	69.98%	▼5.15
Total valid votes		64,296		
Registered electors		93,979		▲12.29
AIFB gain from Independent		Swing	▼3.71	

=== Assembly Election 1967 ===
1967 Maharashtra Legislative Assembly election : Yavatmal
Party	Candidate	Votes	%	±%
Independent	Jambhuwantrao Bapurao Dhote	35,374	59.03%	New
INC	A. Mamdani	19,051	31.79%	▼6.77
RPI	P. D. Dable	3,449	5.76%	New
ABJS	P. P. Deo	2,048	3.42%	New
Margin of victory		16,323	27.24%	▲6.77
Turnout		62,878	75.13%	
Total valid votes		59,922		
Registered electors		83,690		
Independent hold		Swing	▲0.00	

=== Assembly By-election 1965 ===
1965 Maharashtra Legislative Assembly by-election : Yavatmal
Party	Candidate	Votes	%	±%
Independent	Jambhuwantrao Bapurao Dhote	25,609	59.03%	New
INC	N. V. Tatad	16,728	38.56%	▼2.85
Independent	B. G. Uike	421	0.97%	New
Independent	M. P. Malunde	386	0.89%	New
Margin of victory		8,881	20.47%	▲18.17
Total valid votes		43,386		
Independent hold		Swing	▲15.32	

=== Assembly Election 1962 ===
1962 Maharashtra Legislative Assembly election : Yavatmal
Party	Candidate	Votes	%	±%
Independent	Jambhuwantrao Bapurao Dhote	19,137	43.71%	New
INC	Chhabutai Uttamrao Dahake	18,128	41.41%	▼24.22
Independent	Baburao Kashinath Yerawar	4,793	10.95%	New
ABJS	Narayan Sadashiv Ranade	1,064	2.43%	New
Independent	Ramnarayan Ramgopal Chamediya	457	1.04%	New
Margin of victory		1,009	2.30%	▼28.95
Turnout		46,542	71.58%	▲7.74
Total valid votes		43,777		
Registered electors		65,021		▲16.55
Independent gain from INC		Swing	▼21.92	

=== Assembly Election 1957 ===
1957 Bombay State Legislative Assembly election : Yeotmal
Party	Candidate	Votes	%	±%
INC	Kadu Ramchandra Jagoba	23,371	65.63%	▲8.66
PSP	Chamedia Ramnarayan Ramgopal	12,241	34.37%	New
Margin of victory		11,130	31.25%	▲1.18
Turnout		35,612	63.84%	▲14.39
Total valid votes		35,612		
Registered electors		55,787		▲2.69
INC hold		Swing	▲8.66	

=== Assembly Election 1952 ===
1952 Hyderabad State Legislative Assembly election : Yeotmal
Party	Candidate	Votes	%	±%
INC	Tarachand Shermal Surana	15,304	56.97%	New
Socialist	Nandkumar Balram Agarwal	7,227	26.91%	New
ABJS	Purushottam Vithal Deshmukh	2,919	10.87%	New
SKP	Rajabhau Bapuji Jamle	1,411	5.25%	New
Margin of victory		8,077	30.07%	
Turnout		26,861	49.45%	
Total valid votes		26,861		
Registered electors		54,325		
INC win (new seat)				

== See also ==
- Yavatmal
