= Digras Assembly constituency =

Constituency of the Maharashtra legislative assembly in India

Coordinates: 20.10°N 77.72°E

Digras
- Constituency No. 79 for the Maharashtra Legislative Assembly

Constituency details
- Country: India
- Region: Western India
- State: Maharashtra
- District: Yavatmal
- Lok Sabha constituency: Yavatmal-Washim
- Established: 1951
- Total electors: 346,058
- Reservation: None

Member of Legislative Assembly
- 15th Maharashtra Legislative Assembly
- Incumbent Sanjay Rathod
- Party: SHS
- Alliance: NDA
- Elected year: 2024

Digras Assembly constituency is one of the 288 constituencies of Maharashtra Vidhan Sabha and one of the seven which are located in the Yavatmal district.

It is a segment of the Yavatmal-Washim (Lok Sabha constituency) with adjoining Washim district along with five other Vidhan Sabha assembly constituencies, viz. Washim (SC), Karanja, Ralegaon (ST), Yavatmal (ST) and Pusad.

== Members of the Legislative Assembly ==
| Year | Member | Party |
|---|---|---|
| 1952 | Alihasan Mamdani | Indian National Congress |
| 1957 | Madhaorao Baburao Mahindre (Patil) | Indian National Congress |
| 1962 | Madhaorao Baburao Mahindre (Patil) | Indian National Congress |
| 1967 | K. D. Mahindre (Patil) | Indian National Congress |
| 1972 | Uttamrao Deorao Patil | Indian National Congress |
| 1978 | Nanabhau Yembadwar | Independent |
| 1980 | Nanabhau Yembadwar | Indian National Congress (I) |
| 1985 | Nanasaheb Tajane | Indian National Congress |
| 1990 | Pratapsing Ade | Indian National Congress |
| 1995 | Shrikant Munginwar | Shiv Sena |
| 1999 | Sanjay Deshmukh | Independent |
| 2004 | Sanjay Deshmukh | Independent |
| 2009 | Sanjay Rathod | Shiv Sena |
| 2014 | Sanjay Rathod | Shiv Sena |
| 2019 | Sanjay Rathod | Shiv Sena |
| 2024 | Sanjay Rathod | Shiv Sena |

Madhya Pradesh
Bombay State

== Election results ==
=== Assembly Election 2024 ===
2024 Maharashtra Legislative Assembly election : Digras
| Party | Candidate | Votes | % | ±% |
|---|---|---|---|---|
| SS | Sanjay Dulichand Rathod | 143,115 | 54.55% | ▼6.34 |
| INC | Manikrao Govindrao Thakre | 114,340 | 43.58% | New |
| VBA | Najukrao Udebhanji Dhande | 1,985 | 0.76% | ▼0.61 |
| NOTA | None of the above | 1,514 | 0.58% | ▲0.10 |
| Margin of victory | | 28,775 | 10.97% | ▼17.34 |
| Turnout | | 263,863 | 76.25% | ▲6.20 |
| Total valid votes | | 262,349 | | |
| Registered electors | | 346,058 | | ▲7.15 |
| SS hold | | Swing | ▼6.34 | |

=== Assembly Election 2019 ===
2019 Maharashtra Legislative Assembly election : Digras
| Party | Candidate | Votes | % | ±% |
|---|---|---|---|---|
| SS | Sanjay Dulichand Rathod | 136,824 | 60.89% | ▲0.44 |
| Independent | Sanjay Uttamrao Deshmukh | 73,217 | 32.59% | New |
| NCP | Tarik Sahir Lokhandwala | 6,205 | 2.76% | ▼17.86 |
| VBA | Adv. Shehjad Samiulla Khan | 3,077 | 1.37% | New |
| Baliraja Party | Devrao Ramnath Masal | 1,811 | 0.81% | New |
| NOTA | None of the above | 1,083 | 0.48% | ▼0.11 |
| Margin of victory | | 63,607 | 28.31% | ▼11.52 |
| Turnout | | 226,259 | 70.05% | ▲1.92 |
| Total valid votes | | 224,693 | | |
| Registered electors | | 322,980 | | ▲9.09 |
| SS hold | | Swing | ▲0.44 | |

=== Assembly Election 2014 ===
2014 Maharashtra Legislative Assembly election : Digras
| Party | Candidate | Votes | % | ±% |
|---|---|---|---|---|
| SS | Sanjay Dulichand Rathod | 121,216 | 60.45% | ▲6.32 |
| NCP | Vasant Vishvasrao Ghuikhedkar | 41,352 | 20.62% | New |
| INC | Devanand Narsing Pawar | 18,807 | 9.38% | ▼16.60 |
| BJP | Ajay Jagatnarayan Dube | 10,902 | 5.44% | New |
| BSP | Vinayak Govindrao Bhoyar | 3,273 | 1.63% | ▼13.61 |
| BMP | Digambar Marotrao Raut | 1,947 | 0.97% | New |
| NOTA | None of the above | 1,185 | 0.59% | New |
| Margin of victory | | 79,864 | 39.83% | ▲11.69 |
| Turnout | | 201,701 | 68.13% | ▼4.15 |
| Total valid votes | | 200,511 | | |
| Registered electors | | 296,059 | | ▲11.11 |
| SS hold | | Swing | ▲6.32 | |

=== Assembly Election 2009 ===
2009 Maharashtra Legislative Assembly election : Digras
| Party | Candidate | Votes | % | ±% |
|---|---|---|---|---|
| SS | Sanjay Dulichand Rathod | 104,134 | 54.13% | ▲27.57 |
| INC | Sanjay Uttamrao Deshmukh | 49,989 | 25.98% | ▲21.29 |
| BSP | Khwaja Baig Mirza | 29,319 | 15.24% | ▲7.90 |
| Independent | Sanjay Sadashiv Rathod | 1,828 | 0.95% | New |
| BBM | Alamkhan Hajimiyakhan Pathan | 1,491 | 0.78% | New |
| MNS | Jadhav Madhav Bhoju | 1,454 | 0.76% | New |
| Independent | Shere Motilal Ramji | 1,275 | 0.66% | New |
| Margin of victory | | 54,145 | 28.14% | ▲26.49 |
| Turnout | | 192,603 | 72.28% | ▼3.26 |
| Total valid votes | | 192,384 | | |
| Registered electors | | 266,460 | | ▲32.08 |
| SS gain from Independent | | Swing | ▲25.91 | |

=== Assembly Election 2004 ===
2004 Maharashtra Legislative Assembly election : Digras
| Party | Candidate | Votes | % | ±% |
|---|---|---|---|---|
| Independent | Sanjay Uttamrao Deshmukh | 42,991 | 28.22% | New |
| SS | Shreekant Alias Balasaheb Munginwar | 40,473 | 26.56% | ▲4.57 |
| NCP | Khwaja Baig Mirza | 30,665 | 20.13% | ▼4.88 |
| BSP | Ade Ratnabai Pratapsing | 11,187 | 7.34% | New |
| Independent | Ade Ramji Bhavsing | 8,986 | 5.90% | New |
| INC | Sau Sumantai Baliram Rathod | 7,152 | 4.69% | New |
| GGP | Ramrao Marotrao Raut Patil | 4,903 | 3.22% | ▼0.01 |
| Independent | Rathod Dulsing Kisan | 2,592 | 1.70% | New |
| Margin of victory | | 2,518 | 1.65% | ▲1.53 |
| Turnout | | 152,397 | 75.54% | ▲9.80 |
| Total valid votes | | 152,360 | | |
| Registered electors | | 201,735 | | ▲15.99 |
| Independent hold | | Swing | ▲3.09 | |

=== Assembly Election 1999 ===
1999 Maharashtra Legislative Assembly election : Digras
| Party | Candidate | Votes | % | ±% |
|---|---|---|---|---|
| Independent | Sanjay Uttamrao Deshmukh | 26,415 | 25.13% | New |
| NCP | Khawaja Mastan Baig | 26,289 | 25.01% | New |
| SS | Shrikant Alias Balubhau Munginwar | 23,110 | 21.99% | ▼11.56 |
| BBM | Sudhakar Jadhav | 16,751 | 15.94% | New |
| JD(S) | Rathod Pratap Lalsingh | 4,964 | 4.72% | New |
| GGP | Bhopidas Chimna Rathod | 3,397 | 3.23% | New |
| Independent | Jadhav Sudhakar Bablaji | 1,708 | 1.63% | New |
| Samajwadi Janata Party (Maharashtra) | Pralhad Bokse Patil | 1,275 | 1.21% | New |
| Margin of victory | | 126 | 0.12% | ▼8.79 |
| Turnout | | 114,340 | 65.74% | ▼7.45 |
| Total valid votes | | 105,100 | | |
| Registered electors | | 173,921 | | ▼3.53 |
| Independent gain from SS | | Swing | ▼8.42 | |

=== Assembly Election 1995 ===
1995 Maharashtra Legislative Assembly election : Digras
| Party | Candidate | Votes | % | ±% |
|---|---|---|---|---|
| SS | Munginwar Shrikant Wamanrao | 43,392 | 33.55% | ▲8.82 |
| JD | Rathod Pratap Lalsing | 31,875 | 24.65% | ▲8.58 |
| INC | Ade Pratapsing Ramsing | 23,574 | 18.23% | ▼28.90 |
| Independent | Bokse Pralhadrao Ramchandra | 4,429 | 3.42% | New |
| BSP | Balasaheb Ramraoji Gawande (Patil) | 4,151 | 3.21% | ▲2.70 |
| Independent | Vijay Alias Vinod Tulsiramji Patil | 3,133 | 2.42% | New |
| BBM | Harising Alias Haribhau Rathod | 2,821 | 2.18% | New |
| Independent | Shinde Vithalrao Rodbaji | 2,708 | 2.09% | New |
| Margin of victory | | 11,517 | 8.91% | ▼13.48 |
| Turnout | | 131,955 | 73.19% | ▲9.87 |
| Total valid votes | | 129,319 | | |
| Registered electors | | 180,288 | | ▲15.14 |
| SS gain from INC | | Swing | ▼13.58 | |

=== Assembly Election 1990 ===
1990 Maharashtra Legislative Assembly election : Digras
| Party | Candidate | Votes | % | ±% |
|---|---|---|---|---|
| INC | Ade Pratapsing Ramsing | 45,964 | 47.13% | ▲3.90 |
| SS | Upganlawar Yeshwant Wasudeo | 24,123 | 24.73% | New |
| JD | Wankhade Chandrakant Vithalrao | 15,675 | 16.07% | New |
| Independent | Rathod Praplasing | 7,342 | 7.53% | New |
| Independent | Patil Vishwarrao Bhaurrao | 1,670 | 1.71% | New |
| Margin of victory | | 21,841 | 22.39% | ▲9.73 |
| Turnout | | 99,155 | 63.32% | ▲1.37 |
| Total valid votes | | 97,534 | | |
| Registered electors | | 156,586 | | ▲23.41 |
| INC hold | | Swing | ▲3.90 | |

=== Assembly Election 1985 ===
1985 Maharashtra Legislative Assembly election : Digras
| Party | Candidate | Votes | % | ±% |
|---|---|---|---|---|
| INC | Tajane Manasaheb Suryabhanji | 33,416 | 43.23% | New |
| IC(S) | Raut Vilasrao Krushanarao | 23,632 | 30.57% | New |
| Independent | Durgadas Kisandas Rathode Alias Maharaj | 13,569 | 17.55% | New |
| Independent | Harichand Bhasu Rathod | 2,911 | 3.77% | New |
| Independent | Baburao Deorao Pawale | 1,308 | 1.69% | New |
| Independent | Mundhe Induwar Narayan | 690 | 0.89% | New |
| Margin of victory | | 9,784 | 12.66% | ▼34.41 |
| Turnout | | 78,607 | 61.95% | ▲3.93 |
| Total valid votes | | 77,302 | | |
| Registered electors | | 126,884 | | ▲11.37 |
| INC gain from INC(I) | | Swing | ▼29.58 | |

=== Assembly Election 1980 ===
1980 Maharashtra Legislative Assembly election : Digras
| Party | Candidate | Votes | % | ±% |
|---|---|---|---|---|
| INC(I) | Embadwar Nanabhau Narayanrao | 47,478 | 72.81% | New |
| INC(U) | Raut Vilas Krishnarao | 16,789 | 25.75% | New |
| Independent | Buchake Govindrao Punjaji | 937 | 1.44% | New |
| Margin of victory | | 30,689 | 47.07% | ▲6.80 |
| Turnout | | 66,096 | 58.02% | ▼20.44 |
| Total valid votes | | 65,204 | | |
| Registered electors | | 113,926 | | ▲6.15 |
| INC(I) gain from Independent | | Swing | ▲13.33 | |

=== Assembly Election 1978 ===
1978 Maharashtra Legislative Assembly election : Digras
| Party | Candidate | Votes | % | ±% |
|---|---|---|---|---|
| Independent | Embadwar Nanabhau Narayanrao | 49,051 | 59.48% | New |
| INC | Shivajirao Moghe | 15,846 | 19.22% | ▼27.13 |
| JP | Ade Pratapsing Ramsing | 13,664 | 16.57% | New |
| Independent | Solanke Marotrao Timaji | 1,221 | 1.48% | New |
| Independent | Padmawar Rambhau Ramkrushna | 679 | 0.82% | New |
| PWPI | Jamanakar Haribhau Keshaorao | 636 | 0.77% | New |
| Independent | Pande Shriram Gunaji | 580 | 0.70% | New |
| Margin of victory | | 33,205 | 40.27% | ▲35.49 |
| Turnout | | 84,205 | 78.46% | ▲5.63 |
| Total valid votes | | 82,464 | | |
| Registered electors | | 107,321 | | ▲4.34 |
| Independent gain from INC | | Swing | ▲13.13 | |

=== Assembly Election 1972 ===
1972 Maharashtra Legislative Assembly election : Digras
| Party | Candidate | Votes | % | ±% |
|---|---|---|---|---|
| INC | Uttamrao Deorao Patil | 33,753 | 46.35% | ▲4.06 |
| AIFB | Nanabhau Narayanrao Embadwar Patil | 30,269 | 41.56% | New |
| Independent | Gawande Bhimrao Deorao | 2,103 | 2.89% | New |
| RPI | Sirsat Sahebrao Kisanrao | 2,033 | 2.79% | New |
| CPI | Ch Shioram Dattatraya | 1,347 | 1.85% | New |
| ABJS | Chiddarwar V. Pandharinath | 1,305 | 1.79% | ▲0.03 |
| Independent | Turabkha Rustamkha | 768 | 1.05% | New |
| INC(O) | Deshmukh Ashok Amrutrao | 587 | 0.81% | New |
| Margin of victory | | 3,484 | 4.78% | ▼2.88 |
| Turnout | | 74,913 | 72.83% | ▼2.41 |
| Total valid votes | | 72,825 | | |
| Registered electors | | 102,857 | | ▲15.50 |
| INC hold | | Swing | ▲4.06 | |

=== Assembly Election 1967 ===
1967 Maharashtra Legislative Assembly election : Digras
| Party | Candidate | Votes | % | ±% |
|---|---|---|---|---|
| INC | K. D. Mahindre | 26,164 | 42.29% | ▼3.74 |
| PWPI | H. K. Jamankar | 21,425 | 34.63% | ▼7.68 |
| Independent | S. G. Pande | 9,063 | 14.65% | New |
| Independent | K. B. Todasam | 3,728 | 6.03% | New |
| ABJS | N. N. Chavan | 1,091 | 1.76% | New |
| Independent | S. K. Babar | 399 | 0.64% | New |
| Margin of victory | | 4,739 | 7.66% | ▲3.94 |
| Turnout | | 67,003 | 75.24% | ▼3.56 |
| Total valid votes | | 61,870 | | |
| Registered electors | | 89,052 | | ▲21.95 |
| INC hold | | Swing | ▼3.74 | |

=== Assembly Election 1962 ===
1962 Maharashtra Legislative Assembly election : Digras
| Party | Candidate | Votes | % | ±% |
|---|---|---|---|---|
| INC | Madhaorao Baburao Mahindre | 24,660 | 46.03% | ▼11.05 |
| PWPI | Govindrao Punjaji Buchake | 22,668 | 42.31% | New |
| Independent | Ziauddin Syed Ishgaque Syed | 5,084 | 9.49% | New |
| ABJS | Namdeo Narayan Chavan | 1,162 | 2.17% | New |
| Margin of victory | | 1,992 | 3.72% | ▼10.44 |
| Turnout | | 57,541 | 78.80% | ▲14.17 |
| Total valid votes | | 53,574 | | |
| Registered electors | | 73,021 | | ▲21.08 |
| INC hold | | Swing | ▼11.05 | |

=== Assembly Election 1957 ===
1957 Bombay State Legislative Assembly election : Digras
| Party | Candidate | Votes | % | ±% |
|---|---|---|---|---|
| INC | Madhaorao Baburao Mahindre | 22,248 | 57.08% | ▲9.15 |
| Independent | Buchake Govindrao Punjaji | 16,728 | 42.92% | New |
| Margin of victory | | 5,520 | 14.16% | ▼5.27 |
| Turnout | | 38,976 | 64.63% | ▲11.87 |
| Total valid votes | | 38,976 | | |
| Registered electors | | 60,308 | | ▲18.39 |
| INC hold | | Swing | ▲9.15 | |

=== Assembly Election 1952 ===
1952 Hyderabad State Legislative Assembly election : Digras
| Party | Candidate | Votes | % | ±% |
|---|---|---|---|---|
| INC | Alihasan Jiwabhai Mamdani | 12,883 | 47.93% | New |
| SKP | Govind Punjaji Buchake | 7,660 | 28.50% | New |
| Independent | Gulabrao Dattaram Patil | 3,924 | 14.60% | New |
| Socialist | Nana Dada Solke | 2,410 | 8.97% | New |
| Margin of victory | | 5,223 | 19.43% | |
| Turnout | | 26,877 | 52.76% | |
| Total valid votes | | 26,877 | | |
| Registered electors | | 50,941 | | |
| INC win (new seat) | | | | |

== See also ==
- Digras
- Darwha
- Ner Parsopant
