= Prakash Dahake =

Indian politician

Prakash Dahake Patil

Member of the Maharashtra Legislative Assembly
- In office (2009–2014)
- Preceded by: Rajendra Patni
- Succeeded by: Rajendra Patni
- Constituency: Karanja Assembly constituency

Personal details
- Born: Karanja, Washim District
- Died: 10 May 2021 (aged 68) Nagpur, Maharashtra
- Party: Nationalist Congress Party (1999-2021)
- Other party: Indian National Congress (Till 1999); Bharipa Bahujan Mahasangha (2004)
- Spouse: Sai Prakash Dahake
- Relations: Dilip Walse Patil (Brother-in-Law)

Prakash Uttamrao Dahake Patil was an Indian politician. He is a member of the Maharashtra Legislative Assembly representing Karanja Assembly constituency representing the Nationalist Congress Party and He held the post of Chairman of the Karanja Agricultural Produce Market Committee for 15 consecutive years and During 2009, he was also elected as the Chairman of the Vidarbha Development Corporation till 2014.

== Political career ==
Prakash Dahake had a distinct identity as 'Dada' in politics and by his supporters. He won the 2009 Maharashtra Legislative Assembly election representing the Nationalist Congress Party from Karanja Assembly constituency but His supporters always win from beginning in large numbers in the elections of Gram Panchayat, Panchayat Samiti, Zilla Parishad, Purchase and Sale Union and Service Cooperative Society in rural areas. Prakash Dad was known in the taluka as Prakash Parv in the social and political arena and He held the post of Chairman of the Karanja Agricultural Produce Market Committee for 15 consecutive years and During 2009, he was also elected as the Chairman of the Vidarbha Development Corporation till 2014.

Later, he lost twice to the same candidate in the 2014 & 2019 Assembly elections. However, his wife joined the Bharatiya Janata Party and won the 2024 Maharashtra Legislative Assembly election, by defeating Rajendra Patni Son, Gyayak Rajendra Patni who contested on the Nationalist Congress Party (SP) ticket.
