= Sai Prakash Dahake =

Indian politician

Member of the Maharashtra Legislative Assembly
- Incumbent
- Assumed office 20 November 2024
- Preceded by: Rajendra Patni
- Constituency: Karanja Assembly constituency

Personal details
- Born: 1964 (age 61–62)
- Party: Bharatiya Janata Party (2024-Present)
- Other political affiliations: Nationalist Congress Party (Till 2024)
- Spouse: Prakash Uttamrao Dahake (died)

Sai Prakash Dahake Patil (born 1964) is an Indian politician from Maharashtra. She is an MLA from Karanja Assembly constituency in Washim district. She won the 2024 Maharashtra Legislative Assembly election representing the Bharatiya Janata Party.

== Early life and education ==
Dahake is from Karanja, Washim district, Maharashtra. She was wife of late Prakash Uttamrao Dahake, the former MLA from Karanja seat. She studied Class 12 at Ladies High School, Amravati, and passed in 1982. Later, she discontinued her studies.

== Career ==
Dahake won from Karanja Assembly constituency representing Bharatiya Janata Party in the 2024 Maharashtra Legislative Assembly election. She polled 85,005 votes and defeated her nearest rival and sitting MLA son Gyayak Rajendra Patni of the Nationalist Congress Party (SP), by a margin of 35,073 votes.
