= Manikrao Thakare =

Indian politician

AICC Incharge of Goa, Daman and Diu and Dadra and Nagar Haveli
- Incumbent
- Assumed office 24 December 2023

Member of Maharashtra Legislative Assembly
- In office (1985-1990), (1990-1995), (1995-1999), (1999 – 2004)
- Preceded by: Mandhana Harish Rameshwar
- Succeeded by: Sanjay Dulichand Rathod
- Constituency: Darwha

Member of Maharashtra Legislative Council
- In office (2009-2012), (2012 – 2018)
- Preceded by: Govindrao Adik
- Succeeded by: Ram Patil Ratolikar

President of Maharashtra Pradesh Congress Committee
- In office (2008–2015)
- Preceded by: Patangrao Kadam
- Succeeded by: Ashok Chavan

Minister of State in Fourth Pawar ministry
- In office 6 March 1993 – 14 March 1995
- Minister: Home ministry, Agriculture, Rural Development ,Parliamentary Affairs, Jail Ministry

Minister of State in First Deshmukh ministry
- In office 18 Oct 1999 – 16 Jan 2003
- Minister: Home Affairs (Rural), Employment guarantee, Parliamentary affairs

Minister of State in Sushilkumar Shinde ministry
- In office 18 Jan 2003 – 6 July 2004
- Minister: Ministry of Energy, New and Renewable Energy Maharashtra

Deputy Chairman of Maharashtra Legislative Council
- In office 5 Aug 2016 – 19 July 2018
- Succeeded by: Neelam Gorhe

AICC Incharge for Telangana Pradesh Congress Committee
- In office 5 Jan 2023 – 24 December 2023
- Preceded by: Manickam Tagore
- Succeeded by: Deepa Dasmunsi

Guardian Minister of Nanded district
- In office (1993-1995), (18 Oct 1999 – 16 Jan 2003)

Maharashtra Youth Congress President
- In office (1988–1995)

Guardian Minister of Wardha
- In office 2003–2004

Personal details
- Born: 22 August 1954 (age 72) Haru, Darwha Taluka, Yavatmal district, Maharashtra
- Party: Indian National Congress
- Children: Rahul Manikrao Thakare, Atul Thakare
- Education: 12th Pass Under BA 2nd (Available Certificate) & 10th From Dinbai Vidyalaya, Digras Tq. Digras Dist. Yavatmal (Year 1970-71)
- Occupation: Pension, Rental Income & Agriculture

Manikrao Govindrao Thakare (born 22 August 1954) is an Indian politician from the state of Maharashtra. He is a senior leader of Indian National Congress. He was previously a member of the Maharashtra Legislative Assembly from the Indian National Congress from 1985 until 2004 from Darwha (Vidhan Sabha constituency) Constituency.

He was given the Energy Ministry portfolio during January 2003 - 2004 and in July 2004, he was one of 22 ministers to be dropped as minister by the then Chief Minister of Maharashtra Sushilkumar Shinde.

Manikrao has been a vocal critic of the Bharatiya Janata Party - Shiv Sena alliance government which ruled Maharashtra up to 1999, especially its handling of the Srikrishna Commission. On 27 July 1998, Manikrao along with R R Patil demanded that the Justice Shrikrishna Commission report be tabled on the floor of the assembly. This forced an adjournment of the assembly. His relentless criticism of the then government in the legislature ensured that when the government lost its mandate.

Manikrao Thakare was appointed AICC incharge of Telangana affairs on 4 January 2023.
