= Pusad Assembly constituency =

Constituency of the Maharashtra legislative assembly in India

Coordinates: 19.91°N 77.56°E

Pusad
- Constituency No. 81 for the Maharashtra Legislative Assembly

Constituency details
- Country: India
- Region: Western India
- State: Maharashtra
- District: Yavatmal
- Lok Sabha constituency: Yavatmal-Washim
- Established: 1951
- Total electors: 322,054
- Reservation: None

Member of Legislative Assembly
- 15th Maharashtra Legislative Assembly
- Incumbent Indranil Naik
- Party: NCP
- Alliance: NDA
- Elected year: 2024

Pusad Assembly constituency, formerly known as Fusad , is one of the 288 constituencies of the Maharashtra Vidhan Sabha and one of the seven which are located in Yavatmal district. This Constituency Is dominated by the Naik Family since the formation of the State of Maharashtra.

It is a part of Yavatmal-Washim Lok Sabha constituency with adjoining Washim district along with five other Vidhan Sabha assembly constituencies, viz. Washim (SC), Karanja, Ralegaon (ST), Yavatmal and Digras.

== Members of the Legislative Assembly ==
Year	Member	Party
1952	Vasantrao Phulsingh Naik; Daulat Laxman Khadse	Indian National Congress
1957	Vasantrao Phulsingh Naik; Daulat Laxman Khadse (Sc)	Indian National Congress
1962	Vasantrao Phulsingh Naik	Indian National Congress
1967	Vasantrao Phulsingh Naik	Indian National Congress
1972	Vasantrao Phulsingh Naik	Indian National Congress
1978	Sudhakarrao Rajusing Naik	Indian National Congress
1980	Sudhakarrao Rajusing Naik	Indian National Congress (I)
1985	Sudhakarrao Rajusing Naik	Indian National Congress
1990	Sudhakarrao Rajusing Naik	Indian National Congress
1995	Manohar Rajusing Naik	Indian National Congress
1999	Sudhakarrao Rajusing Naik	Nationalist Congress Party
2001 By-election	Manohar Rajusing Naik	Nationalist Congress Party
2004	Manohar Rajusing Naik	Nationalist Congress Party
2009	Manohar Rajusing Naik	Nationalist Congress Party
2014	Manohar Rajusing Naik	Nationalist Congress Party
2019	Indranil Manohar Naik	Nationalist Congress Party
2024	Indranil Manohar Naik	Nationalist Congress Party

Madhya Pradesh
Bombay State

== Election results ==
=== Assembly Election 2024 ===
2024 Maharashtra Legislative Assembly election : Pusad
Party	Candidate	Votes	%	±%
NCP	Indranil Manohar Naik	127,964	60.22%	New
NCP-SP	Sharad Apparao Maind	37,195	17.51%	New
VBA	Madhav Rukhmaji Vaidya	36,575	17.21%	▲11.22
Independent	Madhukar Raju Rathod	2,545	1.20%	New
Independent	Vishal Baliram Jadhao	1,942	0.91%	New
MNS	Ashwin Rameshlalji Jaiswal	1,614	0.76%	▲0.07
NOTA	None of the above	1,348	0.63%	▼0.14
Margin of victory		90,769	42.72%	▲37.56
Turnout		213,828	66.40%	▲1.52
Total valid votes		212,480		
Registered electors		322,054		▲9.68
Nationalist Congress Party (post–2023) gain from NCP		Swing	▲12.81	

=== Assembly Election 2019 ===
2019 Maharashtra Legislative Assembly election : Pusad
Party	Candidate	Votes	%	±%
NCP	Indranil Manohar Naik	89,143	47.41%	▼7.35
BJP	Nilay Madhukar Naik	79,442	42.25%	▲31.11
VBA	Dnyaneshwar (Nana) Dadarao Bele	11,255	5.99%	New
Bahujan Maha Party	Shaligram Tukaram Tambare	2,153	1.15%	New
NOTA	None of the above	1,445	0.77%	▲0.12
BSP	Adv. Savitatai Adhao	1,431	0.76%	▼1.49
MNS	Abhay Madhukar Gadam	1,302	0.69%	New
Margin of victory		9,701	5.16%	▼32.85
Turnout		190,513	64.88%	▲3.43
Total valid votes		188,011		
Registered electors		293,635		▲4.27
NCP hold		Swing	▼7.35	

=== Assembly Election 2014 ===
2014 Maharashtra Legislative Assembly election : Pusad
Party	Candidate	Votes	%	±%
NCP	Manohar Rajusing Naik	94,152	54.76%	▲3.91
SS	Prakash Abaji Deosarkar Patil	28,793	16.75%	▼13.77
BJP	Vasantrao Deorao Patil (Kanhekar)	19,155	11.14%	New
INC	Sachin Vishwasrao Naik	15,017	8.73%	New
Independent	Vishalbhau Baliram Jadhav	5,535	3.22%	New
BSP	Shilanand Laxmanrao Kamble	3,866	2.25%	▲0.45
BMP	Gavhale Ganpat Limbaji	1,252	0.73%	New
Independent	Shaikh Jabbar Shaikh Usuf	1,217	0.71%	New
NOTA	None of the above	1,111	0.65%	New
Margin of victory		65,359	38.01%	▲17.68
Turnout		173,057	61.45%	▼1.69
Total valid votes		171,944		
Registered electors		281,610		▲17.21
NCP hold		Swing	▲3.91	

=== Assembly Election 2009 ===
2009 Maharashtra Legislative Assembly election : Pusad
Party	Candidate	Votes	%	±%
NCP	Manohar Rajusing Naik	77,136	50.85%	▼6.91
SS	Dr. Aarti Haribhau Phupate	46,296	30.52%	▼1.42
Independent	Nilay Madhukar Naik	18,486	12.19%	New
BSP	Dhananjay Govindrao Kamble	2,732	1.80%	▼2.91
Independent	Hadse Sambhaji Limbaji	1,592	1.05%	New
Independent	Punjab Tulshiram Jadhav	1,501	0.99%	New
Prabuddha Republican Party	Uttam Bhagaji Kamble	1,465	0.97%	New
Margin of victory		30,840	20.33%	▼5.50
Turnout		151,707	63.14%	▼7.87
Total valid votes		151,687		
Registered electors		240,260		▲6.36
NCP hold		Swing	▼6.91	

=== Assembly Election 2004 ===
2004 Maharashtra Legislative Assembly election : Pusad
Party	Candidate	Votes	%	±%
NCP	Manohar Rajusing Naik	92,647	57.76%	▲0.15
SS	Dr. Aarti Haribhau Phupate	51,226	31.94%	▲11.80
BSP	Arunbhau Sakharamji Kinwatkar	7,549	4.71%	New
Independent	Sy. Wahidouddin Sy. Karimoddin	2,940	1.83%	New
Independent	Sk. Amin Sk. Chattu	1,585	0.99%	New
ABS	Vijay Keshaorao Babar	1,507	0.94%	New
Independent	Shiwshankar Marotrao Wanjare	1,015	0.63%	New
Margin of victory		41,421	25.83%	▼11.65
Turnout		160,405	71.01%	▼2.02
Total valid votes		160,389		
Registered electors		225,900		▲22.56
NCP hold		Swing	▲0.15	

=== Assembly By-election 2001 ===
2001 Maharashtra Legislative Assembly by-election : Pusad
Party	Candidate	Votes	%	±%
NCP	Manohar Rajusing Naik	77,549	57.61%	▲10.52
SS	Rajan Shivajirao Mukhare	27,105	20.14%	▼14.69
Independent	Vijayrao Deorao Patil (Chondhikar)	13,261	9.85%	New
BBM	Madhao Parshuram Sarkunde	12,696	9.43%	New
Independent	Rathod Shankar Vasaram	2,537	1.88%	New
Independent	Uttam Bhagaji Kamble	1,455	1.08%	New
Margin of victory		50,444	37.48%	▲25.22
Turnout		134,603	73.03%	▼1.73
Total valid votes		134,603		
Registered electors		184,311		▲4.48
NCP hold		Swing	▲10.52	

=== Assembly Election 1999 ===
1999 Maharashtra Legislative Assembly election : Pusad
Party	Candidate	Votes	%	±%
NCP	Sudhakarrao Rajusing Naik	60,177	47.09%	New
SS	Rajan Shivajirao Mukhare	44,507	34.83%	▲33.31
INC	Vijayrao Bhopasingh Naik (Chavhan)	21,488	16.82%	▼29.75
Margin of victory		15,670	12.26%	▲10.71
Turnout		131,880	74.76%	▼2.72
Total valid votes		127,790		
Registered electors		176,406		▼2.39
NCP gain from INC		Swing	▲0.52	

=== Assembly Election 1995 ===
1995 Maharashtra Legislative Assembly election : Pusad
Party	Candidate	Votes	%	±%
INC	Manohar Rajusing Naik	63,732	46.57%	▼7.44
JD	Narendra Godhajirao Mukhare	61,614	45.02%	▲14.00
SS	Keshaorao Laxman Pulate	2,080	1.52%	▼10.28
Doordarshi Party	Chaudhari Dnyandeo Vedu	1,690	1.23%	▲0.90
Independent	Babusing Shioram Pawar	1,195	0.87%	New
Margin of victory		2,118	1.55%	▼21.45
Turnout		140,030	77.48%	▲6.49
Total valid votes		136,857		
Registered electors		180,728		▲15.00
INC hold		Swing	▼7.44	

=== Assembly Election 1990 ===
1990 Maharashtra Legislative Assembly election : Pusad
Party	Candidate	Votes	%	±%
INC	Sudhakarrao Rajusing Naik	59,364	54.01%	▼5.95
JD	Shriram sonba Ambhore	34,088	31.02%	New
SS	Raju Ramu Naik	12,970	11.80%	New
INS(SCS)	Sarjerao Ganpatrao Kakade	1,411	1.28%	New
Independent	Tanmane Anil Rangrao	716	0.65%	New
Margin of victory		25,276	23.00%	▼14.89
Turnout		111,561	70.99%	▼3.17
Total valid votes		109,906		
Registered electors		157,156		▲23.85
INC hold		Swing	▼5.95	

=== Assembly Election 1985 ===
1985 Maharashtra Legislative Assembly election : Pusad
Party	Candidate	Votes	%	±%
INC	Sudhakarrao Rajusing Naik	55,314	59.96%	New
IC(S)	Gulabrao Jayawantrao Deshmukh	20,358	22.07%	New
Independent	Abdul Rauf Sk Mohinoddin	13,350	14.47%	New
Independent	Chandrashekhar Abhimanyu Bahekar	802	0.87%	New
Margin of victory		34,956	37.89%	▲15.32
Turnout		94,101	74.16%	▲1.37
Total valid votes		92,256		
Registered electors		126,888		▲15.04
INC gain from INC(I)		Swing	▼1.33	

=== Assembly Election 1980 ===
1980 Maharashtra Legislative Assembly election : Pusad
Party	Candidate	Votes	%	±%
INC(I)	Sudhakarrao Rajusing Naik	48,368	61.29%	New
INC(U)	Shamrao Rajhunath Todase	30,553	38.71%	New
Margin of victory		17,815	22.57%	▲8.44
Turnout		80,288	72.79%	▼8.32
Total valid votes		78,921		
Registered electors		110,296		▲7.43
INC(I) gain from INC		Swing	▲8.00	

=== Assembly Election 1978 ===
1978 Maharashtra Legislative Assembly election : Pusad
Party	Candidate	Votes	%	±%
INC	Sudhakarrao Rajusing Naik	43,485	53.29%	▼14.75
JP	Vasantrao Deorao Paul	31,958	39.16%	New
Independent	Baban Agam Sangawar	2,185	2.68%	New
Independent	Eknath Shankar Bhise	1,493	1.83%	New
Margin of victory		11,527	14.13%	▼24.24
Turnout		83,275	81.11%	▼1.56
Total valid votes		81,606		
Registered electors		102,672		▲11.43
INC hold		Swing	▼14.75	

=== Assembly Election 1972 ===
1972 Maharashtra Legislative Assembly election : Pusad
Party	Candidate	Votes	%	±%
INC	Vasantrao Phulsingh Naik	50,772	68.04%	▼1.77
AIFB	Jambuwantrao Dhote	22,140	29.67%	New
RPI	Sirsat Sahebrao Kisanrao	1,343	1.80%	New
Margin of victory		28,632	38.37%	▼6.01
Turnout		76,176	82.67%	▲0.87
Total valid votes		74,626		
Registered electors		92,143		▲16.53
INC hold		Swing	▼1.77	

=== Assembly Election 1967 ===
1967 Maharashtra Legislative Assembly election : Pusad
Party	Candidate	Votes	%	±%
INC	Vasantrao Phulsingh Naik	42,089	69.81%	▲8.15
Independent	R. Monagthane	15,335	25.44%	New
ABJS	N. S. Dravid	1,613	2.68%	New
CPI	D. L. Bali	1,250	2.07%	New
Margin of victory		26,754	44.38%	▲15.10
Turnout		64,678	81.80%	▼5.38
Total valid votes		60,287		
Registered electors		79,070		▲11.01
INC hold		Swing	▲8.15	

=== Assembly Election 1962 ===
1962 Maharashtra Legislative Assembly election : Pusad
Party	Candidate	Votes	%	±%
INC	Vasantrao Phulsingh Naik	36,946	61.66%	▼0.12
Independent	Nalinibai Godhajirao Mukhare	19,402	32.38%	New
RPI	Babarao Raoji Lokhande	2,287	3.82%	New
Independent	Paikrao Kisan Punjaji	1,282	2.14%	New
Margin of victory		17,544	29.28%	▲17.64
Turnout		62,092	87.18%	▼45.32
Total valid votes		59,917		
Registered electors		71,225		▼37.85
INC hold		Swing	▲29.02	

=== Assembly Election 1957 ===
1957 Bombay State Legislative Assembly election : Pusad
Party	Candidate	Votes	%	±%
INC	Vasantrao Phulsingh Naik	49,569	32.64%	▼18.73
INC	Daulat Laxman Khadse	44,244	29.14%	▼22.23
CPI	Dattarao Marotrao Deshmukh	31,897	21.01%	New
SCF	Sukatnak Vishwasrao	26,136	17.21%	▲3.46
Margin of victory		17,672	11.64%	▲9.42
Turnout		151,846	132.50%	▲20.79
Total valid votes		151,846		
Registered electors		114,597		▲8.87
INC hold		Swing	▲5.85	

=== Assembly Election 1952 ===
1952 Hyderabad State Legislative Assembly election : Fusad
Party	Candidate	Votes	%	±%
INC	Vasantrao Phulsingh Naik	31,507	26.79%	New
INC	Daulat Laxman Khadse	28,902	24.58%	New
Socialist	Satwarao Bajirao Naik	19,968	16.98%	New
Independent	Dattarao Marotrao Deshmukh	18,409	15.65%	New
SCF	Sahebrao Kisanrao Sirsat	16,171	13.75%	New
Independent	Vithal Deshrath Makesar	2,637	2.24%	New
Margin of victory		2,605	2.22%	
Turnout		117,594	111.71%	
Total valid votes		117,594		
Registered electors		105,263		
INC win (new seat)				

== See also ==
- Pusad
