= Vidarbha movement =

Movement for proposed separate Kosal state in India

Map of India with Vidarbha highlighted in red

The Vidarbha movement includes political activities organised by various individuals, organizations and political parties, for creation of a separate state of Vidarbha, within the republic of India, with Nagpur as the capital. The proposed state corresponds to the eastern 11 districts of the state of Maharashtra. It makes up for 31% of area and 21% of population of the present state of Maharashtra. The area is covered by thick tropical forests and is surplus in electricity, minerals, rice and cotton.

== Statehood demand ==
The Vidarbha region is a centrally located area in India and forms eastern part of Maharashtra state. The earliest demand for a separate state of Vidarbha was raised over 100 years ago, prior to the concept of "Samyukta Maharashtra". As a result of which, the Central Provinces legislature passed a unanimous resolution to create a separate state of 'Maha Vidarbha' on 1 October 1938 at Nagpur. Some people celebrate 1 October as 'Vidarbha Day'. Vidarbha State formation does not occur due to West Maharashtra (Mumbai and Pune) political party Rule.

After merging with the state of Maharashtra, there was a repeated demand for separate statehood, driven by economic considerations and citing the growing developmental backlog.

== State Reorganization Commission ==
The Government of India appointed the first States Reorganisation Commission (SRC) under Chairmanship of Fazl Ali on 29 December 1953.

Vidarbhite leaders at that time, like Madhav Shrihari Aney and Brajlal Biyani, submitted a memorandum to State Reorganisation Commission (SRC) for a separate Vidarbha State.

B. R. Ambedkar supported the "One state - One language" principle for the reorganization of states and opposed the "one language - one state" policy. As a result, he advocated for the formation of at least 2 separate states for Marathi-speaking people instead of a single large state of Maharashtra. He believed that one state should have one language, but also acknowledged the possibility of having two or more separate states with the same language based on the need for efficient administration. He specifically favored the creation of a "Vidarbha State" with Nagpur as its capital, arguing that a single government could not effectively administer such a large state as United Maharashtra.

The Fazal Ali SRC, after considering these memoranda and all other related aspects, favoured a separate Vidarbha State with Nagpur as capital in the year 1956.

But Vidarbha was made part of the new state of Maharashtra in 1960 by the central government, favouring the "One language - One state" principle.

== Nagpur Pact ==
The 1953 Nagpur Pact assures equitable development of all the regions of the proposed Marathi State. Most prominent clause of the Nagpur Pact was: one session of Maharashtra state assembly in Nagpur city every year, with minimum six weeks duration, to discuss issues exclusively related to Vidarbha.

The signatories to the pact in 1953 were:

- Yashwantrao Chavan, then Minister in Morarji Desai ministry of Bombay State
- Ramrao Krishnarao Patil, Gandhian, Ex ICS Officer and member of first Planning Commission (India).

Few notable politicians and others, who rejected to sign this 1953 pact were:

- Dhananjay Ramchandra Gadgil, Nagpur
- D. V. Gokhale, Wardha
- Narayanrao Deshmukh Shirala Amravati
- JagannathRao Deshmukh Nerpingalai Amravati

== Merger with Maharashtra ==
On 1 May 1960, the Vidarbha state was merged with a newly formed Maharashtra State, under the agreement known as Nagpur Pact.

== Post merger developments ==
Following the merger, the winter assembly session convenes routinely in Nagpur. Notably, the session does not span the full six weeks as stipulated in the "Nagpur Pact". Furthermore, despite its intended focus on Vidarbha-related matters, the session operates akin to a standard Maharashtra state assembly session by addressing a wide array of issues. Allegations of insufficient development in the Vidarbha region within the context of the unified Maharashtra state have sparked renewed appeals for more balanced development across all regions of the state.

Under these circumstances, the Maharashtra Government appointed a committee, to study regional imbalances in Maharashtra. The committee found that:

"The failure to report to the state assembly every year in terms of the Nagpur Pact, has been a serious lapse on the part of the state Government. If a report had been made to state legislature, as per the Nagpur Agreement, the matter would have received sustained attention. In the circumstances this did not happen."

== Political groups associated with the movement ==
A staunch Vidarbhite Madhav Shrihari Aney won the Nagpur Lok Sabha constituency in 1962, on separate Vidarbha state agenda as an independent candidate.

Raje Vishveshvar Rao won Chandrapur Lok Sabha constituency in 1977, on separate Vidarbha agenda.

Jambuwantrao Dhote won, Nagpur Lok Sabha constituency in 1971, as a All India Forward Bloc candidate, with a clear separate Vidarbha state agenda. Vidarbha Janata Congress was founded by Jambuwantrao Dhote, on 9 September 2002 for the separate Vidarbha state.

Former central cabinet ministers of Indian National Congress, Vasant Sathe and N. K. P. Salve, formed the Vidarbha Rajya Nirman Congress in 2003, with a clear separate Vidarbha-state agenda.

Former member of parliament from Nagpur, Banwarilal Purohit floated the Vidarbha Rajya Party in 2004, just before the loksabha elections, with a clear agenda of the separate Vidarbha state.

After declaration of the separate Telangana state by central Government on 9 December 2009, all these and more than 65 other organizations have joined, demanding the separate Vidarbha state. This umbrella group is known as Vidarbha Rajya Sangram Samitee.

Most prominent amongst this group is the Bharatiya Janata Party, which is committed to the cause of the separate Vidarbha state, as per its national manifesto. Bharipa Bahujan Mahasangh leader Prakash Yashwant Ambedkar, Nationalist Congress Party, Bahujan Samaj Party (BSP), Samajwadi Party (SP), all the factions of Republican Party of India (RPI) have pledged full support to the separate Vidarbha-state movement.

During 2014 Maharashtra Assembly elections, as per some news-reports statehood for Vidarbha became a non-issue and the Vidarbha Rajya Andolan Samiti (VJAS) had appealed to the people of Vidarbha to opt for NOTA (None of the above) option in this election, as no party was raising the issue of a separate Vidarbha State.

== Other related happenings. ==
The Shiv Sena has been opposing it on the plank that Marathi-speaking people shouldn't be divided and on the basis that Samyukta Maharashtra Movement fructified into United Maharashtra after sacrifice of 105 martyrs in agitations for same. In 2009–10, Shiv Sena formed the Akhand Maharashtra Parishad in Vidarbha, to conduct a series of lectures in different regions of Vidarbha by experts on socio-economic and political issues.

== Timeline ==
- Advocate general of Maharashtra government Mr Shrihari Aney resigned from his position 23 March 2016. He did so, to be able to support separate Vidarbha movement full-time and wholeheartedly.
- Vidarbha Maza, the new political party floated by Rajkumar Tirpude, son of Maharashtra's first deputy chief minister late Nashikrao Tirpude, is ready to contest elections starting from those for municipal councils in the region.

== See also ==
- List of proposed states and territories of India
