= Nagpur Lok Sabha constituency =

Lok Sabha constituency in Maharashtra

Coordinates: 21.1°N 79.1°E

Nagpur
- Lok Sabha constituency
- Nagpur Lok Sabha Constituency map

Constituency details
- Country: India
- Region: Western India
- State: Maharashtra
- Assembly constituencies: Nagpur South West; Nagpur South; Nagpur East; Nagpur Central; Nagpur West; Nagpur North
- Established: 1957 (69 years ago)
- Total electors: 22,23,281 (2024)
- Reservation: None

Member of Parliament
- 18th Lok Sabha
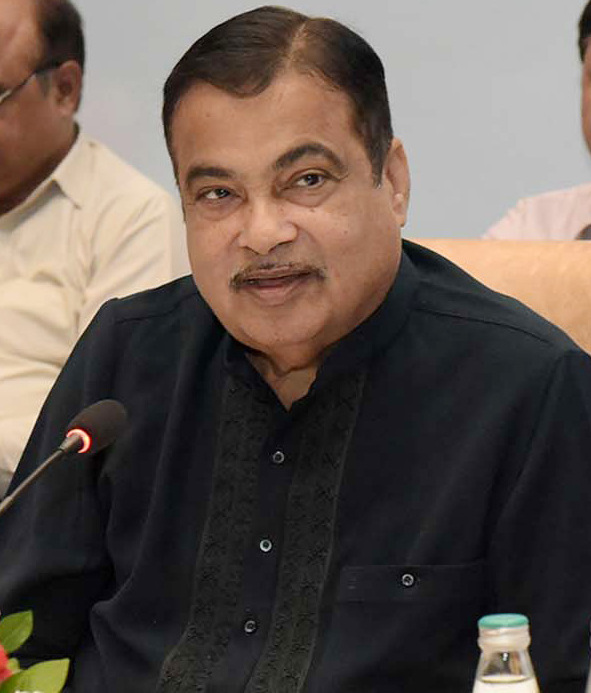
- Incumbent Nitin Gadkari; Union Minister of Road Transport and Highways
- Party: BJP
- Elected year: 2024
- Preceded by: Vilas Muttemwar; INC

Nagpur Lok Sabha seat is one of the 48 Lok Sabha (parliamentary) constituencies of Maharashtra state in western India. This constituency is spread over Nagpur city and some part of Nagpur district.

== Assembly Segments ==
Presently, Nagpur Lok Sabha constituency comprises six Vidhan Sabha (legislative assembly) segments. These segments with constituency numbers and reservation (if any) are:

#	Name	District	MLA, from 2024	MLA's Party	Leading (in 2024 Lok Sabha)
52	Nagpur South West	Nagpur	Devendra Fadnavis	BJP	BJP
53	Nagpur South	Nagpur	Mohan Mate	BJP	BJP
54	Nagpur East	Nagpur	Krishna Khopde	BJP	BJP
55	Nagpur Central	Nagpur	Pravin Datke	BJP	BJP
56	Nagpur West	Nagpur	Vikas Thakare	INC	BJP
57	Nagpur North (SC)	Nagpur	Nitin Raut	INC	INC

== Members of Parliament ==
Year	Name	Party
1952	Anasuyabai Kale	Indian National Congress
1957	Anasuyabai Kale	Indian National Congress
1959^	Madhav Shrihari Aney	Indian National Congress
1962	Madhav Shrihari Aney	Independent
1967	Narendra Deoghare	Indian National Congress
1971	Jambuwantrao Dhote	All India Forward Bloc
1977	Gev Manchersha Avari	Indian National Congress
1980	Jambuwantrao Dhote	Indian National Congress
1984	Banwarilal Purohit	Indian National Congress
1989	Banwarilal Purohit	Indian National Congress
1991	Datta Meghe	Indian National Congress
1996	Banwarilal Purohit	Bharatiya Janata Party
1998	Vilas Muttemwar	Indian National Congress
1999	Vilas Muttemwar	Indian National Congress
2004	Vilas Muttemwar	Indian National Congress
2009	Vilas Muttemwar	Indian National Congress
2014	Nitin Gadkari	Bharatiya Janata Party
2019	Nitin Gadkari	Bharatiya Janata Party
2024	Nitin Gadkari	Bharatiya Janata Party

^ by-poll

== Election results ==
Vote share of winning candidates
2024	54.04%
2019	55.67%
2014	54.17%
2009	41.72%
2004	47.16%
1999	52.38%
1998	57.41%
1996	45.45%
1991	45.97%
1989	38.85%
1984	52.99%
1980	53.85%
1977	44.55%
1971	36.56%
1967	36.56%
1962	40.53%
1957	46.83%
1951	49.30%

=== General election 2024 ===
2024 Indian general election: Nagpur
Party	Candidate	Votes	%	±%
BJP	Nitin Gadkari	655,027	54.04	▼1.63
INC	Vikas Thakre	517,424	42.69	▲5.24
BSP	Yogesh Lanjewar	19,242	1.48	▼1.19
NOTA	None of the above	5,474	0.42	▲0.03
Margin of victory		137,603	11.35	▼16.32
Turnout		1,211,321	54.46	▼0.48
BJP hold		Swing		

=== General election 2019 ===
2019 Indian general election: Nagpur
Party	Candidate	Votes	%	±%
BJP	Nitin Gadkari	660,221	55.67	▲1.50
INC	Nana Patole	444,212	37.45	▲9.53
BSP	Mohammad Jamal	31,725	2.67	▼6.22
NOTA	None of the Above	4,578	0.39	▲0.07
Margin of victory		216,009	18.22	▼8.03
Turnout		11,87,215	54.94	▼2.14
BJP hold		Swing		

=== General election 2014 ===
2014 Indian general election: Nagpur
Party	Candidate	Votes	%	±%
BJP	Nitin Gadkari	587,767	54.17	▲15.68
INC	Vilas Muttemwar	302,919	27.92	▼13.80
BSP	Mohan Gaikwad	96,433	8.89	▼6.83
AAP	Anjali Damania	69,081	6.37	New
NOTA	None of the Above	3,460	0.32	New
Margin of victory		2,84,848	26.25	▲23.02
Turnout		10,85,765	57.12	▲13.68
BJP gain from INC		Swing		

=== General election 2009 ===
2009 Indian general election: Nagpur
Party	Candidate	Votes	%	±%
INC	Vilas Muttemwar	315,148	41.72	▼5.40
BJP	Banwarilal Purohit	290,749	38.49	▲3.87
BSP	Manikrao Vaidya	118,741	15.72	▲8.52
BBM	Yashwant Manohar	4,455	0.59	N/A
IND.	Upasha Taywade	2,800	0.37	N/A
Margin of victory		24,399	3.23	▼9.33
Turnout		7,55,369	43.44	▼5.13
INC hold		Swing		

=== General election 2004 ===
2004 Indian general election: Nagpur
Party	Candidate	Votes	%	±%
INC	Vilas Muttemwar	373,769	47.16	
BJP	Atal Bahadur Singh	274,286	43.41	
BSP	Jayanta Dalvi	57,027	7.19	
Margin of victory		99,483	8.8	
Turnout		792,451	53.50	
INC hold		Swing		

=== General election 1999 ===
1999 Indian general election: Nagpur
Party	Candidate	Votes	%	±%
INC	Vilas Muttemwar	424,450	52.38	
BJP	Vinod Gudadhe Patil	351,755	43.41	
Margin of victory		72,695	8.97	
Turnout		810,365	53.50	
INC hold		Swing		

=== General election 1998 ===
1998 Indian general election: Nagpur
Party	Candidate	Votes	%	±%
INC	Vilas Muttemwar	486,928	57.41	
BJP	Ramesh Mantri	323,646	38.16	
Margin of victory		163,282	19.25	
Turnout		848,161	56.03	
INC gain from BJP		Swing		

=== General election 1996 ===
1996 Indian general election: Nagpur
Party	Candidate	Votes	%	±%
BJP	Banwarilal Purohit	353,547	45.45	
INC	Kunda Vijaykar	232,045	29.83	
RPI(K)	Umakant Ramteke	163,239	20.98	
Margin of victory		121,502	15.62	
Turnout		777,945	51.83	
BJP gain from INC		Swing		

=== General election 1991 ===
1991 Indian general election: Nagpur
Party	Candidate	Votes	%	±%
INC	Datta Meghe	274,448	45.97	
BJP	Banwarilal Purohit	199,728	33.45	
RPI(K)	Iqbal Ahmed	81,318	13.62	
Margin of victory		74,720	12.52	
Turnout		597,047	48.55	
INC hold		Swing		

=== General election 1989 ===
1989 Indian general election: Nagpur
Party	Candidate	Votes	%	±%
INC	Banwarilal Purohit	277,292	38.85	▼14.14
BJP	Arjundas Kukreja	187,292	26.24	▲12.09
CPI	A. B. Bardhan	109,730	15.37	
RPI(K)	Girish Khobragade	99,431	13.93	▼15.48
Margin of victory		90,000	12.61	▼10.97
Turnout		713,718	61.35	▼5.24
INC hold		Swing		

=== General election 1984 ===
1984 Indian general election: Nagpur
Party	Candidate	Votes	%	±%
INC	Banwarilal Purohit	293,739	52.99	
RPI(K)	Shyam Khobragade	163,056	29.41	
BJP	Ramprakash Ahuja	78,458	14.15	
Margin of victory		130,683	23.58	
Turnout		554,354	66.59	
INC gain from INC		Swing		

=== General election 1980 ===
1980 Indian general election: Nagpur
Party	Candidate	Votes	%	±%
INC	Jambuwantrao Dhote	246,397	53.85	
RPI(K)	Shyam Devaji Khobragade	119,954	36.48	
CPI	A. B. Bardhan	70,689	15.45	
Margin of victory		126,443	17.37	
Turnout		457,542	61.90	
INC(I) gain from INC		Swing		

=== General election 1977 ===
1977 Indian general election: Nagpur
Party	Candidate	Votes	%	±%
INC	Gev Manchersha Avari	172,010	44.55	
RPI(K)	B. D. Khobragade	130,457	33.79	
Independent	Jambuwantrao Dhote	79,160	20.50	
Margin of victory		41,553	10.76	
Turnout		386,119	64.40	
INC gain from AIFB		Swing		

=== General election 1971 ===
1971 Indian general election: Nagpur
Party	Candidate	Votes	%	±%
AIFB	Jambuwantrao Dhote	125,552	36.56	
INC	Rikhabchand Sharma	123,496	36.48	
RPI(K)	Datta Appa Katti	55,053	16.26	
CPI	A. B. Bardhan	33,739	9.97	
Margin of victory		2,056	0.08	
Turnout		338,491	55.67	
AIFB gain from INC		Swing		

=== General election 1967 ===
1967 Indian general election: Nagpur
Party	Candidate	Votes	%	±%
INC	Narendra Deoghare	129,736	36.56	
CPI	A. B. Bardhan	97,767	27.55	
Independent	Madhav Shrihari Aney	54,049	15.23	
ABJS	N. L. Belekar	35,332	9.96	
Margin of victory		31,969	9.01	
Turnout		354,903	65.61	
INC gain from Independent		Swing		

=== General election 1962 ===
1962 Indian general election: Nagpur
Party	Candidate	Votes	%	±%
Independent	Madhav Shrihari Aney	131,740	40.53	
INC	Rikhabchand Sharma	84,872	26.11	
RPI	B. D. Khobragade	77,729	23.91	
ABJS	Bachhraj Vyas	30,735	9.45	
Margin of victory		46,868	14.42	
Turnout		325,076	68.69	
Independent gain from INC		Swing		

=== General election 1957 ===
1957 Indian general election: Nagpur
Party	Candidate	Votes	%	±%
INC	Anasuyabai Kale	105,021	46.83	
SCF	Haridas Awade	64,718	28.86	
PSP	Narendra Deoghare	50,189	22.38	
Margin of victory		40,303	17.97	
Turnout		224,244	59.97	
INC hold		Swing		

=== General election 1951 ===
1951 Indian general election: Nagpur
Party	Candidate	Votes	%	±%
INC	Anasuyabai Kale	103,566	49.30	
Socialist	Vinayak Dandekar	44,502	21.18	
KMPP	Purshottam Dekate	33,614	16.00	
HM	Narayan Bhaskar Khare	22,285	10.61	
Margin of victory		59,064	28.12	
Turnout		210,078	59.53	
INC win		Swing		

== See also ==
- Nagpur district
- Ramtek Lok Sabha constituency
- List of constituencies of the Lok Sabha
