= Nagpur West Assembly constituency =

Constituency of the Maharashtra legislative assembly in India

Coordinates: 21.15°N 78.99°E

Nagpur West
- Constituency No. 56 for the Maharashtra Legislative Assembly

Constituency details
- Country: India
- Region: Western India
- State: Maharashtra
- District: Nagpur
- Lok Sabha constituency: Nagpur
- Established: 1957
- Total electors: 388,624
- Reservation: None

Member of Legislative Assembly
- 15th Maharashtra Legislative Assembly
- Incumbent Vikas Pandurang Thakre
- Party: INC
- Alliance: MVA
- Elected year: 2024

Nagpur West Assembly constituency is one of the seats in Maharashtra Legislative Assembly in India. It is one of the six Vidhan Sabha constituencies of Nagpur Lok Sabha constituency.

== Overview ==
Nagpur West (constituency number 56) is one of the 12 Vidhan Sabha constituencies located in the Nagpur district. It is one of the wealthiest constituencies in Nagpur. Areas where the rich and famous of Nagpur live, like Civil Lines, Byramji Town and Jafar Nagar fall in this constituency. The constituency was a BJP stronghold until 2019 when the INC candidate Vikas Thakre beat BJP's Sudhakar Deshmukh and then again in 2024 against BJP's Sudhakar Kohale.

== Extent of the constituency ==
The Assembly Constituency presently comprises the following neighbourhoods:

Neighbourhood
Dharampeth
Ramdaspeth
Shivaji Nagar
Sitabuldi
Ravi Nagar
Hazari Pahad
Ram Nagar
Civil Lines
Sadar
ByRamji Town
Gaddigodam
Friends Colony
GittiKhadaan
Jafar Nagar
Gorewada (Part)
Mankapur (Part)
Zinga Bai Takli (Part)

== Members of the Legislative Assembly ==
Year	Member	Party
Until 1957: Constituency did not exist
1957	A. B. Bardhan	Independent politician
1967	Sushila Balraj	Indian National Congress
1972	Sushila Balraj	Indian National Congress
1978	Mulak Bhaurao Govindrao	Indian National Congress
1980	Gev Manchersha Avari	Indian National Congress
1985	Gev Manchersha Avari	Indian National Congress
1990	Vinod Gudadhe Patil	Bharatiya Janata Party
1995	Vinod Gudadhe Patil	Bharatiya Janata Party
1999	Devendra Fadnavis	Bharatiya Janata Party
2004	Devendra Fadnavis	Bharatiya Janata Party
2009	Sudhakar Shamrao Deshmukh	Bharatiya Janata Party
2014	Sudhakar Shamrao Deshmukh	Bharatiya Janata Party
2019	Vikas Pandurang Thakre	Indian National Congress
2024	Vikas Pandurang Thakre	Indian National Congress

== Election results ==
=== Assembly Election 2024 ===
2024 Maharashtra Legislative Assembly election : Nagpur West
Party	Candidate	Votes	%	±%
INC	Vikas Pandurang Thakre	104,144	47.73	▲0.09
BJP	Sudhakar Vitthalrao Kohale	98,320	45.06	▲1.06
Independent	Narendra Jichkar	8,166	3.74	New
BSP	Prakash Budhaji Gajbhiye	3,482	1.60	▼3.23
VBA	Gourkhede Yash Sudhakar	1,471	0.67	New
NOTA	None of the Above	1,249	0.57	▼1.55
Margin of victory		5,824	2.67	▼0.97
Turnout		219,462	56.47	▲7.95
Total valid votes		218,213		
Registered electors		388,624		▲7.20
INC hold		Swing	▲0.09	

=== Assembly Election 2019 ===
2019 Maharashtra Legislative Assembly election : Nagpur West
Party	Candidate	Votes	%	±%
INC	Vikas Pandurang Thakre	83,252	47.64	▲12.85
BJP	Sudhakar Shamrao Deshmukh	76,885	44.00	▼6.07
BSP	Afzal Omar Farooque	8,427	4.82	▼3.41
NOTA	None of the Above	3,717	2.13	▲1.47
Independent	Singh Manoj Krupashankar	2,201	1.26	New
Independent	Babita Raju Awasthi	2,050	1.17	New
Margin of victory		6,367	3.64	▼11.64
Turnout		179,128	49.41	▼4.21
Total valid votes		174,752		
Registered electors		362,539		▲9.98
INC gain from BJP		Swing	▼2.43	

=== Assembly Election 2014 ===
2014 Maharashtra Legislative Assembly election : Nagpur West
Party	Candidate	Votes	%	±%
BJP	Sudhakar Shamrao Deshmukh	86,500	50.07	▲12.68
INC	Thakre Vikas Pandurang	60,098	34.79	▼1.37
BSP	Ahamad Kadar	14,223	8.23	▲5.63
NCP	Pragati Ajay Patil	4,031	2.33	New
MNS	Prashant Prabhakar Pawar	3,393	1.96	New
SS	Ambhore Vikas Damodhar	1,180	0.68	New
NOTA	None of the Above	1,143	0.66	New
Margin of victory		26,402	15.28	▲14.05
Turnout		174,148	52.83	▲5.38
Total valid votes		172,766		
Registered electors		329,645		▼3.32
BJP hold		Swing	▲12.68	

=== Assembly Election 2009 ===
2009 Maharashtra Legislative Assembly election : Nagpur West
Party	Candidate	Votes	%	±%
BJP	Sudhakar Shamrao Deshmukh	59,955	37.39	▼11.20
INC	Anees Ahmed	57,976	36.16	▼4.87
RPI(A)	Prakash Suryabhan Gajbhiye	21,864	13.64	New
Independent	Gawalbanshi Nitish Gangaprasad	12,633	7.88	New
BSP	Aafi Khan Alias Delnawaz Aijaz Khan	4,180	2.61	▼3.56
Margin of victory		1,979	1.23	▼6.33
Turnout		160,377	47.04	▼5.26
Total valid votes		160,351		
Registered electors		340,973		▼23.44
BJP hold		Swing	▼11.20	

=== Assembly Election 2004 ===
2004 Maharashtra Legislative Assembly election : Nagpur West
Party	Candidate	Votes	%	±%
BJP	Devendra Fadnavis	113,143	48.59	▼0.07
INC	Deshmukh Ranjeetbabu Arvindbabu	95,533	41.02	▼2.97
BSP	Pawar Prashant Prabhakarrao	14,368	6.17	▲4.47
Independent	Dilip Dayaram Choudhary	2,470	1.06	New
Margin of victory		17,610	7.56	▲2.90
Turnout		232,911	52.30	▲3.46
Total valid votes		232,867		
Registered electors		445,371		▲11.57
BJP hold		Swing	▼0.07	

=== Assembly Election 1999 ===
1999 Maharashtra Legislative Assembly election : Nagpur West
Party	Candidate	Votes	%	±%
BJP	Devendra Fadnavis	94,853	48.66	▲6.59
INC	Ashok Dhawad	85,766	44.00	▲20.89
NCP	Balraj Ratnakala Dinesh	3,980	2.04	New
BSP	Vijay G. Kawade	3,318	1.70	New
Independent	Anant Gharad	2,762	1.42	New
CPI	Mohan Sharma	1,891	0.97	New
Margin of victory		9,087	4.66	▼14.30
Turnout		198,843	49.81	▼17.55
Total valid votes		194,930		
Registered electors		399,195		▲17.74
BJP hold		Swing	▲6.59	

=== Assembly Election 1995 ===
1995 Maharashtra Legislative Assembly election : Nagpur West
Party	Candidate	Votes	%	±%
BJP	Vinod Gudadhe Patil	94,698	42.07	▲2.80
INC	Ojha Prabhatai Motilal	52,018	23.11	▼10.00
Independent	Jadhav Dilip Rambhou	32,657	14.51	New
Independent	Dilip Dayaram Choudhary	17,004	7.55	New
BBM	Adv. Ramesh Kisanrao Kothale	7,176	3.19	New
Independent	Yuvanate Chintaman Kashiram	3,825	1.70	New
Independent	Daware Baba Baburao	1,597	0.71	New
Margin of victory		42,680	18.96	▲12.80
Turnout		228,015	67.25	▲16.42
Total valid votes		225,072		
Registered electors		339,059		▲20.79
BJP hold		Swing	▲2.80	

=== Assembly Election 1990 ===
1990 Maharashtra Legislative Assembly election : Nagpur West
Party	Candidate	Votes	%	±%
BJP	Vinod Gudadhe Patil	55,081	39.28	▲10.44
INC	Gev Manchersha Avari	46,438	33.11	▼17.87
JD	Bhorkar Mahadeorao Natthuji	15,188	10.83	New
Independent	Dilip Dayaram Choudhary	7,372	5.26	New
BSP	Ramtake Pushpa Tulshiram	3,715	2.65	New
Independent	Mukundrao Bhikuji Pannase	3,158	2.25	New
Independent	Suresh Bhat	2,661	1.90	New
Margin of victory		8,643	6.16	▼15.99
Turnout		141,589	50.44	▼3.43
Total valid votes		140,244		
Registered electors		280,692		▲54.04
BJP gain from INC		Swing	▼11.71	

=== Assembly Election 1985 ===
1985 Maharashtra Legislative Assembly election : Nagpur West
Party	Candidate	Votes	%	±%
INC	Gev Manchersha Avari	49,607	50.99	New
BJP	Nitin Gadkari	28,055	28.84	▼11.16
Independent	Mangalchand Bagdi	6,996	7.19	New
Independent	Arvind Alias Babasahed Tarekar	6,901	7.09	New
CPI	Mohandas Naidu	3,000	3.08	New
Independent	Bhanji Sadashio Sanesar	1,649	1.69	New
Margin of victory		21,552	22.15	▲12.16
Turnout		98,186	53.88	▲5.22
Total valid votes		97,294		
Registered electors		182,226		▲29.95
INC gain from INC(I)		Swing	▲1.00	

=== Assembly Election 1980 ===
1980 Maharashtra Legislative Assembly election : Nagpur West
Party	Candidate	Votes	%	±%
INC(I)	Gev Manchersha Avari	33,770	49.99	▼2.50
BJP	Dr. Ahuja Ramprakash Sohanlal	27,020	40.00	New
JP	Bhorkar Mahadeorao Natthuji	4,522	6.69	▼31.88
INC(U)	Shirish Damodar Dupalliwar	1,678	2.48	New
Margin of victory		6,750	9.99	▼3.92
Turnout		68,131	48.59	▼22.90
Total valid votes		67,554		
Registered electors		140,223		▲14.65
INC(I) hold		Swing	▼2.50	

=== Assembly Election 1978 ===
1978 Maharashtra Legislative Assembly election : Nagpur West
Party	Candidate	Votes	%	±%
INC(I)	Mulak Bhaurao Govindrao	45,625	52.49	New
JP	Suklikar Sumatibai Balkrishna	33,531	38.57	New
INC	Sushila Balraj	5,072	5.83	▼33.87
Independent	Neware Kanhoo Bajirao	841	0.97	New
Margin of victory		12,094	13.91	▲6.86
Turnout		88,034	71.98	▲7.90
Total valid votes		86,928		
Registered electors		122,306		▲20.74
INC(I) gain from INC		Swing	▲12.78	

=== Assembly Election 1972 ===
1972 Maharashtra Legislative Assembly election : Nagpur West
Party	Candidate	Votes	%	±%
INC	Sushila Balraj	25,410	39.71	▼5.98
ABJS	Sumati B. Suklikar	20,896	32.65	▲2.79
Independent	Mahadeorao N. Bhorkar	13,973	21.84	New
RPI(K)	T. C. Mukharji	2,629	4.11	New
Margin of victory		4,514	7.05	▼8.77
Turnout		65,282	64.45	▲0.62
Total valid votes		63,992		
Registered electors		101,297		▲12.67
INC hold		Swing	▼5.98	

=== Assembly Election 1967 ===
1967 Maharashtra Legislative Assembly election : Nagpur West
Party	Candidate	Votes	%	±%
INC	Sushila Balraj	25,694	45.69	▲25.01
ABJS	Sumati B. Suklikar	16,793	29.86	New
Independent	G. A. Kirde	4,229	7.52	New
Independent	V. S. Dandekar	3,789	6.74	New
Independent	H. K. Agarwal	3,460	6.15	New
Margin of victory		8,901	15.83	▲15.19
Turnout		59,106	65.74	▼57.11
Total valid votes		56,240		
Registered electors		89,905		▼7.61
INC gain from Independent		Swing	▲22.83	

=== Assembly Election 1957 ===
1957 Bombay State Legislative Assembly election : Nagpur West
Party	Candidate	Votes	%	±%
Independent	A. B. Bardhan	26,616	22.86	New
SCF	Shambharkar Punjabrao Hukam (Sc)	25,878	22.22	New
INC	Borkar Anusayabai W/O Bhaurao (Sc)	24,073	20.67	New
INC	Gawande Wamanrao Govindrao	24,012	20.62	New
PSP	Awari Manchearsha Rusramji	11,822	10.15	New
Independent	Changole Vinayak Jagannath (Sc)	2,427	2.08	New
Independent	Nagabai W/O Kesheao Alias Chintaman (Sc)	1,619	1.39	New
Margin of victory		738	0.63	
Turnout		116,447	119.66	
Total valid votes		116,447		
Registered electors		97,312		
Independent win (new seat)				

== See also ==
- List of constituencies of Maharashtra Vidhan Sabha
