= VJC =

VJC may refer to:

- Victoria Junior College, a co-educational junior college in Singapore
- Vidarbha Janata Congress, a political party in the Indian state of Maharashtra
- VJC, the ICAO code for VietJet Air, a Vietnamese airline company
