= Nagpur South Assembly constituency =

Constituency of the Maharashtra legislative assembly in India

Coordinates: 21.08°N 79.09°E

Nagpur South
- Constituency No. 53 for the Maharashtra Legislative Assembly

Constituency details
- Country: India
- Region: Western India
- State: Maharashtra
- District: Nagpur
- Lok Sabha constituency: Nagpur
- Established: 1978
- Total electors: 394,586
- Reservation: None

Member of Legislative Assembly
- 15th Maharashtra Legislative Assembly
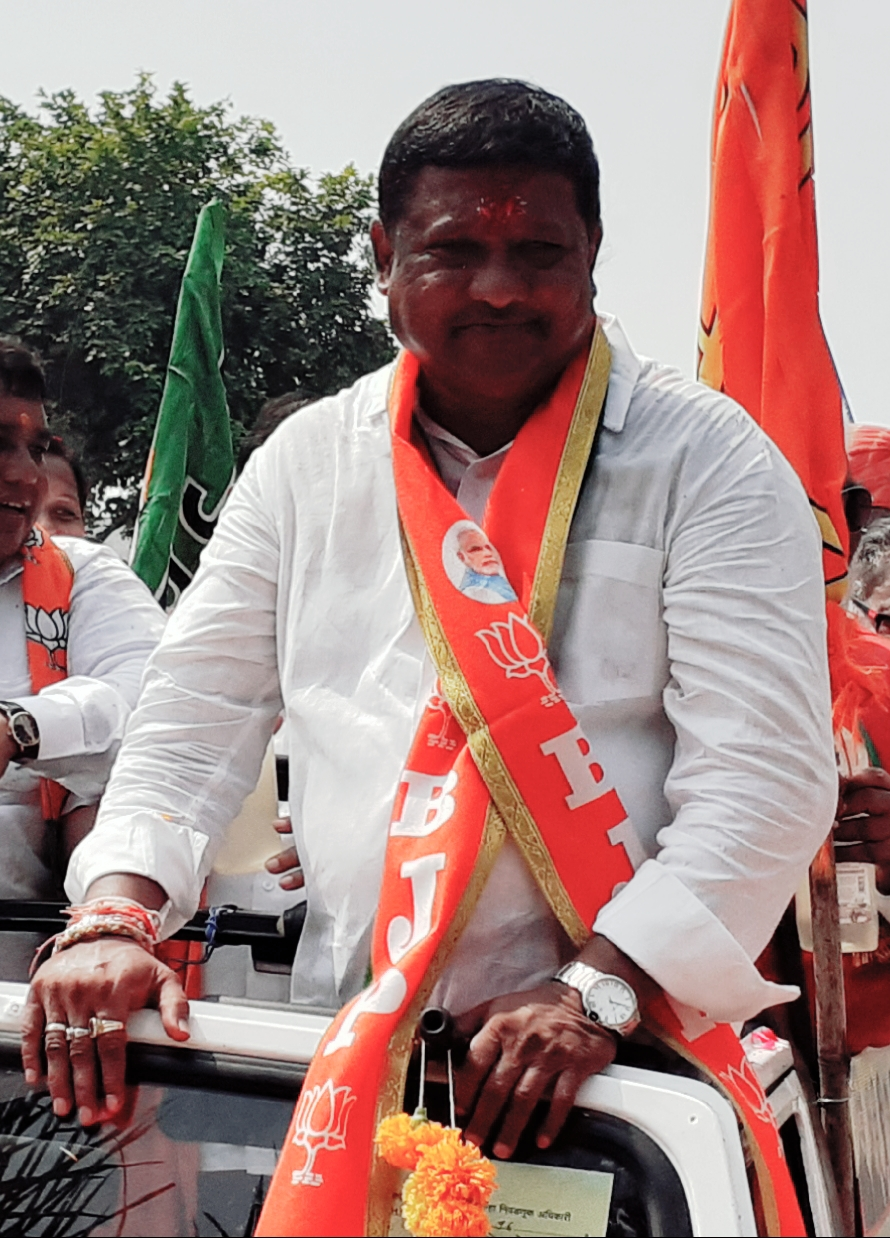
- Incumbent Mohan Mate
- Party: BJP
- Alliance: NDA
- Elected year: 2024

Nagpur South Assembly constituency is one of the 288 Vidhan Sabha (legislative assembly) constituencies of Maharashtra state, western India. It is one of the six assembly seats which make up Nagpur Lok Sabha constituency. The Constituency Number is 53. This constituency is located in Nagpur district. The boundaries of the constituency were changed by the 2008 delimitation. It comprises parts of Nagpur Taluka, and Ward No. 9 to 11, 37 to 42, 73 to 78, 99 to 102 and 120 of Nagpur Municipal Corporation.

== Members of the Legislative Assembly ==
Year	Member	Party
Until 1978: Constituency did not exist
1978	Govindrao Marotrao Wanjari	Indian National Congress
1980	Banwarilal Purohit	Indian National Congress
1985	Ashok Dhawad	Indian National Congress
1990	Ashok Dhawad	Indian National Congress
1995	Ashok Wadibhasme	Bharatiya Janata Party
1999	Mohan Mate	Bharatiya Janata Party
2004	Govindrao Marotrao Wanjari	Indian National Congress
2005^	Dinanath Padole	Indian National Congress
2009	Dinanath Padole	Indian National Congress
2014	Sudhakar Kohale	Bharatiya Janata Party
2019	Mohan Mate	Bharatiya Janata Party
2024	Mohan Mate	Bharatiya Janata Party

^by-election

== Election results ==
=== Assembly Election 2024 ===
2024 Maharashtra Legislative Assembly election : Nagpur South
Party	Candidate	Votes	%	±%
BJP	Mohan Gopalrao Mate	117,526	51.78%	▲7.62
INC	Girish Krishnarao Pandav	101,868	44.88%	▲2.83
BSP	Sanjay Deorao Somkuwar	1,970	0.87%	▼2.10
VBA	Satyabhama Ramesh Lokhande	1,890	0.83%	▼2.09
NOTA	None of the Above	1,285	0.57%	▼0.67
Margin of victory		15,658	6.90%	▲4.80
Turnout		228,275	57.85%	▲7.59
Total valid votes		226,990		
Registered electors		394,586		▲3.16
BJP hold		Swing	▲7.62	

=== Assembly Election 2019 ===
2019 Maharashtra Legislative Assembly election : Nagpur South
Party	Candidate	Votes	%	±%
BJP	Mohan Gopalrao Mate	84,339	44.15%	▼0.48
INC	Girish Krishnarao Pandav	80,326	42.05%	▲21.17
BSP	Shankar Pundalik Thool	5,668	2.97%	▼9.76
VBA	Ramesh Krishnarao Pishe	5,583	2.92%	New
Independent	Satish Vitthalrao Hole	4,631	2.42%	New
Independent	Kishor Ratanlal Kumeriya	4,426	2.32%	New
Independent	Pramod Nathuji Manmode	4,274	2.24%	New
NOTA	None of the Above	2,353	1.23%	▲0.53
Margin of victory		4,013	2.10%	▼21.65
Turnout		193,571	50.61%	▼3.23
Total valid votes		191,013		
Registered electors		382,493		▲11.75
BJP hold		Swing	▼0.48	

=== Assembly Election 2014 ===
2014 Maharashtra Legislative Assembly election : Nagpur South
Party	Candidate	Votes	%	±%
BJP	Sudhakar Vitthalrao Kohale	81,224	44.63%	New
INC	Satish Chaturvedi	38,010	20.89%	▼23.48
BSP	Satyabhama Ramesh Lokhande	23,156	12.72%	▲6.15
Independent	Shekhar Sawarbandhe	15,107	8.30%	New
SS	Pandav Kiran Krushnarao	13,863	7.62%	▼17.41
NCP	Dinanath Padole	4,194	2.30%	New
Democratic Secular Party	Shakil Patel	3,400	1.87%	New
NOTA	None of the Above	1,276	0.70%	New
Margin of victory		43,214	23.75%	▲4.40
Turnout		183,263	53.54%	▲5.43
Total valid votes		181,977		
Registered electors		342,268		▲4.00
BJP gain from INC		Swing	▲0.26	

=== Assembly Election 2009 ===
2009 Maharashtra Legislative Assembly election : Nagpur South
Party	Candidate	Votes	%	±%
INC	Dinanath Deorao Padole	69,711	44.37%	▲17.63
SS	Kishor Ratanlal Kumeriya	39,316	25.02%	New
Independent	Mohan Gopalrao Mate	16,018	10.20%	New
BSP	Uttam Shewde	10,326	6.57%	▲0.45
Independent	Ashok Dhawad	6,611	4.21%	New
RPI(A)	Kishor Chindhuji Gajbhiye	4,681	2.98%	New
MNS	Sanjay Laxman Patil	3,364	2.14%	New
Margin of victory		30,395	19.35%	▲17.37
Turnout		157,488	47.85%	▼0.63
Total valid votes		157,107		
Registered electors		329,096		▲41.54
INC hold		Swing	▲17.63	

=== Assembly By-election 2005 ===
2005 Maharashtra Legislative Assembly by-election : Nagpur South
Party	Candidate	Votes	%	±%
INC	Dinanath Deorao Padole	30,073	26.74%	▼9.47
BJP	Ashok Mahadeorao Mankar	27,846	24.76%	▼4.12
Independent	Kumbhare Sulekha Narayanrao	26,752	23.79%	New
Independent	Abhijit Wanjarri	19,156	17.03%	New
BSP	Adv. Ashok Yawle	6,885	6.12%	▼15.37
Margin of victory		2,227	1.98%	▼5.35
Turnout		112,469	48.37%	▼4.57
Total valid votes		112,469		
Registered electors		232,510		▲0.03
INC hold		Swing	▼9.47	

=== Assembly Election 2004 ===
2004 Maharashtra Legislative Assembly election : Nagpur South
Party	Candidate	Votes	%	±%
INC	Govindrao Marotrao Wanjari	44,551	36.21%	▲3.37
BJP	Mohan Gopalrao Mate	35,537	28.88%	▼6.37
BSP	Kiran Krishnarao Pandav	26,439	21.49%	▲20.26
BBM	Raju Jyotiramji Lokhande	12,056	9.80%	▼13.61
Margin of victory		9,014	7.33%	▲4.91
Turnout		123,070	52.95%	▼0.28
Total valid votes		123,045		
Registered electors		232,432		▲10.76
INC gain from BJP		Swing	▲0.95	

=== Assembly Election 1999 ===
1999 Maharashtra Legislative Assembly election : Nagpur South
Party	Candidate	Votes	%	±%
BJP	Mohan Gopalrao Mate	39,374	35.25%	▼0.20
INC	Wanjari Govindarao Marotrao	36,679	32.84%	▲6.70
BBM	Raju Jyotiram Lokhande	26,142	23.41%	▲2.87
NCP	Pramod Vinayakrao Darne	6,563	5.88%	New
BSP	Journlist Uttam Shewde	1,368	1.22%	▼5.30
Margin of victory		2,695	2.41%	▼6.89
Turnout		114,329	54.48%	▼13.18
Total valid votes		111,692		
Registered electors		209,861		▲0.51
BJP hold		Swing	▼0.20	

=== Assembly Election 1995 ===
1995 Maharashtra Legislative Assembly election : Nagpur South
Party	Candidate	Votes	%	±%
BJP	Ashok Ramchandra Wadibhasme	49,151	35.45%	▲4.81
INC	Dhawad Ashok Shankarrao	36,248	26.14%	▼11.06
BBM	Lokhande Raju Jyotiram	28,478	20.54%	New
BSP	Hiwarkar Pandurang Marotrao	9,052	6.53%	▲2.95
Independent	Lute Jayantrao Urkudaji	7,510	5.42%	New
JD	Raut Purushottam Bhaurao	2,077	1.50%	▼3.84
Margin of victory		12,903	9.31%	▲2.74
Turnout		140,283	67.18%	▲11.70
Total valid votes		138,656		
Registered electors		208,805		▲19.09
BJP gain from INC		Swing	▼1.75	

=== Assembly Election 1990 ===
1990 Maharashtra Legislative Assembly election : Nagpur South
Party	Candidate	Votes	%	±%
INC	Dhawad Ashok Shankarrao	35,682	37.20%	▼15.22
BJP	Wadibhame Ashok Ramchander	29,387	30.64%	New
RPI(K)	Narayan Fuktuji Meshram	8,989	9.37%	New
RPI	Ramesh Jotiram Lokhande	5,199	5.42%	▼17.67
JD	Ashok Haribhau Shamkuwar	5,118	5.34%	New
BSP	P. S. Changole	3,429	3.58%	New
Independent	Haribhau Jagobaji Naik	3,058	3.19%	New
Margin of victory		6,295	6.56%	▼22.76
Turnout		96,730	55.17%	▼3.32
Total valid votes		95,915		
Registered electors		175,329		▲31.72
INC hold		Swing	▼15.22	

=== Assembly Election 1985 ===
1985 Maharashtra Legislative Assembly election : Nagpur South
Party	Candidate	Votes	%	±%
INC	Dhawad Ashok Shankarrao	40,488	52.42%	New
RPI	Ramteke Umakant Rambhau	17,837	23.09%	▲22.08
IC(S)	Dupalliwar Shirish Damodhar	16,335	21.15%	New
Independent	Agne Balasaheb Narayanrao	1,782	2.31%	New
Margin of victory		22,651	29.33%	▲9.35
Turnout		77,837	58.47%	▲7.61
Total valid votes		77,238		
Registered electors		133,112		▲12.64
INC gain from INC(I)		Swing	▼1.24	

=== Assembly Election 1980 ===
1980 Maharashtra Legislative Assembly election : Nagpur South
Party	Candidate	Votes	%	±%
INC(I)	Banwarilal Purohit	31,965	53.66%	▼3.15
RPI(K)	Dhepe Ramanand Dewaji	20,064	33.68%	▼0.85
INC(U)	Chawhan Pratapsingh Ramkisansingh	5,768	9.68%	New
RPI	Nimbalkar Waman Sudama	602	1.01%	New
Margin of victory		11,901	19.98%	▼2.30
Turnout		60,141	50.89%	▼22.64
Total valid votes		59,575		
Registered electors		118,177		▲8.91
INC(I) hold		Swing	▼3.15	

=== Assembly Election 1978 ===
1978 Maharashtra Legislative Assembly election : Nagpur South
Party	Candidate	Votes	%	±%
INC(I)	Vanjari Govindrao Marotrao	45,025	56.81%	New
RPI(K)	Dhepe Ramanand Dewaji	27,368	34.53%	New
INC	Agrawal Madangopal Jodhraj	2,809	3.54%	New
Independent	Choube Umeshchander Dayashankar	1,681	2.12%	New
Independent	Nimbalkar Wamanrao Sakharam	789	1.00%	New
Independent	Gote Punjabrao Somaji	512	0.65%	New
Margin of victory		17,657	22.28%	
Turnout		80,535	74.22%	
Total valid votes		79,261		
Registered electors		108,505		
INC(I) win (new seat)				
