= Sudhakar Deshmukh =

Indian politician

Member of Legislative Assembly, Maharashtra
- In office 2009–2019
- Preceded by: Devendra Fadnavis
- Succeeded by: Vikas Pandurang Thakre
- Constituency: Nagpur West

Member of Legislative Council
- In office 1991–1996
- Preceded by: Vinod Gudadhe Patil
- Constituency: Maharashtra

Personal details
- Born: 11 October 1957 (age 68) Nagpur, Maharashtra, India
- Party: Joined Bharatiya Janata Party in 2000
- Education: Hislop College Nagpur; Commerce
- Occupation: Politician
- Website: www.mahabjp.org

Sudhakar Shamrao Deshmukh (born 11 October 1957) was a member of the 13th Maharashtra Legislative Assembly. He represented the Nagpur West Assembly Constituency. He belongs to the Bharatiya Janata Party (BJP). Deshmukh was also member of the 12th Assembly (2009–2014). Deshmukh was the president of Indian National Congress's (INC) Nagpur district committee. Deshmukh, then with the Indian National Congress, was member of Maharashtra Legislative Council from 1991 to 1996. He joined the BJP in 2000 and was the president of BJP's Nagpur city unit in 2007. Deshmukh is a commerce graduate from Nagpur University.

== Early life ==
Deshmukh was an active member of Indian National Congress. He joined BJP in 2000.

== Education and early career ==
Deshmukh is a commerce graduate from Nagpur University.

== Political career ==
MLA Nagpur West in 2009

=== Positions held ===
==== Within BJP ====
- Nagpur City President, BJP (2006)
  - State Vice President, BJP (2003)
- Advisor to Ex-President of Maharashtra BJP
  Devendra Fadnavis

==== Legislative ====
- Member, Maharashtra Legislative Council - 1991-1996
- Member, Maharashtra Legislative Assembly - 2 consecutive terms, since 2009
