= Dushyant Chaturvedi =

Indian politician

- दुष्यंत चतुर्वेदी

Member of Maharashtra Legislative Council
- Incumbent
- Assumed office 22 June 2026
- Preceded by: Himself
- Constituency: Yavatmal Local Authorities
- In office 5 Feb 2020 – 06 Dec 2022
- Preceded by: Tanaji Sawant
- Constituency: Yavatmal Local Authorities

Personal details
- Born: 21 May 1979 (age 47) Nagpur, Maharashtra
- Party: Shiv Sena (2019-Present)
- Other political affiliations: Indian National Congress (until 2019)
- Relations: Satish Chaturvedi (father)

Dushyant Satish Chaturvedi (Marathi: दुष्यंत चतुर्वेदी) is a Shiv Sena politician from Nagpur, Maharashtra. He is a current Member of Legislative Council from Yavatmal local authorities constituency. He is the son of Satish Chaturvedi, a former Indian National Congress minister and 5 term MLA from Nagpur East.

== Positions held ==
- 2020: Elected to Maharashtra Legislative Council.
- 2026: re-elected to Maharashtra legislative council from Yavatmal Local Authorities for a second term.
- Director (Governing Board) of Lokmanya Tilak JanKalyan Shikshan Sanstha (LTJSS) Groups of Institutions.
