= Jambuwantrao Dhote =

Indian politician

Bhau Jambhuwantrao Dhote

Member of Maharashtra Legislative Assembly
- In office (1962-1964),(1964-1967),(1967-1972),(1978 – 1980)
- Preceded by: Ramchandra Jagoba Kadu Gharfalkar
- Succeeded by: Trambak Deshmukh Parvekar alias Abasaheb Parvekar
- Constituency: Yavatmal

Member of Parliament, Lok Sabha
- In office (1971-1977),(1980 – 1984)
- Preceded by: Narendra R Deoghare; Gev Manchersha Avari
- Succeeded by: Banwarilal Purohit
- Constituency: Nagpur

Personal details
- Born: 1939
- Died: 18 February 2017 (aged 77–78)
- Party: All India Forward Bloc, Indian National Congress, Vidarbha Janata Congress & Shivsena
- Spouse: Mrs. Vijaya Jambhuwantrao Dhote
- Relations: Ramrao Adik (father-in-law)
- Children: Adv. Kranti Dhote Raut & Jwala Dhote
- Occupation: Politician & Social Worker.

Jambhuwantrao Bapurao Dhote (1939 – 18 February 2017) was an Indian politician. Known by his supporters as The Lion of Vidharbha & Vidarbha Kesari. He is son-in-law of veteran Congress leader late Ramrao Adik.

Dhote left INC soon, and founded Vidarbha Janata Congress Party on 9 September 2002. He was elected to Maharashtra Assembly 5 times. He was elected from Yavatmal in 1962 and 1967 elections as a All India Forward Bloc candidate, and in 1978 as Congress member.

He was Member of Parliament from Nagpur Lok Sabha constituency in 1971 to 5th Lok Sabha, defeating his Congress rival. When Indira Gandhi split Congress in January 1978, he joined her Congress(I) party. He was elected for second time from Nagpur in 1980 to 7th Lok Sabha as a Congress candidate.

He died on 18 February 2017 due to a heart attack in Yavatmal. He can be remembered as the only 'mass leader' of Vidarbha to date.
