= Gev Manchersha Avari =

Indian politician

Gev. Mancharsha Avari

Member of Parliament, Lok Sabha
- In office 1977–1980
- Preceded by: Jambuwantrao Dhote
- Succeeded by: Jambuwantrao Dhote
- Constituency: Nagpur

Member of Legislative Assembly, Maharashtra
- In office (1980-1985), (1985 – 1990)
- Preceded by: Bhaurao Govindrao Mulak
- Succeeded by: Vinod Gudadhe Patil
- Constituency: Nagpur West

Personal details
- Born: 31 July 1950 (age 75) Nagpur, India
- Party: Indian National Congress
- Website: https://www.generalavari.com

Gev. Mancharsha Avari is an Indian politician. He was elected to the Lok Sabha, the lower house of the Parliament of India, from Nagpur as a member of the Indian National Congress in 1977.

He was elected to Maharashtra Assembly twice, in 1980 and 1985. His father, Manchersha Awari, was also a politician.
