= Krishna Khopde =

Indian politician

Krishna Bhau Khopde

Member of Maharashtra Legislative Assembly
- Incumbent
- Assumed office 2010
- Preceded by: Satish Chaturvedi
- Constituency: Nagpur East

President of Bharatiya Janata Party – Nagpur City
- In office 24 March 2012 – 16 January 2016
- President: Sudhir Mungantiwar; Devendra Fadnavis; Raosaheb Danve
- Preceded by: Anil Sole
- Succeeded by: Sudhakar Kohale

Deputy Mayor of Nagpur
- In office 20 January 1995 – 4 February 1996
- Mayor: Rajesh Tambe
- Preceded by: Eknathrao Jog
- Succeeded by: Shankarrao Nikhare

Personal details
- Born: 6 March 1959 (age 67) Nagpur, Bombay State, India
- Party: Bharatiya Janata Party
- Spouse: Sandhya Khopde
- Children: Abhilash & Rohit
- Occupation: Politician
- Website: www.mahabjp.org

Krishna Pancham Khopde (born 6 March 1959) is a member of the 13th Maharashtra Legislative Assembly, in India. He represents the Nagpur East Assembly Constituency. He belongs to the Bharatiya Janata Party (BJP). He is BJP sitting member, having been a member of the 12 Maharashtra Legislative Assembly too. Khopde in 2014 was the chief of the Nagpur City BJP. In 2009 he created a major upset defeating 5 time MLA Satish Chaturvedi of the Indian National Congress. Khopde was a corporator in the Nagpur Municipal Corporation and a standing committee chairman. Khopde is a high school dropout.

His political career commenced in the early nineties, when he became President of the Bharatiya Janata Yuva Morcha (youth wing of the BJP) in Nagpur. At the age of 33, Khopde became the Municipal Corporator of the Nagpur Municipal Corporation and served as corporator for 5 consecutive terms, in 1992 to 2014. He was the Deputy Mayor elected in Nagpur Municipal Corporation India, when he served as the Deputy Mayor of Nagpur Municipal Corporation at the age of 36, in 1995-1996.

== Family and personal life ==
Krishna Khopde married Sandhya in 1991. They have two sons named Abhilash & Rohit.

== Political career ==
In 1992, at age 33, Khopde was elected as a Corporator from Satnami Nagar ward. Three years later Khopde became the Deputy Mayor of the Nagpur Municipal Corporation. In 2008, he was elected to the Standing Committee Chairman Nagpur Municipal Corporation. In 2009 he was elected to the Maharashtra Legislative Assembly for the first time. He was serving his second term as MLA as of 2014.

=== Positions held ===
==== Within BJP ====
- Office Bearer, Nagpur (East) BJP
- Nagpur President, BJYM
- Nagpur President, BJP (24 March 2012 to 12 Jan 2013)
- Re-elected Nagpur President, BJP Since 12 Jan 2013

==== Legislative ====
- Deputy Mayor, Nagpur Municipal Corporation Nagpur City – (1995 to 1996)
- Standing Committee Chairman Nagpur Municipal Corporation - (2008-2009)
- Member, Maharashtra Legislative Assembly - Since 2009
