= Banwarilal Purohit =

Former Governor of Punjab

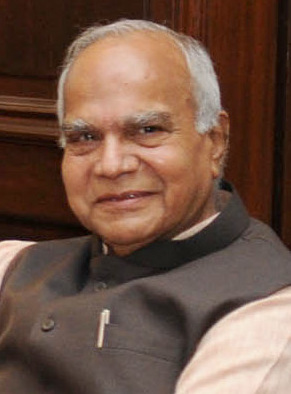
- Purohit c. 2016

29th Governor of Punjab
- In office 31 August 2021 – 28 July 2024
- President: Ram Nath Kovind; Droupadi Murmu
- Chief Minister: Amarinder Singh; Charanjit Singh Channi; Bhagwant Mann
- Preceded by: V. P. Singh Badnore
- Succeeded by: Gulab Chand Kataria

16th Administrator of Chandigarh
- In office 31 August 2021 – 28 July 2024
- President: Ram Nath Kovind; Droupadi Murmu
- Preceded by: V. P. Singh Badnore
- Succeeded by: Gulab Chand Kataria

14th Governor of Tamil Nadu
- In office 6 October 2017 – 17 September 2021
- President: Ram Nath Kovind
- Chief Minister: Edappadi K. Palaniswami; M. K. Stalin
- Preceded by: C. Vidyasagar Rao (additional charge)
- Succeeded by: R. N. Ravi

25th Governor of Assam
- In office 22 August 2016 – 29 September 2017
- President: Pranab Mukherjee; Ram Nath Kovind
- Chief Minister: Sarbananda Sonowal
- Preceded by: Padmanabha Acharya (additional charge)
- Succeeded by: Jagdish Mukhi

16th Governor of Meghalaya
- Additional charge
- In office 27 January 2017 – 5 October 2017
- President: Ram Nath Kovind
- Chief Minister: Mukul Sangma
- Preceded by: V. Shanmuganathan
- Succeeded by: Ganga Prasad

Member of Parliament, Lok Sabha
- In office (1984–1989), (1989 – 1991)
- Preceded by: Jambuwantrao Dhote
- Succeeded by: Datta Meghe
- Constituency: Nagpur
- In office (1996–1998)
- Preceded by: Datta Meghe
- Succeeded by: Vilas Muttemwar
- Constituency: Nagpur

Member of Maharashtra Legislative Assembly
- In office (1978–1980)
- Preceded by: Narendra Deoghare
- Succeeded by: Satish Chaturvedi
- Constituency: Nagpur East
- In office (1980–1985)
- Preceded by: Govindrao Marotrao Wanjari
- Succeeded by: Ashok Dhawad
- Constituency: Nagpur South

Personal details
- Born: Banwarilal Bhagwandas Purohit; 16 April 1940 (age 86) Nawalgarh, Rajputana Agency, British India (present-day Rajasthan, India)
- Party: Bharatiya Janata Party (2009–Present), (1991–1999)
- Other political affiliations: Indian National Congress (1978–1991), (1999–2009)

Banwarilal Bhagwandas Purohit (born 16 April 1940) is an Indian politician. He was the former Governor of Punjab, India and Administrator of Chandigarh from September 2021 to July 2024, Governor of Tamil Nadu from 2017 to 2021, and Governor of Assam from 2016 to 2017. He is a member of the Bharatiya Janata Party. He was a Member of Parliament from the Nagpur (Lok Sabha constituency) three times, twice as an Indian National Congress member, once as a BJP member.

== Political career ==
Later he joined Congress. After Indira Gandhi split the Congress and formed Congress (Indira), Purohit was elected as MLA from Nagpur East constituency in 1978, contesting as a member of Congress(I), and he was re-elected in 1980 from Nagpur South and became a Minister of State for Urban Development, Slum Improvement and Housing in 1982.

In 1984, he was elected to the 8th Lok Sabha as member of Congress. He was re-elected in 1989 on Congress ticket.

Later he joined the Bharatiya Janata Party when it launched a movement to build Ram Temple in Ayodhya and contested Lok Sabha elections in 1991 as the BJP candidate. But he lost to Datta Meghe of Indian National Congress. In 1996, he was elected to 11th Lok Sabha as BJP's candidate.

In 1999, he quit the Bharatiya Janata Party to join the Indian National Congress after he developed serious differences with Pramod Mahajan. He contested the Lok Sabha elections from Ramtek in 1999 but lost.

In 2003, he launched his own party called Vidarbha Rajya Party and contested the Lok Sabha elections from Nagpur in 2004 but lost.

Later on, he again joined the BJP.

In 2009, he again contested on BJP's ticket but lost the election to Vilas Muttemwar of Indian National Congress.

== Governorship ==
In August 2016, Purohit was appointed Governor of Assam by replacing Padmanabha Acharya who had additional in-charge of Assam.

On 30 September 2017 he was appointed Governor of Tamil Nadu by President Ram Nath Kovind. It was the first time that the state has got a full time governor after K Rosaiah retired in August 2016.

On 27 August 2021 he was appointed the Governor of Punjab (additional charge) and Administrator of Chandigarh (additional charge).

On 9 September 2021, Purohit was appointed the 29th Governor of Punjab. Purohit resigned from the post on 3 February 2024 citing personal reasons. His resignation was accepted on 28 July 2024.

== Other career ==
Purohit gained ownership of the Nagpur daily newspaper The Hitavada from Servants of India Society in 1979. The newspaper was launched by Gopal Krishna Gokhale in 1911 and Purohit is its current managing editor. He is also the chairman of Shri Ramdeobaba University RBU in Nagpur.

== Early life ==
His father's name is Bhagwandas Purohit, he is married to Pushpa Devi Purohit, and he has three children. Two sons Rajendra Purohit and Rakesh Purohit, daughter Meena Purohit Joshi. He has six grandchildren and a great grandson. His eldest granddaughter, Archana Purohit Agrawal is a business coach, startup founder and author for the Book Agency Adda. He is also the chairman of Bhavans Bhagwandas Purohit Vidya Mandir Nagpur. He is the chairman of Bharatiya Vidya Bhavan schools founded by late Kanaiyalal Maneklal Munshi in 1938.

Lok Sabha
Preceded by Jambuwantrao Dhote	Member of Parliament for Nagpur; 1984–1991	Succeeded by Datta Meghe
Preceded by Datta Meghe	Member of Parliament for Nagpur; 1996–1998	Succeeded by Vilas Muttemwar
Political offices
Preceded by Padmanabha Acharya	Governor of Assam; 22 August 2016 – 10 October 2017	Succeeded by Jagdish Mukhi
Preceded by V. Shanmuganathan	Governor of Meghalaya; 27 January 2017 – 5 October 2017	Succeeded by Ganga Prasad
Preceded by C. Vidyasagar Rao	Governor of Tamil Nadu; 6 October 2017 – 17 September 2021	Succeeded by R. N. Ravi
Preceded by V. P. Singh Badnore	Governor of Punjab; 31 August 2021 – 2 February 2024	Succeeded by Ritu Bahri (acting)
Preceded by V. P. Singh Badnore	Administrator of Chandigarh; 31 August 2021 – 2 February 2024	Succeeded by
