= Anasuyabai Kale =

Indian politician

Member of Parliament, Lok Sabha
- In office 1952–1959
- Succeeded by: Madhav Shrihari Aney
- Constituency: Nagpur

Personal details
- Party: Indian National Congress
- Spouse: Purushottam Balakrishna Kale
- Children: 3 sons and 2 daughters

Anasuyabai Kale was an Indian politician and social activist. She was elected to the Lok Sabha, the lower house of the Parliament of India, from Nagpur as a member of the Indian National Congress in 1952. She was re-elected as a member of the 2nd Lok Sabha in 1957.

== Career and work ==
Prior to her election to the Lok Sabha, Kale had been a member of the Assembly of the Central Provinces and Berar, to which she was nominated in 1928. In 1930 she resigned and again travelled with Mahatma Gandhi in the Central Provinces to campaign against untouchability. She worked for the betterment of tribal people. In 1935, she was president of the Nagpur Congress Committee. In 1936, she presided over the Central Provinces Harijan Conference in Mohapa. In 1937, she was again elected to the Central Provinces and Berar Legislature and in this tenure also served as Deputy Speaker.

She was active in the field of women rights and their social upliftment. She was member of the All India Women's Conference and in 1937 influenced the Conference to actively undertake women's political and social problems on forefront. In 1948, she was elected as the president of the All India Women's Conference.

== Personal life ==
She was a descendant of the Diwan of Aundh state and came from a Chitpavan Brahmin family. Her father was a lawyer. She was educated at Huzurpaga High School and Fergusson College in Poona and then at Baroda College, Baroda. She married into the cadet branch of Kale of Waghere, Nashik. In 1916, she married Purushottam Balakrishna Kale, a widower. She had three sons and two daughters. After winning Lok Sabha election from Nagpur in 1957, she died mid-term two years later.
