= Nagpur Pact =

1953 Indian pact creating Maharashtra

The Nagpur Pact was concluded between Indian political leaders on 28 September 1953. It led to the creation of the state of Maharashtra from contiguous Marathi-speaking areas of the then Bombay State, Madhya Pradesh and Hyderabad State.

The Government of India appointed the first States Reorganisation Commission under the chairmanship of Fazl Ali on 29 December 1953.

Leaders like Madhav Shrihari Aney and Brajlal Biyani submitted a memorandum to the State Reorganisation Commission (SR) for a separate Vidarbha State. The SRC, after considering the memorandum and all other related aspects, favoured a separate "Vidarbha State" with Nagpur as capital. But even after the recommendation of SRC headed by Fazl Ali, Vidarbha was made part of bilingual Bombay State in 1956 and Nagpur city lost the capital status. Nagpur thus became the only city in independent India to lose state capital status, after being a capital of India's biggest state (by area) for more than 100 years. Tension began to flare in Nagpur. It was even asserted that Nagpur should be made capital of new state of Maharashtra. Further the memorandum submitted by M. S. Aney and Biyani was rejected.

Leaders of Maharashtra met these fears half-way, by ensuring the maintenance of bench of High Court and a session of Legislature at Nagpur. The informal pact between political leaders before 1960 thus made Nagpur the second capital of Maharashtra.

The Pact assured equitable development of all the regions of the proposed Marathi State. The most prominent clause of the Nagpur Pact required one session of the Maharashtra state assembly in Nagpur every year, with minimum six weeks' duration, to discuss exclusively points related to Vidarbha.

The signatory to the pact in 1953 were;-

- Yashwantrao Chavan
- Gopalrao Bajirao Khedkar
- Ramrao Krishnarao Patil, Gandhian, Ex ICS Officer and member of first Planning Commission.

Before the formation of Maharashtra State, the nine member committee appointed by Congress Working Committee for the re-organisation of Bombay State recognised that strong sentiment existed among many people of Vidarbha for the formation of a separate state. But still it expressed its preference for the inclusion of Vidarbha in the new Bombay State.

As a result of these changes, in 1962 general elections, Congress won only one assembly seat out of four from Nagpur, that with a narrow margin, and Nagpur Lok Sabha constituency was won by M S Aney of Nag Vidarbha Andolan Samiti.
