= Nagpur East Assembly constituency =

Constituency of the Maharashtra legislative assembly in India

Coordinates: 21.157°N 79.163°E

Nagpur East
- Constituency No. 54 for the Maharashtra Legislative Assembly

Constituency details
- Country: India
- Region: Western India
- State: Maharashtra
- District: Nagpur
- Lok Sabha constituency: Nagpur
- Established: 1967
- Total electors: 419,061
- Reservation: None

Member of Legislative Assembly
- 15th Maharashtra Legislative Assembly
- Incumbent Krishna Khopde
- Party: BJP
- Alliance: NDA
- Elected year: 2024

Nagpur East Assembly constituency is one of the 288 Vidhan Sabha (legislative assembly) constituencies of Maharashtra state, western India. It is one of the six assembly seats which make up Nagpur Lok Sabha constituency. The Constituency Number is 54. This constituency is located in Nagpur district. The delimitation of the constituency happened in 2008. It comprises part of Nagpur Taluka and Ward No. 6 to 8, 28 to 36, and 67 to 72 of Nagpur Municipal Corporation.

== Members of the Legislative Assembly ==
Year	Member	Party
1967	Y. R. Deogade	Indian National Congress
1972	Narendra Deoghare	Indian National Congress
1978	Banwarilal Purohit	Indian National Congress (I)
1980	Satish Chaturvedi	Indian National Congress (I)
1985	Avinash Pande	Indian National Congress
1990	Satish Chaturvedi	Indian National Congress
1995	Satish Chaturvedi	Indian National Congress
1999	Satish Chaturvedi	Indian National Congress
2004	Satish Chaturvedi	Indian National Congress
2009	Krishna Khopde	Bharatiya Janata Party
2014	Krishna Khopde	Bharatiya Janata Party
2019	Krishna Khopde	Bharatiya Janata Party
2024	Krishna Khopde	Bharatiya Janata Party

== Election results ==
=== Assembly Election 2024 ===
2024 Maharashtra Legislative Assembly election : Nagpur East
Party	Candidate	Votes	%	±%
BJP	Krishna Pancham Khopde	163,390	65.75%	▲12.47
NCP-SP	Duneshwar Suryabhan Pethe	48,102	19.36%	New
Independent	Hajare Purushottam Nagorao	11,359	4.57%	New
Independent	Abha Bijju Pande	9,402	3.78%	New
BSP	Mukesh Madhukar Meshram	4,299	1.73%	▼0.98
VBA	Ganesh Ishwarji Harkande	2,795	1.12%	▼1.10
Bharatiya Yuva Jan Ekta Party	Chandan Sheshrao Bagde	2,647	1.07%	New
NOTA	None of the Above	2,005	0.81%	▼0.97
Margin of victory		115,288	46.40%	▲34.09
Turnout		250,490	59.77%	▲6.82
Total valid votes		248,485		
Registered electors		419,061		▲12.66
BJP hold		Swing	▲12.47	

=== Assembly Election 2019 ===
2019 Maharashtra Legislative Assembly election : Nagpur East
Party	Candidate	Votes	%	±%
BJP	Krishna Pancham Khopde	103,992	53.28%	▼0.76
INC	Purushottam Nagorao Hajare	79,975	40.97%	▲13.44
BSP	Sagar Damodhar Lokhande	5,284	2.71%	▼3.92
VBA	Mangalmurti Ramkrishna Sonkusare	4,338	2.22%	New
NOTA	None of the Above	3,460	1.77%	▲1.20
Margin of victory		24,017	12.30%	▼14.19
Turnout		198,678	53.41%	▼3.56
Total valid votes		195,181		
Registered electors		371,967		▲13.61
BJP hold		Swing	▼0.76	

=== Assembly Election 2014 ===
2014 Maharashtra Legislative Assembly election : Nagpur East
Party	Candidate	Votes	%	±%
BJP	Krishna Pancham Khopde	99,136	54.04%	▼1.12
INC	Abhijit Govindrao Wanjari	50,522	27.54%	▼5.74
BSP	Dilip Rangari	12,164	6.63%	▲3.37
NCP	Duneshwar Surybhanji Pethe	8,061	4.39%	New
SS	Dalal Ajay Anant	7,481	4.08%	New
Independent	Rajesh Bapuraoji Kakde	1,334	0.73%	New
NOTA	None of the Above	1,051	0.57%	New
Margin of victory		48,614	26.50%	▲4.63
Turnout		184,701	56.41%	▼0.87
Total valid votes		183,461		
Registered electors		327,400		▲15.69
BJP hold		Swing	▼1.12	

=== Assembly Election 2009 ===
2009 Maharashtra Legislative Assembly election : Nagpur East
Party	Candidate	Votes	%	±%
BJP	Krishna Pancham Khopde	88,814	55.15%	New
INC	Satish Jhaulal Chaturvedi	53,598	33.28%	▼13.19
BSP	G.M.Khan	5,252	3.26%	▼6.53
MNS	Moreshwar/Mama Gulabrao Dhote	3,196	1.98%	New
SP	Anil Ravishankar Pande	1,835	1.14%	New
Independent	Buddhinath Alias Bapu Pralhad Shamkuwar	1,641	1.02%	New
BBM	Meshram Devendra Jaygopal	1,566	0.97%	New
Margin of victory		35,216	21.87%	▲16.16
Turnout		161,105	56.93%	▲3.04
Total valid votes		161,036		
Registered electors		283,000		▼26.40
BJP gain from INC		Swing	▲8.68	

=== Assembly Election 2004 ===
2004 Maharashtra Legislative Assembly election : Nagpur East
Party	Candidate	Votes	%	±%
INC	Satish Jhaulal Chaturvedi	96,246	46.47%	▲3.90
SS	Shekhar Jayram Sawarbandhe	84,415	40.76%	▲4.33
BSP	Ashok Nagarmal Goyal	20,272	9.79%	▲8.78
Independent	Abdul Karim Patel (Shakilbhai)	1,695	0.82%	New
Independent	Mohammed Aslam Mohammed Ismail	1,659	0.80%	New
Margin of victory		11,831	5.71%	▼0.43
Turnout		207,123	53.87%	▲1.35
Total valid votes		207,112		
Registered electors		384,487		▲16.76
INC hold		Swing	▲3.90	

=== Assembly Election 1999 ===
1999 Maharashtra Legislative Assembly election : Nagpur East
Party	Candidate	Votes	%	±%
INC	Satish Jhaulal Chaturvedi	73,604	42.57%	▲9.68
SS	Pravin Shriniwas Barade	62,990	36.43%	▲13.56
JD(S)	Anil Madhorao Dhawade	23,073	13.34%	New
Independent	Shekhar Jairam Sawarbandhe	10,894	6.30%	New
BSP	Raut Bhaiyaji Govindrao	1,747	1.01%	New
Margin of victory		10,614	6.14%	▲4.56
Turnout		177,913	54.03%	▼14.90
Total valid votes		172,919		
Registered electors		329,290		▲5.40
INC hold		Swing	▲9.68	

=== Assembly Election 1995 ===
1995 Maharashtra Legislative Assembly election : Nagpur East
Party	Candidate	Votes	%	±%
INC	Satish Jhaulal Chaturvedi	69,249	32.88%	▼27.46
JD	Prabhakar Kashinath Dhawade	65,919	31.30%	New
SS	Pravin Shriniwas Barade	48,166	22.87%	▼8.27
Independent	Ashok Jarman	8,473	4.02%	New
INL	Ahmad Shabbir Vidrohi	3,592	1.71%	New
SP	Keshavrao Shende	2,283	1.08%	New
Independent	Dharmapal Natthuji Meshram	2,168	1.03%	New
Margin of victory		3,330	1.58%	▼27.61
Turnout		214,203	68.57%	▲17.36
Total valid votes		210,603		
Registered electors		312,405		▲17.45
INC hold		Swing	▼27.46	

=== Assembly Election 1990 ===
1990 Maharashtra Legislative Assembly election : Nagpur East
Party	Candidate	Votes	%	±%
INC	Satish Jhaulal Chaturvedi	80,333	60.34%	▲16.19
SS	Dnyanesh Wakudkar	41,462	31.14%	New
RPI(K)	Sayed Mubashshir Ali Sayed Usman Ali	6,579	4.94%	New
Margin of victory		38,871	29.20%	▲15.65
Turnout		134,269	50.48%	▼9.70
Total valid votes		133,142		
Registered electors		265,998		▲39.35
INC hold		Swing	▲16.19	

=== Assembly Election 1985 ===
1985 Maharashtra Legislative Assembly election : Nagpur East
Party	Candidate	Votes	%	±%
INC	Avinash Pandey	50,350	44.15%	New
Independent	Satish Jhaulal Chaturvedi	34,901	30.60%	New
BJP	Balwantrao Ganpatrao Dhobale	24,180	21.20%	▼17.17
RPI	Shivshankar Suryabhan Bankar	3,347	2.93%	New
Margin of victory		15,449	13.55%	▲0.15
Turnout		115,320	60.41%	▲7.45
Total valid votes		114,054		
Registered electors		190,889		▲33.81
INC gain from INC(I)		Swing	▼7.63	

=== Assembly Election 1980 ===
1980 Maharashtra Legislative Assembly election : Nagpur East
Party	Candidate	Votes	%	±%
INC(I)	Satish Jhaulal Chaturvedi	38,625	51.77%	▼12.06
BJP	Balwantro Ganpatrao Dhobale	28,629	38.37%	New
INC(U)	Ashok Dadasaheb Ahirrao	4,892	6.56%	New
Independent	Bhanudas Shamrao Pakhidde	1,099	1.47%	New
Independent	Gadekar Keshaorao Ramchandra	585	0.78%	New
Margin of victory		9,996	13.40%	▼36.91
Turnout		75,393	52.85%	▼16.70
Total valid votes		74,607		
Registered electors		142,661		▲10.71
INC(I) hold		Swing	▼12.06	

=== Assembly Election 1978 ===
1978 Maharashtra Legislative Assembly election : Nagpur East
Party	Candidate	Votes	%	±%
INC(I)	Banwarilal Purohit	56,752	63.83%	New
Independent	Prabhakar Natthu Lende	12,023	13.52%	New
JP	Umashankar Sarwajit Pathak	11,117	12.50%	New
INC	Babanrao Ganpatrao Naik	5,236	5.89%	▼34.15
Independent	Ratansingh Lalsingh Adiwan	1,252	1.41%	New
Independent	Chawaghawe Gendalal Vithalrao	1,245	1.40%	New
Margin of victory		44,729	50.31%	▲43.64
Turnout		90,608	70.32%	▲7.69
Total valid votes		88,906		
Registered electors		128,859		▲17.38
INC(I) gain from INC		Swing	▲23.80	

=== Assembly Election 1972 ===
1972 Maharashtra Legislative Assembly election : Nagpur East
Party	Candidate	Votes	%	±%
INC	Narendra Ramchandra Deoghare	26,944	40.04%	▼7.43
AIFB	Ram Hedaoo	22,452	33.36%	New
ABJS	Ramjiwan F. Chaudhary	14,069	20.91%	▼1.89
SSP	Ramrao Waghule	2,234	3.32%	New
Margin of victory		4,492	6.67%	▼17.99
Turnout		68,450	62.35%	▼3.06
Total valid votes		67,299		
Registered electors		109,783		▲11.40
INC hold		Swing	▼7.43	

=== Assembly Election 1967 ===
1967 Maharashtra Legislative Assembly election : Nagpur East
Party	Candidate	Votes	%	±%
INC	Y. R. Deogade	30,108	47.46%	New
ABJS	Ramjiwan F. Chaudhary	14,463	22.80%	New
Independent	D. D. Hedau	13,413	21.14%	New
Independent	B. K. Takkamore	2,332	3.68%	New
PWPI	B. T. Bhosale	1,431	2.26%	New
Margin of victory		15,645	24.66%	
Turnout		66,545	67.52%	
Total valid votes		63,434		
Registered electors		98,551		
INC win (new seat)				
