= N. K. P. Salve =

Indian politician

President of BCCI
- In office 1982–1985
- Preceded by: S. K. Wankhede
- Succeeded by: S. Sriraman

Minister of Power
- In office 1993–1996
- Prime Minister: P. V. Narasimha Rao
- Preceded by: Kalyan Singh Kalvi
- Succeeded by: H. D. Deve Gowda

Personal details
- Born: Narendra Kumar Salve; 18 March 1921 Chhindwara, Madhya Pradesh, India
- Died: 1 April 2012 (aged 91) Delhi, India
- Party: Indian National Congress
- Children: Harish Salve and Arundhati Upadhyaya
- Profession: Chartered Accountant, politician, cricket administrator

Narendra Kumar Prasadrao Salve (18 March 1921 – 1 April 2012) was a veteran Indian politician from Indian National Congress, parliamentarian and a cricket administrator. Former Union minister and president of Board of Control for Cricket in India (BCCI) (1982–1985), he was instrumental in bringing the Cricket World Cup outside England and to the Indian subcontinent in 1987. Salve was a staunch advocate for the separate statehood of Vidarbha.

In 1998, the BCCI named a cricket tournament in his honour, which annually held in India.

== Early life and education ==
N. K. P. Salve was born in Chhindwara, Madhya Pradesh, on 18 March 1921 to Marathi Christians parents Prasadrao Keshavrao Salve and Cornelia Karuna Jadhav. His father was a lawyer and freedom fighter from Ujjain and his Marathi mother was a renowned scholar, freedom fighter and the first woman in India to receive an honours degree in mathematics. Salve's grandfather Keshavrao Salve was a descendant of Shalivahanan dynasty. His sister Shri Mataji Nirmala Srivastava was the founder and guru[1] of Sahaja Yoga, a new religious movement.

Salve received B.Com. and F.C.A. degrees. He was a Chartered Accountant and was also an avid cricketer at college.

== Career and cricket administration ==
A chartered accountant by profession, Salve played club cricket in Nagpur in his early years, and became an umpire in the following years. He was elected the President of Vidarbha Cricket Association (VCA) (1972–1980), and in 1982 was elected as the president of Board of Control for Cricket in India (BCCI), a post he held until 1985. During his tenure, India won the 1983 Cricket World Cup, the BCCI won the joint hosting right for the 1987 Cricket World Cup for India and Pakistan. In 1983, he also became the first elected chairman of the Asian Cricket Council. In recognition to services to cricket, the BCCI started the NKP Salve Challenger Trophy in 1995.

== Rajya Sabha Election History ==
Position	Party	Constituency	From	To	Tenure
Member of Parliament, Rajya Sabha (1st Term)	INC(I)	Maharashtra	3 April 1978	2 April 1984	5 years, 365 days
Member of Parliament, Rajya Sabha (2nd Term)	INC(I)	Maharashtra	3 April 1984	2 April 1990	5 years, 364 days
Member of Parliament, Rajya Sabha (3rd Term)	INC(I)	Maharashtra	3 April 1990	2 April 1996	5 years, 365 days
Member of Parliament, Rajya Sabha (4th Term)	INC(I)	Maharashtra	3 April 1996	2 April 2002	5 years, 364 days

== Political career ==
Salve was elected a member of the Lok Sabha (1967–1977) from Betul (Lok Sabha constituency) and appointed to the Rajya Sabha from Maharashtra state for four consecutive terms, from 1978 to 2002. He was the chairman of the Privileges Committee of the Lok Sabha from 1975 to 1977.

He left his accountancy practice when he first appointed a Union cabinet minister in 1982, by Prime Minister Indira Gandhi. He was appointed the Union Minister of State by Prime Ministers, Rajiv Gandhi and P. V. Narasimha Rao, and also served at the Ministry of Information and Broadcasting, Steel and Mines, Parliamentary Affairs and Power. He was the chairman of the 9th Finance Commission of India (1984–89).

In 2003, along with former central cabinet minister Vasant Sathe, returned to Nagpur and formed the Vidarbha Rajya Nirman Congress to push the demand for a separate Vidarbha state.

== Death ==
Salve died at a private hospital in New Delhi on 1 April 2012, following a brief illness. His body was flown into his native Nagpur, where he was given a state funeral, before being buried at a local Christian cemetery, the following day.

== Personal life ==
His son, lawyer Harish Salve served as the Solicitor General of India from 1999 to 2002, while his daughter is Arundhati. His wife died a few years prior to him.

== See also ==
- NKP Salve Challenger Trophy
