= Sudhakar Kohale =

Indian politician

Member of Maharashtra Legislative Assembly
- In office 2014–2019
- Preceded by: Dinanath Padole
- Succeeded by: Mohan Mate
- Constituency: Nagpur South

President of Bharatiya Janata Party – Nagpur City
- In office 16 January 2016 – 23 June 2019
- President: Raosaheb Danve
- Preceded by: Krishna Khopde
- Succeeded by: Pravin Datke

Personal details
- Born: 1 July 1969 (age 57) Nagpur, Maharashtra, India
- Party: Bharatiya Janata Party
- Spouse: Vaishali Kohale
- Children: 2 sons
- Parent: Vithalrao Kohale (father)
- Profession: Teacher, Politician

Sudhakar Vitthalrao Kohale (born 1 July 1969) was a member of the 13th Maharashtra Legislative Assembly, from 2014 to 2019, representing the Nagpur South Assembly Constituency. He belongs to the Bharatiya Janata Party

Kohale was a corporator in the Nagpur Municipal Corporation (NMC) at the time of election, he then represented the Mhalgi Nagar ward. Kohale defeated sitting MLA Dinanath Padole, of the Nationalist Congress Party and former minister Satish Chaturvedi of the Indian National Congress. Fifteen opponents including Padole lost their deposit. This victory has been described as one busting caste and religious vote bank politics, and a mandate for development. Kohale was chairman of NMC's Water Works Committee.

== Early life ==
Mr. Kohale was a teacher in Navyug Vidyalaya, Mahal, Nagpur.

Child Hood : Mr. Sudhakar Kohale ( MLA & Nagpur City President) has faced many up and downs in his life . In his college days, he used to sell milk from door to door, on his bicycle. After that, he attended college.

== Political career ==
MLA South Nagpur since 2014. He is currently General Secretary Nagpur BJPCity Unit.

=== Positions held ===
==== Within BJP ====
  - President, Nagpur Mahanagar BJP
- General Secretary, NagpurBJP

==== Legislative ====
- Corporator, Nagpur Municipal Corporation
- Member, Maharashtra Legislative Assembly 2014
