= Vilas Muttemwar =

Indian politician

Vilasrao Muttemwar
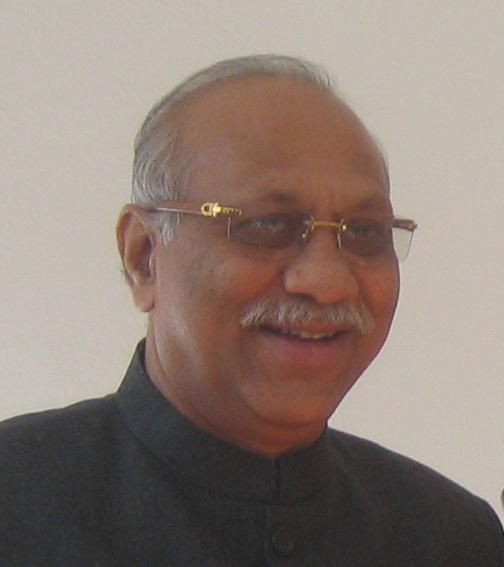

Minister of State (Independent Charge) of Non-Conventional Energy Sources
- In office 23 May 2004 – 22 May 2009
- President: A. P. J. Abdul Kalam; Pratibha Patil
- Prime Minister: Manmohan Singh
- Preceded by: Kariya Munda
- Succeeded by: Farooq Abdullah

Minister of State of Rural Development (Rural Areas and Employment) and Parliamentary Affairs
- In office 15 September 1995 – 16 May 1996
- President: Shankar Dayal Sharma
- Prime Minister: P. V. Narasimha Rao

Member of Parliament, Lok Sabha
- In office 10 March 1998 – 16 May 2014
- Succeeded by: Nitin Gadkari
- Constituency: Nagpur

Personal details
- Born: 22 March 1949 (age 77) Sindewahi, Bombay Province, India
- Party: Indian National Congress

Vilas Bhaurao Muttemwar (born 22 March 1949) is an Indian politician from Maharashtra belonging to the Indian National Congress who served as a member of the 7th, 8th, 10th, 12th, 13th, 14th and 15th Lok Sabha representing the Nagpur Lok Sabha constituency.

He served as the Minister of State in the Department of Rural Areas and Employment, Ministry of Rural Development and Minister of State in the Ministry of Parliamentary Affairs under Prime Minister P. V. Narasimha Rao between 1995 and 1996 and as Minister of State (Independent Charge) in the Ministry of Non-Conventional Energy Sources under Prime Minister Manmohan Singh from 23 May 2004 till 22 May 2009.

== Political career ==
Vilas Muttemwar was elected as a member of the 7th Lok Sabha from the Nagpur Lok Sabha constituency on Indian National Congress ticket in 1980. He served as a Secretary of the Indian Youth Congress between 1980 and 1981. In the 1984 general election, he was re-elected to office. During this period, he also served as Joint Secretary of the Indian National Congress from 1985 till 1988.

In the 1991 general election to the 10th Lok Sabha, he was re-elected from Nagpur constituency. He served as the Secretary of the Congress Parliamentary Party from 1991 till 1995. He also served as the Chairman of the Committee on Public Undertakings between 1993 and 1995. He was appointed a minister of state in the Rao ministry in 1995 and was assigned the portfolios as Minister of State in the Department of Rural Areas and Employment of the Ministry of Rural Development and in the Ministry of Parliamentary Affairs and served till 1996.

He was elected to the 12th Lok Sabha in 1998 and subsequently to the 13th Lok Sabha in 1999, the 14th Lok Sabha in 2004 and the 15th Lok Sabha in 2009. During the 12th Lok Sabha, he served as a member of the Committee on Energy, Committee on Public Undertakings and the Committee on Private Members' Bill and Resolutions. In the 13th Lok Sabha, he was a member of the Standing Committee on Transport and Tourism, Consultative Committees of the Ministry of Railways and the Ministry of Finance. He also served as the Secretary of the Congress Parliamentary Party for a second term between 2003 and 2005.

Upon his re-election in 2004 and the victory of the Congress-led United Progressive Alliance to government, he was inducted to the union council of ministers of Prime Minister Manmohan Singh as Minister of State (Independent Charge) for Non-Conventional Energy Sources on 22 May 2004.

In the 15th Lok Sabha, he was the Chairman of the Committee on Food, Consumer Affairs and Public Distribution; and Member of the General Purposes Committee, India-Bangladesh Parliamentary Friendship Committee and the House Committee. He contested the 2014 election to the 16th Lok Sabha from Nagpur constituency against Bharatiya Janata Party-candidate Nitin Gadkari and was defeated by 2,84,848 votes.
