= Vinod Gudadhe Patil =

Indian politician

Member of Legislative Assembly, Maharashtra
- In office (1990-1995), (1995 – 1999)
- Preceded by: Gev Manchersha Avari
- Succeeded by: Devendra Fadnavis
- Constituency: Nagpur West

Personal details
- Born: Nagpur, Maharashtra, India
- Party: Bharatiya Janata Party
- Children: Prafulla Gudadhe-Patil
- Occupation: Politician

Vinod Gudadhe Patil is an Indian politician and was a member of the Bharatiya Janata Party. Gudadhe Patil was a member of the Maharashtra Legislative Assembly from the Nagpur West constituency in Nagpur district. He was minister Ministers of State in Narayan Rane ministry.
