= Mohan Mate =

Indian politician

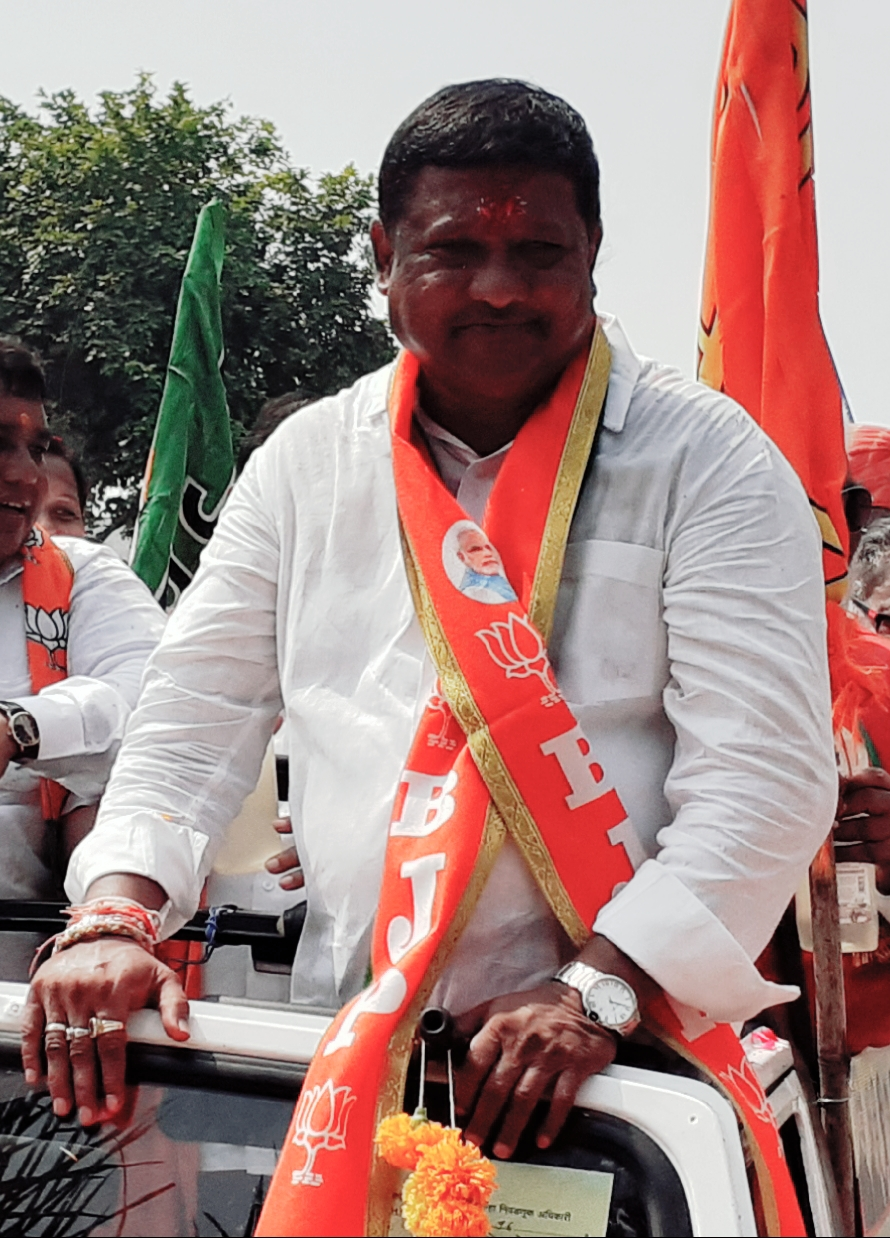

Member of the Maharashtra Legislative Assembly
- Incumbent
- Assumed office (1999–2004), (2019 - Incumbent)
- Preceded by: Ashok Ramchandra Wadibhasme
- Succeeded by: Govindrao Marotrao Wanjari
- Constituency: Nagpur South

Personal details
- Born: Maharashtra, India
- Party: Bharatiya Janata Party
- Occupation: Politician
- Website: mahabjp.org

Mohan Mate is an Indian politician and member of the Bharatiya Janata Party. Mate was a member of the Maharashtra Legislative Assembly from 1999 to 2004 and currently 2019 to 2024 representing the Nagpur South (Vidhan Sabha constituency).

He won 2019 Maharashtra Vidhan Sabha election from Nagpur South and got elected as MLA for the 2nd time. He again won the 2024 MLA elections, to serve his 3rd term as the MLA in the Maharashtra Vidhan Sabha.

He is considered a close aide of the Maharashtra Chief Minister Devendra Fadnavis.
