= Satish Chaturvedi =

Indian politician

Dr. Satish Chaturvedi
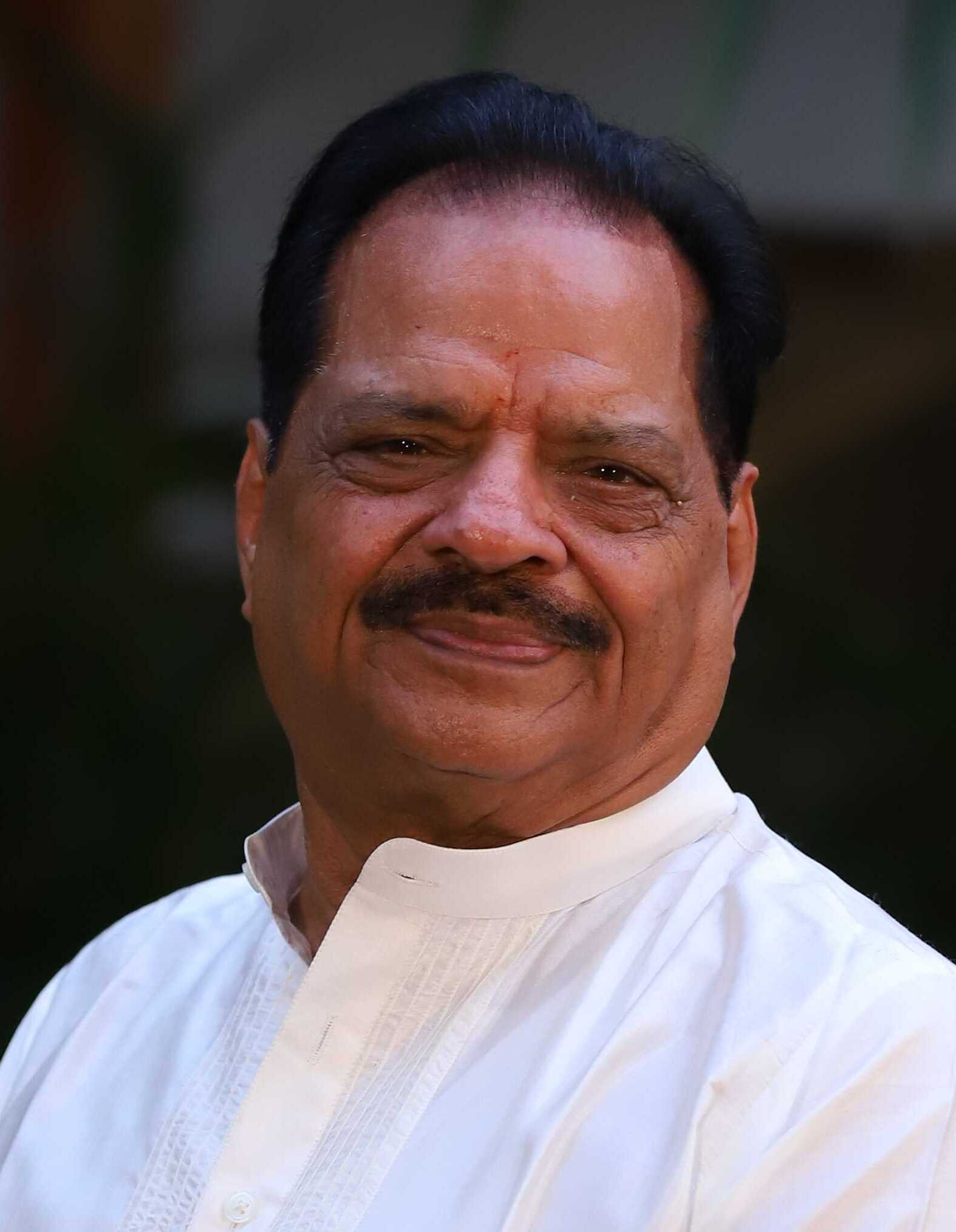

Member of the Maharashtra Legislative Assembly
- In office 1980–2009
- Preceded by: Banwarilal Purohit
- Succeeded by: Krishna Khopde
- Constituency: Nagpur East

Personal details
- Born: 10 October 1946 (age 80) Agra, Uttar Pradesh, India
- Party: Indian National Congress
- Children: Dushyant Chaturvedi (Son)
- Education: M.A., Ph.D., LLB

Satish Jhaulal Chaturvedi (born 10 October 1946) is an active Indian politician of the Maharashtra state. He has represented the Nagpur East Assembly constituency for 5 terms in the Maharashtra legislative assembly and he represents Indian National Congress.

== Early life and education ==
Dr. Chaturvedi is a Ph.D. scholar and has a doctorate in Literature. He has also done M.A. (Political Sciences), (History), (Hindi Literature). Apart from this, he also has an LL.B. degree.

He became active in politics during his college years as he became the president of Nagpur University Student Union in 1968. He came in contact with the student wing of the Indian National Congress, N.S.U.I. and got the charge of Maharashtra N.S.U.I. in 1969. In 1978, he became the Maharashtra Pradesh Youth Congress President.

From 1979 to '80, he was the general secretary of Maharashtra Pradesh Congress Committee and also handled the position of vice president, Maharashtra Pradesh Congress Committee. Along with this he was also the member of AICC delegates from Maharashtra for 15 years.

== Political career ==
MLA from Nagpur East legislative constituency for 25 years- 1980-85, 1990–95, 1995–99, 1999-2004, 2004-09.

He was the minister of state for forest, health, tourism, technical education, sports and irrigation in 1980.

He also held the Labour, Textiles and Mining ministry from 2001 to '04.

From 2004 to '08, he held the ministerial berth for Labour, Textiles, Ex-Servicemen Welfare, Employment and Self Employment.
