= Vidarbha Rajya Nirman Congress =

Vidarbha Rajya Nirman Congress is a political party in the Indian state of Maharashtra. VRNC works for statehood for the Vidarbha region.

VRNC was launched by two former Congress Party union ministers, Vasant Sathe and N. K. P. Salve, on 18 August 2003 and is also a member of the National Front for New States.

== See also ==
- Indian National Congress breakaway parties
