= Ramrao Krishnarao Patil =

Ramarao Patil ICS

Member of Planning Commission of India
- In office 1951–1956

District Magistrate in Central Provinces and Berar

Personal details
- Born: Ramarao Krishnarao Patil; 13 December 1907
- Died: 1 June 2007 (aged 99) Nagpur, Maharashtra, India
- Party: Indian National Congress
- Occupation: Freedom fighter, civil servant
- Known for: Cosigning the Nagpur Pact; Playing an important role in merging Vidarbha region to Maharashtra
- Awards: Jamnalal Bajaj Award (1997); Maharashtra Bhushan (posthumous) (2007)

Ramrao Krishnarao Patil ICS (13 December 1907 – 1 June 2007) was an Indian Gandhian and freedom fighter from India.

He was member of the elite Indian Civil Service and worked as district collector in the Central Provinces. He cosigned the Nagpur Pact.

He was member of the first Planning Commission set up by then Prime Minister Jawaharlal Nehru.

He was a recipient of the Jamnalal Bajaj Award in 1997 and was awarded Maharashtra Bhushan Award in 2007 posthumously.
