= Narendra Deoghare =

Indian politician (born 1922)

Narendra R. Deoghare

M P
- In office 1967–1971
- Constituency: Nagpur

Personal details
- Born: 2 May 1922 Nagpur, India
- Party: INC
- Children: 4 sons, 1 daughters
- Profession: Weaver
- As of 23 February, 2012

Narendra Ramchandra Deoghare (born 2 May 1922) was an Indian politician who served as a member of the 4th Lok Sabha from the Nagpur constituency of Maharashtra. He was a member of the Indian National Congress (INC) party.

Deoghare attended Govindram Seksaria College of Commerce at Wardha. He was married to Mrs. Shashilabai and had four sons and one daughter and resided at Bhandara Road in Nagpur.

Deoghare was previously associated with the Praja Socialist Party. He was Chairman of Nagpur Resham and Vinkar Cooperative Society during 1956—60 and Director of Vidarbha Weavers Cooperative Society from 1946 to 1958. He was member of All India Cottage Industries Board. He worked as Member of District Congress Committee, Nagpur Pradesh Congress Committee and All India Congress Committee between 1955 and 1957.
