= Devendra Fadnavis =

18th Chief Minister of Maharashtra (2014-2019; since 2024)

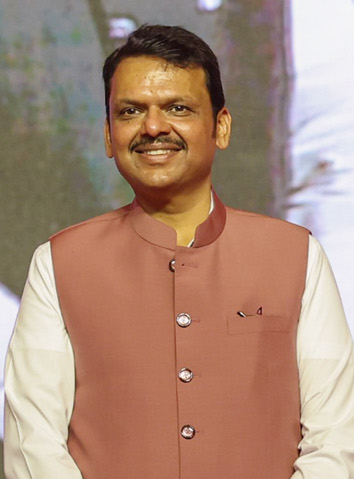
- Fadnavis in 2024

18th Chief Minister of Maharashtra
- Incumbent
- Assumed office 5 December 2024
- Governor: C. P. Radhakrishnan; Acharya Devvrat (additional charge); Jishnu Dev Varma
- Deputy: Ajit Pawar (until 2026); Eknath Shinde; Sunetra Pawar (since 2026)
- Cabinet: Fadnavis III
- Departments: Home Affairs; Finance; Planning; Energy; Law & Judiciary; General Administration; Information & Public Relations
- Preceded by: Eknath Shinde
- In office 23 November 2019 – 28 November 2019
- Governor: Bhagat Singh Koshyari
- Deputy: Ajit Pawar
- Cabinet: Fadnavis II
- Preceded by: President's rule
- Succeeded by: Uddhav Thackeray
- In office 31 October 2014 – 12 November 2019
- Governor: C. Vidyasagar Rao; Bhagat Singh Koshyari
- Cabinet: Fadnavis I
- Departments: Home Affairs; General Administration; Law & Judiciary; Urban Development; Ports Development; Information Technology; Information & Public Relations
- Preceded by: Prithviraj Chavan
- Succeeded by: President's rule

9th Deputy Chief Minister of Maharashtra
- In office 30 June 2022 – 26 November 2024 Serving with Ajit Pawar (from 3 July 2023)
- Chief Minister: Eknath Shinde
- Departments: Home Affairs; Law & Judiciary; Water Resources; Energy
- Preceded by: Ajit Pawar
- Succeeded by: Eknath Shinde

22nd Leader of the Opposition in Maharashtra Legislative Assembly
- In office 1 December 2019 – 29 June 2022
- Chief Minister: Uddhav Thackeray
- Preceded by: Vijay Wadettiwar
- Succeeded by: Ajit Pawar

President of Bharatiya Janata Party, Maharashtra
- In office 11 April 2013 – 6 January 2015
- Preceded by: Sudhir Mungantiwar
- Succeeded by: Raosaheb Danve

Member of Maharashtra Legislative Assembly
- Incumbent
- Assumed office 22 October 2009
- Preceded by: Constituency established
- Constituency: Nagpur South-West
- In office 6 October 1999 – 22 October 2009
- Preceded by: Vinod Gudadhe Patil
- Succeeded by: Sudhakar Deshmukh
- Constituency: Nagpur West

Mayor of Nagpur
- In office 5 March 1997 – 4 February 1999
- Preceded by: Kundatai Vijaykar
- Succeeded by: Kalpana Pande
- Constituency: Ram Nagar ward

Personal details
- Born: Devendra Gangadharrao Fadnavis; 22 July 1970 (age 56) Nagpur, Maharashtra, India
- Party: Bharatiya Janata Party
- Spouse: Amruta Fadnavis (m. 2005)
- Children: 1
- Education: (LLB) Nagpur University, (MBM) Free University of Berlin
- Occupation: Politician
- Website: www.devendrafadnavis.in
- Nickname: Deva Bhau
- Organisational positions: Bharatiya Janata Party; Ward President, BJYM (1989); Office Bearer, Nagpur (west) BJP (1990); Nagpur President, BJYM (1992); State Vice-president, BJYM (1994); National Vice-president, BJYM (2001); General Secretary, BJP, Maharashtra (2010); President, BJP Maharashtra (2013); In Charge, BJP Goa (2022); Other organisations; Organisational President, Rambhau Mhalgi Prabodhini (2021); Chairman, NITI Aayog's High Power Committee of Chief Ministers on Transformation of Agriculture in India (2019)

Devendra Sarita Gangadharrao Fadnavis (born 22 July 1970) is an Indian politician who is currently serving his third term as the 18th Chief Minister of Maharashtra since 5 December 2024. He previously served as the Deputy Chief Minister of Maharashtra, alongside Ajit Pawar (from 2023) in the Eknath Shinde government from 2022 to 2024. From 2019 to 2022, he also served as the Leader of the Opposition in the Maharashtra Legislative Assembly. He became Chief Minister at the age of 44, making him the second-youngest in Maharashtra's history after Sharad Pawar.

During the 2019 Maharashtra political crisis, Fadnavis held a second term as Chief Minister for 5 days before resigning on 28 November 2019. He has been a member of the Bharatiya Janata Party (BJP) and the Rashtriya Swayamsevak Sangh (RSS). He has served as the President of BJP's Maharashtra state unit from 2013 to 2015. He has represented the Nagpur South West constituency in the Maharashtra Legislative Assembly since 2009, having previously served Nagpur West from 1999 to 2009. He was also the Mayor of Nagpur from 1997 to 1999.

== Life and education ==
Devendra Gangadharrao Fadnavis was born on 22 July 1970 in Nagpur, Maharashtra in a Marathi Deshastha Brahmin to Gangadhar and Sarita Fadnavis. His father was a member of the Maharashtra Legislative Council from Nagpur. His mother belonged to the Kaloti family of Amravati and had previously served as a director of the Vidarbha Housing Credit Society.

Fadnavis did his initial schooling at the Indira Convent School in Nagpur. During the 1975 Emergency, Fadnavis's father, being a member of the Jan Sangh, was imprisoned for participating in anti-government protests. Fadnavis subsequently refused to continue his schooling at Indira Convent, as he did not want to attend a school named after Indira Gandhi, the Prime Minister he held responsible for imprisoning his father. He was then transferred to the Saraswati Vidyalaya School, Nagpur, where he received most of his schooling. Later, Fadnavis attended Dharampeth Junior College.

Fadnavis completed his Bachelor of Laws undergraduate degree from Dr. Babasaheb Ambedkar College of Law, Nagpur University in 1992. He completed his postgraduate degree in Business Management and a diploma in Project Management from DSE, Berlin, Germany.

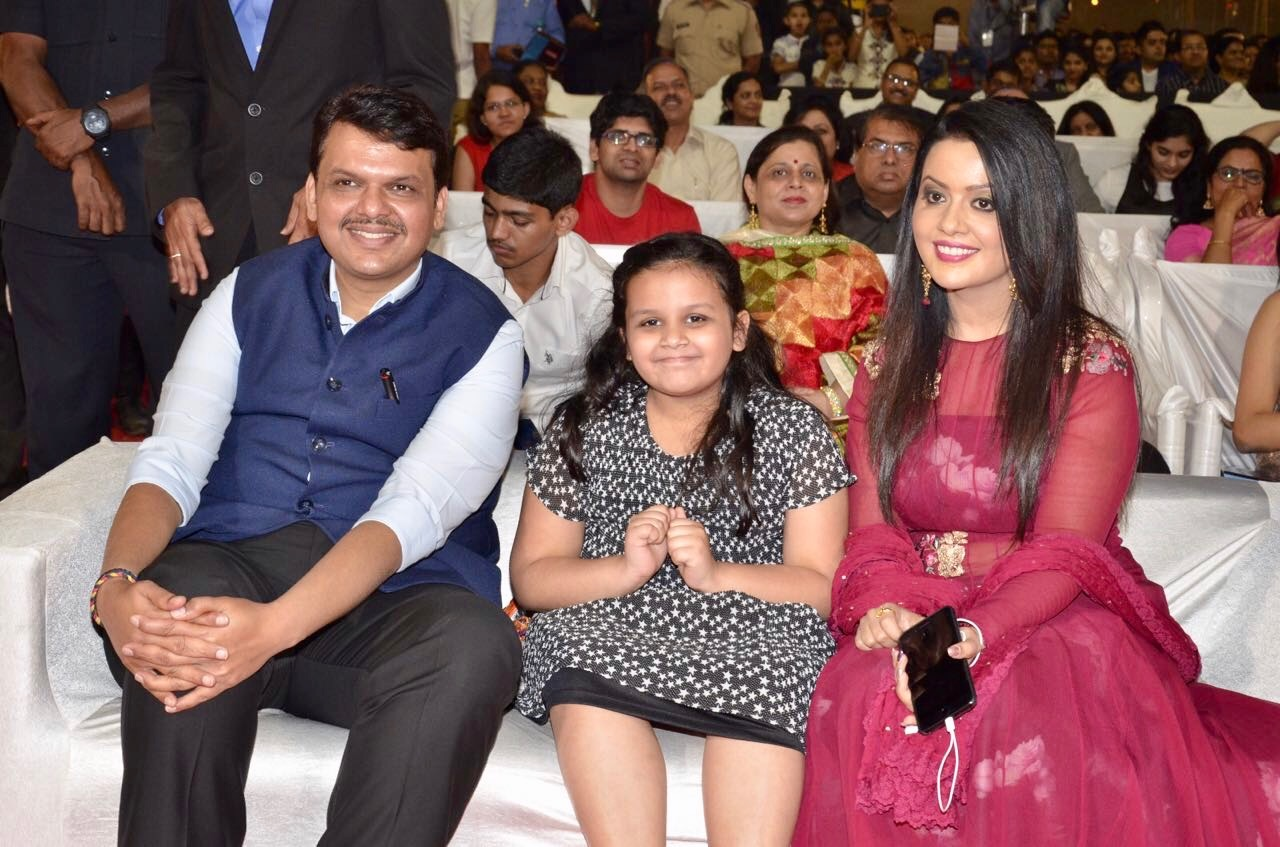
Fadnavis with daughter Divija and wife Amruta

Fadnavis practices Hinduism. He married Amruta Sharad Ranade, an actress, singer and banker, in 2005. Both of them met at a marriage ceremony of a common friend. After two years of marriage, the couple had a daughter, Divija Fadnavis, in 2007.

== Early political career (1989–2014) ==
Many of Fadnavis's family members have been involved in electoral politics. Both his father, Gangadhar Rao Fadnavis, and aunt, Sobha Fadnavis, were members of the Bharatiya Janata Party and served in the state legislature. Fadnavis joined the RSS-affiliated Akhil Bharatiya Vidyarthi Parishad (ABVP) in 1989. Later in the year 1992, he became a Councillor, representing the Ram Nagar Ward in the Nagpur Municipal Corporation. In 1997, at the age of 27, Fadnavis became the youngest mayor of Nagpur and the second-youngest mayor in the history of India. He took the decision to double property tax in Nagpur, raising 35 crore rupees for the municipal corporation. He remained as a Mayor until 1999, and later held a position in the newly created Mayor in Council from 1999 to 2001, after the system was introduced by the Maharashtra government in 1998.

Fadnavis was elected to the Maharashtra Legislative Assembly in the 1999 elections after he won in the Nagpur West constituency. In the 2004 elections, he was re-elected to the assembly from the same constituency. Later in the 2009 elections, he contested from the newly created Nagpur South West constituency.

Fadnavis took over as the president of the Maharashtra unit of the BJP in 2013. His appointment to this position has been credited to his closeness with the RSS. According to political commentators, the party appointed him based on advice of the RSS. Fadnavis being one of the youngest BJP state presidents, his appointment was also seen as an attempt by the party to attract youth voters. His appointment was made when tensions between the then deputy Leader of Opposition in Lok Sabha Gopinath Munde and the former BJP national president Nitin Gadkari were high. His appointment to the position was seen as a mutual compromise by Gopinath Munde-led and Nitin Gadkari-led factions within the state unit of the party.

During his term as the party president, he criticised the Congress and NCP government for their alleged irrigation scam. He used the issue heavily in successive election campaigns for the Lok Sabha election and the State legislative assembly election.

== First term as chief minister of Maharashtra (2014–2019) ==
=== Background and government formation ===
In the run up to the 2014 legislative elections, the BJP and the Shiv Sena severed their ties, and contested the elections separately. The fracture in the alliance resulted from disputes over the chief ministerial candidate of the alliance and the number of constituencies that each parties will contest. After the elections, the BJP became the single largest party, while the Shiv Sena became the second largest party.

Fadnavis took over as the legislative party leader of the BJP in the state after winning a vote by the newly elected MLAs of the party. Fadnavis was appointed as the Chief Minister of Maharashtra on 31 October 2014. BJP formed a minority government initially with confidence and supply from the Sharad Pawar-led Nationalist Congress Party. The erstwhile alliance partner Shiv Sena chose to stay in opposition, with its legislative party leader Eknath Shinde briefly serving as the leader of the opposition. However, soon after, the Shiv Sena joined the Fadnavis-led government, giving the government a majority. Fadnavis completed his first term for the complete five years, making him only the second person in the state to do so, the other being Vasantrao Naik.

=== Infrastructure Projects ===
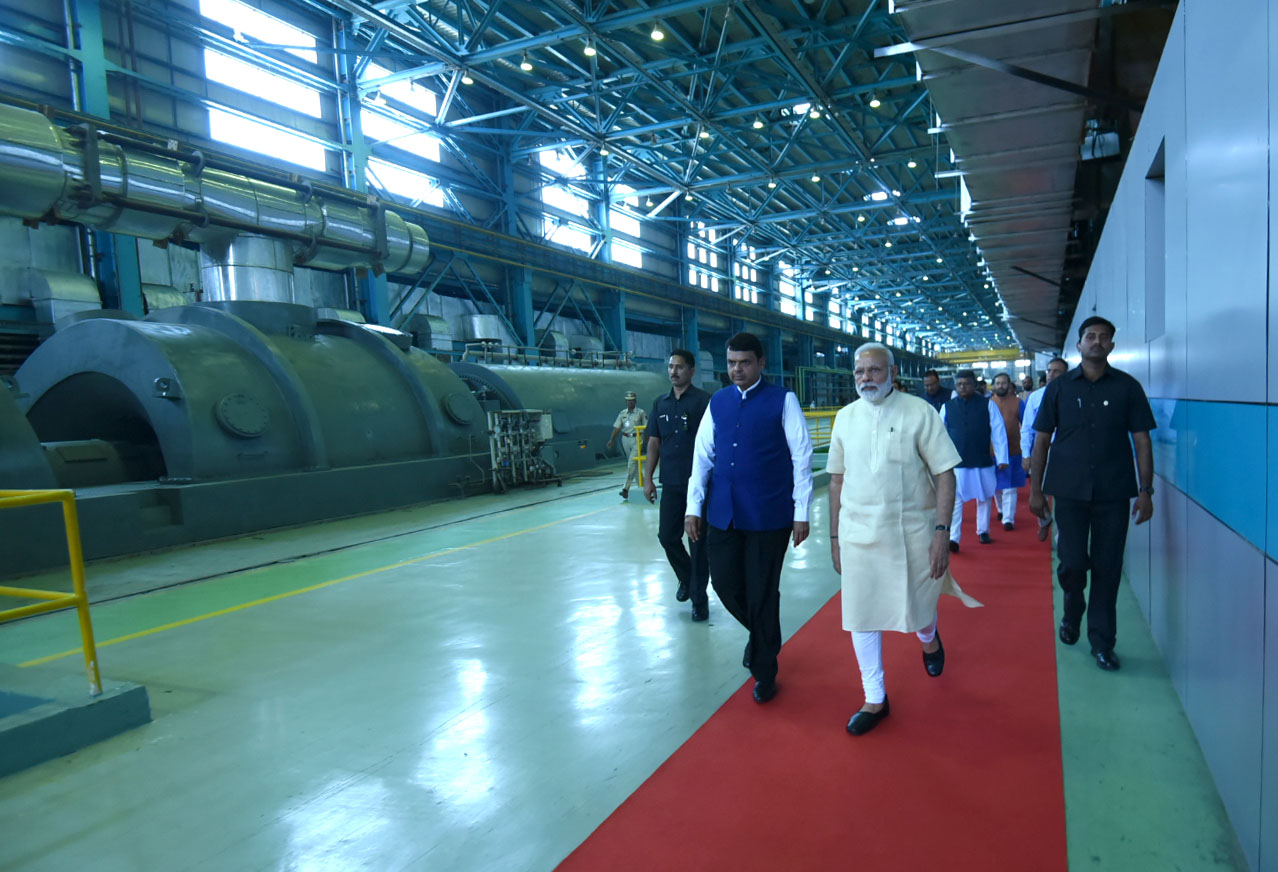
Fadnavis along with prime minister Narendra Modi visiting Koradi Thermal Power Station

During his first term as the chief minister of Maharashtra, Fadnavis oversaw critical infrastructure projects such as the conceptualisation of the Mumbai–Nagpur Expressway, the Mumbai and Pune Metro expansions, the Coastal Road project, and the Mumbai Trans Harbour Link (MTHL). He also established a dedicated "War Room" to monitor all the major infrastructure projects in order to address the bottlenecks and ensuring timely completion. In 2019, the government initiated a scheme to set up a water grid project in Marathwada to address the drought situation. The project included a plan for water grid from Israeli partners.

=== Social policies and issues ===
The Bombay High Court stayed the reservation decision on the Maratha Reservation Act in 2015. Following this, Fadnavis constituted the Backward Class Commission in 2015, as directed by the High Court to confirm that the Marathas constitute as a backward community.

== 2019 political crisis ==
=== 2019 election and BJP – Shiv Sena breakup ===
In the 2019 legislative assembly election, the Mahayuti alliance, comprising BJP, Shiv Sena, and other regional parties, contested together. During the campaigns, a chief ministerial candidate from the alliance was not projected. Many Shiv Sena politicians even claimed that the next chief minister will be from their party.

After the elections, the Mahayuti secured a majority, with the BJP becoming the single largest party again. During the talks of government formation, disagreements surfaced between BJP and Shiv Sea regarding the chief minister position. Shiv Sena, led by Uddhav Thackeray, demanded that the chief ministership should be shared between the parties in a rotation government arrangement. Politicians from Shiv Sena claimed that decision was made between the top leadership of the two parties where candidates from both the parties will occupy the position of chief minister for 2.5 years each. However, this claim was disputed by Fadnavis, and he said that no such promises have been made and he would become the chief minister for 5 years. After successive meetings, no consensus was reached, and the alliance between the parties broke. On 8 November 2019, Fadnavis resigned as the chief minister.

Following this, the then Maharashtra Governor Bhagat Singh Koshyari invited the major parties, including BJP, Shiv Sena, and NCP, to form government. However, due to no consensus being reached, president's rule was imposed in the state on the recommendation of the governor.

=== Second term as Chief Minister (2019) ===
On 23 November 2019, Fadnavis reached the residence of Governor Koshyar with the NCP leader Ajit Pawar to form their government. Fadnavis was sworn in as the Chief minister, while Pawar was sworn in as the Deputy Chief Minister. However, soon later, NCP chief Sharad Pawar announced that Ajit Pawar's decision to support the BJP was his own and not endorsed by the party. Shiv Sena, NCP, and INC took up this issue in the Supreme Court of India. On 26 November 2019, The court ordered the new government to prove their majority with a Floor test in the legislative assembly. Due to lack of adequate support, on the very same day, Fadnavis and Ajit Pawar resigned from their posts of Chief Minister and Deputy Chief Minister respectively.

During this short period, Fadnavis chaired a climate resilience meeting with representatives of the World Bank, restarted the Chief Minister's refund cell, and sanctioned ₹5380 crores in aid for farmers. The government lasted for about 80 hours. His second tenure was the shortest tenure for any chief minister of the state since its inception.

== Leader of opposition (2019–2022) and deputy chief minister of Maharashtra (2022−2024) ==
=== Leader of Opposition in Maharashtra Legislative Assembly (2019–2022) ===
After the second Fadnavis government collapsed, BJP became the main opposition party against the newly appointed MVA government led by Uddhav Thackeray. Being elected as the party leader of BJP in the Maharashtra Legislative Assembly, Fadnavis assumed the role of the Leader of the Opposition.

=== Role in 2022 Maharashtra political crisis ===
Fadnavis played a key role in the 2022 political crisis that led to the fall of Uddhav-led government and a virtual split in Shiv Sena. After a significant amount of Shiv Sena MLAs rebelled against the party leadership, Fadnavis and Union Home minister Amit Shah met the leader of the rebels Eknath Shinde in Vadodara, Gujarat to reportedly plan a merger coalition to topple the Uddhav led government. On 28 June 2022, Fadnavis met Governor of Maharashtra Bhagat Singh Koshyari and demanded a motion of no confidence against Uddhav Thackeray. Fadnavis himself has claimed that he caused the split within the party. On 29 June, Uddhav Thackeray resigned as the Chief Minister while speaking live on social media ahead of the no-confidence motion.

=== Deputy chief minister of Maharashtra (2022–2024) ===
The next day, on 30 June 2022, Fadnavis was sworn in as the ninth Deputy Chief Minister of Maharashtra, with Eknath Shinde as the chief minister. During this time, he held key ministries, including Home Affairs, Law and Judiciary, Water Resources, Command Area Development, Energy, New and Renewable Energy, and Protocol. Initially, before the formation of the government, Fadnavis said in a press conference that he personally will not be a part of the new government, although BJP will join it. According to media reports, Fadnavis was reluctant to become the deputy chief minister. However, BJP national president J. P. Nadda directed Fadnavis to join the government.

Many political commentators have highlighted the position of deputy chief minister to be a downgrade or demotion for Fadnavis. Nevertheless, his role in the government was considered key by political commentators in keeping a check on the Shinde-led Shiv Sena by the top BJP leadership. Fadnavis become the fifth person to become a minister in a state government after serving as the chief minister.

== Third term as chief minister of Maharashtra (2024-present) ==
=== Background and government formation ===
After the 2024 legislative elections, BJP once again emerged as the single largest party, securing 132 seats, only short by 13 seats to form a majority government on its own. Other key allies like Shiv Sena and NCP also performed well. Fadnavis was appointed as the Chief Minister of the state for a third time on 5 December 2024, 12 days after the results were announced. Both Eknath Shinde and Ajit Pawar took oath as the deputy chief ministers.

=== Vote theft allegations ===
Following the 2024 legislative elections and the 2024 Indian general election, allegations of vote theft were levelled against BJP state governments. In August 2025, the Leader of the Opposition in Lok Sabha, Rahul Gandhi alleged voter manipulation in polls including Maharashtra. Fadnavis rejected those allegations. In October 2025, many regional leaders like NCP–SP chief Sharad Pawar, Shiv Sena chief Uddhav Thackeray, MNS chief Raj Thackeray, and INC leader Balasaheb Thorat met with the Chief Electoral Officer (India) in Maharashtra to submit their complaints urging action on voter irregularities. Fadnavis was also invited to be a part of the delegation through an open letter by Shiv Sena MP Sanjay Raut, but it was not acknowledged.

== Elections ==
=== Maharashtra Legislative Assembly ===
Year	Constituency	Party	Votes	%	Opponent	Opponent Party	Opponent Votes	%	Result	Margin	%
2024	Nagpur South West	BJP	129,401	56.88	Prafulla Gudadhe Patil	INC	89,691	39.43	Won	39,710	17.45
2019	Nagpur South West	BJP	109,238	56.86	Ashish Deshmukh	INC	59,893	31.18	Won	49,344	25.68
2014	Nagpur South West	BJP	113,918	59.21	Prafulla Gudadhe Patil	INC	54,976	28.57	Won	58,942	30.64
2009	Nagpur South West	BJP	89,258	51.02	Vikas Thakre	INC	61,483	35.14	Won	27,775	15.87
2004	Nagpur West	BJP	113,143	48.59	Ranjeet Deshmukh	INC	95,533	39.43	Won	39,710	17.45
1999	Nagpur West	BJP	94,853	48.66	Ashok Dhawad	INC	85,766	44.00	Won	9,087	4.66

== Awards and recognition ==
- Best Parliamentarian Award by Commonwealth Parliamentary Association (2002–03)
- Honorary Doctorate from Osaka City University, Japan (October 2015)
- Lee Kuan Yew Exchange Fellow, by Lee Kuan Yew School of Public Policy, Singapore (September 2017)
- Outstanding Leadership in Development Award from Georgetown University, United States (June 2018)
- Honorary Doctorate from Koyasan University, Japan (December 2023)

== Political positions ==
=== Bharat Mata slogans in 2016 ===
In April 2016, while addressing a rally in Nashik, Fadnavis said that, "Every Indian would have to chant 'Bharat Mata ki Jai' and those who refuse to chant the slogan should not live in the country and instead go to Pakistan or China." Critics pointed that this was an attempt at religious polarisation. Fadnavis later issued a clarification that this issue had nothing to do with religion.

=== Aurangzeb-related remarks in 2023 ===
In June 2023, following the clashes over social media posts glorifying Mughal emperor Aurangzeb in Kolhapur, Fadnavis remarked at a public rally that the sympathizers of Aurangzeb are "Aurangzeb Ki Aulad" Several political analysts have criticised Fadnavis's Aurangzeb Ki Aulad (literal translation "Aurangzeb's Children") remark noting that it constituted a dog whistle to target Muslims in his state. Several Hindu groups opposed the social media posts resulting in communal clashes. Fadnavis tried to clarify that he did not consider Indian Muslims as Aurangzeb's descendants and that nationalist Muslims do not see Aurangzeb as their hero.

== Legal issues and controversies ==
=== Non-disclosure of criminal cases in 2014 poll affidavit ===
In September 2023, a Nagpur court acquitted Fadnavis in a case pertaining to his election affidavit in 2014. A complaint over the non-disclosure of pending FIRs in criminal cases against Fadnavis had been filed by advocate Satish Uke. Uke's contention was that such suppression of information was a violation of the Representation of People's Act. Fadnavis admitted to the non-disclosure during the court proceedings and claimed that it was an inadvertent mistake by his lawyer.

== See also ==
- First Fadnavis ministry
- Second Fadnavis ministry
- Third Fadnavis ministry
- Make in Maharashtra
- Politics of Maharashtra

Political offices
Preceded by Eknath Shinde	Chief Minister of Maharashtra; 2024-present

Political offices
Preceded by Ajit Pawar	Deputy Chief Minister of Maharashtra; 2022–2024	Succeeded by Eknath Shinde
