= Vidarbha Janata Congress =

Political party of India

- Founder: Jambuwantrao Dhote
- Founded: 9 September 2002

Vidarbha Janata Congress (Vidarbha Peoples Congress) is a political party in the Indian state of Maharashtra. VJC was launched on 9 September 2002 by a former Member of Parliament Jambuwantrao Dhote. The party was formed to demand statehood for the Vidarbha region separate from Maharashtra.

The party's constitution, was released at Sewagram on 2 October, had a special provision which allowed politicians of all hues to join up without quitting their original parties. After its launch, the VJC held a public rally at Chitnavis Park on 23 January, and took a vow to fight for Vidarbha. A rathyatra was taken out in the region to "awaken" people, followed by a Nagpur-Delhi march.

== See also ==
- Indian National Congress breakaway parties
