= Vikas Thakre =

Indian politician

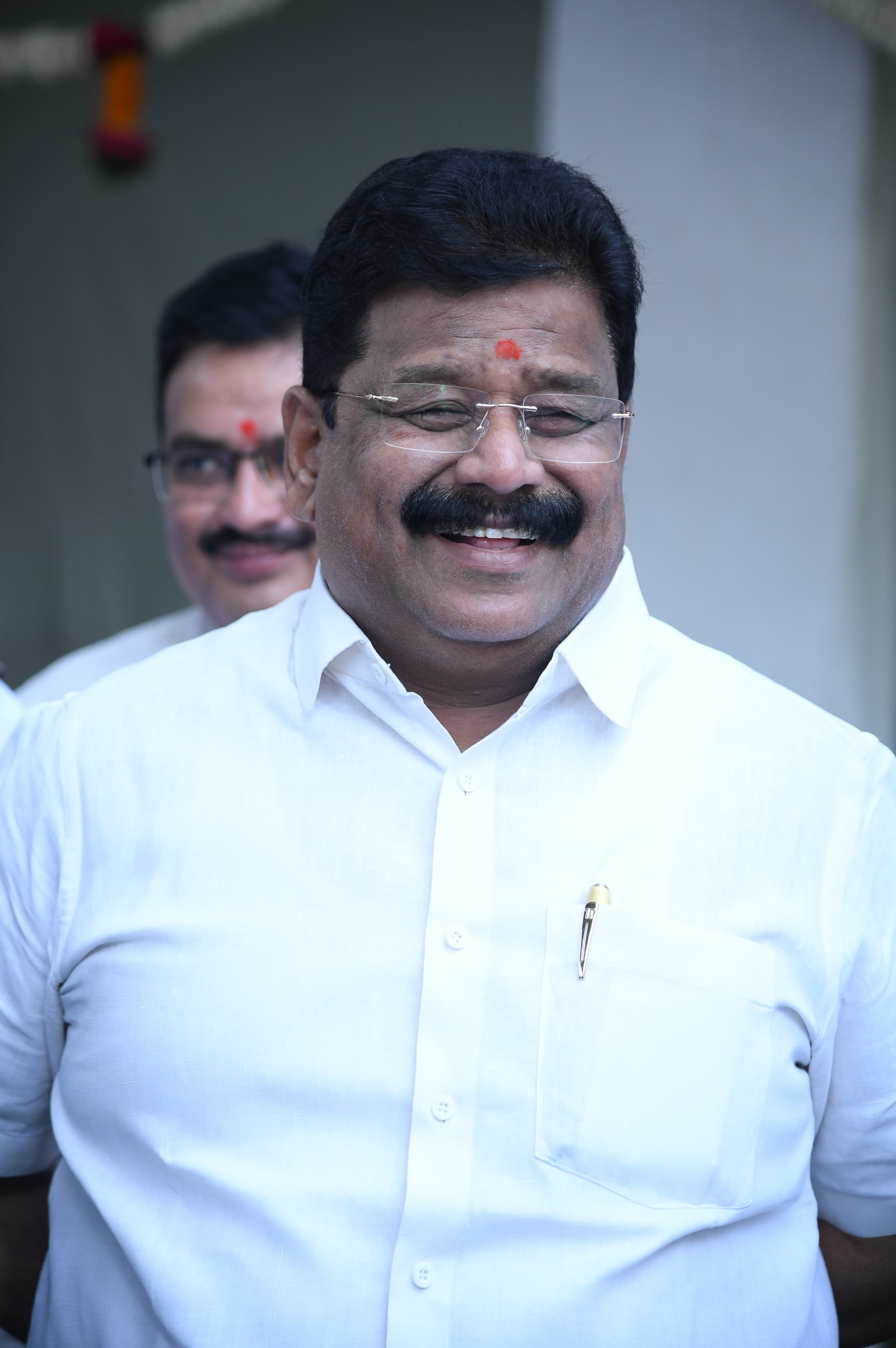
- Thakre in 2024

Member of the Maharashtra Legislative Assembly
- Incumbent
- Assumed office 2019
- Preceded by: Sudhakar Deshmukh
- Constituency: Nagpur West

President, Nagpur District Congress Committee
- Incumbent
- Assumed office 2014

Mayor of Nagpur
- In office 2002–2005

Personal details
- Born: 23 August 1966 (age 59) Nagpur, Maharashtra, India
- Party: Indian National Congress
- Education: B.Com, Nagpur University
- Profession: Politician

Vikas Pandurang Thakre (born 23 August 1966) is an Indian politician from Nagpur, Maharashtra, and a senior member of the Indian National Congress. He currently serves as a Member of the Maharashtra Legislative Assembly representing Nagpur West and holds the position of President of the Nagpur District Congress Committee. With over 40 years in public life, he has previously served as the Mayor of Nagpur and remains deeply engaged in grassroots-level politics. In 2024, he contested the Lok Sabha election from Nagpur constituency and has been known for his consistent public outreach, developmental focus, and strong presence in Vidarbha politics.

== Early life and education ==
Thakre was born on 23 August 1966 in Nagpur, Maharashtra, to Pandurang and Nirmala Thakre. He comes from a humble, non-political background. He completed his Bachelor of Commerce degree from Dharampeth Arts & Commerce College under Nagpur University in 1989.

== Political career ==
=== Early political roles ===
- 1985: Appointed as a member of the Indian National Congress
- 1988: General Secretary, NSUI Nagpur
- 1990: General Secretary, Nagpur Youth Congress
- 2001: General Secretary, Nagpur District Congress Committee

=== Municipal career ===
- 2002: Elected as Corporator (Nagarsevak), Nagpur Municipal Corporation
- 2002–2005: Served as Mayor of Nagpur
- 2007: Appointed State Representative – Ambedkar-Valmiki Awas Yojana, Maharashtra
- 2007–2012: Re-elected as Corporator
- 2010–2012: Leader of Opposition, Nagpur Municipal Corporation
- 2012–2017: Re-elected Corporator (hat-trick term); Leader of Opposition, NMC
- 2014–present: President, Nagpur District Congress Committee

=== Maharashtra Legislative Assembly ===
- 2019: Elected MLA from Nagpur West, defeating BJP’s Sudhakar Deshmukh
- 2024: Re-elected as MLA (pending EC official data confirmation)

=== 2024 Lok Sabha elections ===
- Contested as the INC candidate for Nagpur Lok Sabha seat against Nitin Gadkari
- Received significant support and vote share, emerging as runner-up
- Campaign focused on development, urban infrastructure, and youth issues

== Electoral history ==
Election Results
Year	Election Type	Constituency	Party	Result	Margin
2002	Municipal (NMC)	Nagpur	INC	Won	—
2007	Municipal (NMC)	Nagpur	INC	Won	—
2012	Municipal (NMC)	Nagpur	INC	Won	—
2019	Maharashtra Assembly	Nagpur West	INC	Won	7,716 votes
2024	Maharashtra Assembly	Nagpur West	INC	Won	~5,800*
2024	Lok Sabha	Nagpur	INC	Runner-up	-

*To be confirmed by EC

== Positions held ==
- Mayor of Nagpur (2002–2005)
- Corporator, NMC (2002–2017)
- Leader of Opposition, NMC (2010–2017)
- President, Nagpur District Congress Committee (2014–present)
- MLA, Nagpur West (2019–present)
- Trustee, Nagpur Improvement Trust (2020–2022)
- Senate Member, Rashtrasant Tukadoji Maharaj Nagpur University (2023–present)
