= Chandrapur Lok Sabha constituency =

Lok Sabha constituency in Maharashtra

Coordinates: 20.0°N 79.3°E

Chandrapur Lok Sabha
- Lok Sabha constituency
- Chandrapur Lok Sabha Constituency map

Constituency details
- Country: India
- Region: Western India
- State: Maharashtra
- Assembly constituencies: Wani; Arni; Rajura; Chandrapur; Ballarpur; Warora
- Established: 1952
- Total electors: 18,37,906 (2024)
- Reservation: None

Member of Parliament
- 18th Lok Sabha
- Incumbent Pratibha Dhanorkar
- Party: Indian National Congress
- Elected year: 2024
- Preceded by: Suresh Dhanorkar (Balu Dhanorkar)

Chandrapur is one of the 48 Lok Sabha (parliamentary) constituencies of Maharashtra state in western India. This constituency is spread over Chandrapur and Yavatmal districts.

== Assembly segments ==
At present, Chandrapur Lok Sabha constituency comprises six Vidhan Sabha (legislative assembly) segments. These segments constituency number and reservation (if any) are:

No	Name	District	Member	Party	Leading (in 2024)
70	Rajura	Chandrapur	Deorao Bhogare	BJP	INC
71	Chandrapur (SC)	Chandrapur	Kishor Jorgewar	BJP	INC
72	Ballarpur	Chandrapur	Sudhir Mungantiwar	BJP	INC
75	Warora	Chandrapur	Karan Sanjay Deotale	BJP	INC
76	Wani	Yavatmal	Sanjay Derkar	SS(UBT)	INC
80	Arni (ST)	Yavatmal	Raju Narayan Todsam	BJP	INC

== Members of Parliament ==
Year	Name	Party
1952	Mulla Abdullabhai Taherali	Indian National Congress
1957	V.N. Swami	Indian National Congress
1962	Lal Shyamshah Lal Bhagwanshah	Independent
1964^	G.M.(Tai) Kannamwar	Indian National Congress
1967	K. M. Koushik	Independent
1971	Abdul Shafee	Indian National Congress
1977	Raje Vishveshvar Rao	Janata Party
1980	Shantaram Potdukhe	Indian National Congress (I)
1984	Shantaram Potdukhe	Indian National Congress
1989	Shantaram Potdukhe	Indian National Congress
1991	Shantaram Potdukhe	Indian National Congress
1996	Hansraj Ahir	Bharatiya Janata Party
1998	Nareshkumar Puglia	Indian National Congress
1999	Nareshkumar Puglia	Indian National Congress
2004	Hansraj Ahir	Bharatiya Janata Party
2009	Hansraj Ahir	Bharatiya Janata Party
2014	Hansraj Ahir	Bharatiya Janata Party
2019	Suresh Dhanorkar †	Indian National Congress
2024	Pratibha Dhanorkar	Indian National Congress

^ by-poll

== Election results ==
=== 2024 ===
2024 Indian general elections: Chandrapur
Party	Candidate	Votes	%	±%
INC	Pratibha Suresh Dhanorkar	718,410	57.88	▲12.70
BJP	Sudhir Mungantiwar	4,58,004	36.90	▼4.66
VBA	Rajesh Warluji Bele	21,980	1.77	▼7.28
NOTA	None of the above	10,843	0.87	▼0.05
Majority		2,60,406	20.98	▲17.36
Turnout		12,41,304	67.54	▲2.65
INC hold		Swing		

=== 2019 ===
2019 Indian general elections: Chandrapur
Party	Candidate	Votes	%	±%
INC	Suresh Narayan Dhanorkar	559,507	45.18	
BJP	Hansraj Gangaram Ahir	5,14,744	41.56	
VBA	Rajendra Shriram Mahadole	1,12,079	9.05	
BSP	Sushil Wasnik	11,810	0.95	
NOTA	None of the above	11,377	0.92	
Majority		44,763	3.62	
Turnout		12,39,486	64.89	+1.61
INC gain from BJP		Swing		

=== 2014 ===
2014 Indian general elections: Chandrapur
Party	Candidate	Votes	%	±%
BJP	Hansraj Gangaram Ahir	508,049	45.77	+12.22
INC	Sanjay Wamanrao Deotale	2,71,780	24.49	−5.45
AAP	Wamanrao Sadashiv Chatap	2,04,413	18.42	New
BSP	Hansraj Gulab Kumbhare	49,229	4.44	−1.96
IND.	Pramod Mangaruji Sorte	10,930	0.98	N/A
NOTA	None of the Above	8,257	0.74	N/A
Majority		2,36,269	21.28	+17.67
Turnout		11,09,888	63.29	+4.81
BJP hold		Swing	+12.22	

=== 2009 ===
2009 Indian general elections: Chandrapur
Party	Candidate	Votes	%	±%
BJP	Hansraj Ahir	301,467	33.55%	
INC	Naresh Kumar Puglia	268,972	36.40%	
SBP	Wamanrao Chatap	1,69,112	29.90%	
BSP	Dattabhau Hazare	57,519	6.40%	
Majority		32,495	3.62%	
Turnout		8,98,515	58.42%	
BJP hold		Swing		

=== 2004 ===
2004 Indian general elections: Chandrapur
Party	Candidate	Votes	%	±%
BJP	Hansraj Ahir	366,014	43.60%	
INC	Naresh Kumar Puglia	306,191	36.40%	
BSP	Rajendra Gunwant Vaidya	104,416	12.4%	
Independent	Diwakar Gulab Pendam	26,837	3.20%	
Majority		59,823	7.10%	
Turnout		8,40,271	63.20%	
BJP hold		Swing		

== See also ==
- Yavatmal district
- Chandrapur district
- List of constituencies of the Lok Sabha
