= Kelapur Assembly constituency =

Constituency of the Maharashtra legislative assembly in India

Kelapur
- Former constituency for the Maharashtra Legislative Assembly

Constituency details
- Country: India
- Region: Western India
- State: Maharashtra
- Established: 1957
- Abolished: 2008
- Total electors: 177,304

Kelapur Assembly constituency was an assembly constituency in the India state of Maharashtra.

== Members of Legislative assembly ==
Year	Member	Party
1952	Dattatraya Krishnarao Deshmukh Parvekar	Indian National Congress
Before 1957: See Pandharkaoda Assembly constituency
1957	Tryambak Dattatraya Deshmukh Parvekar alias Abasaheb Parvekar	Indian National Congress
1962	Tryambak Dattatraya Deshmukh Parvekar alias Abasaheb Parvekar	Indian National Congress
1967	Tryambak Dattatraya Deshmukh Parvekar alias Abasaheb Parvekar	Indian National Congress
1972	Tryambak Dattatraya Deshmukh Parvekar alias Abasaheb Parvekar	Indian National Congress
1978	Lakhuji Marotrao Masram	Indian National Congress (I)
1980	Shivajirao Moghe	Indian National Congress (I)
1985	Shivajirao Moghe	Indian National Congress
1990	Deorao Jaituji Gedam	Janata Dal
1995	Shivajirao Moghe	Independent politician
1999	Shivajirao Moghe	Indian National Congress
2004	Sandip Prabhakar Dhurve	Bharatiya Janata Party
2008 onwards : See Arni Assembly constituency
2009	Shivajirao Moghe	Indian National Congress
2014	Raju Narayan Todsam	Bharatiya Janata Party
2019	Sandip Prabhakar Dhurve	Bharatiya Janata Party
2024	Raju Narayan Todsam	Bharatiya Janata Party

== Election results ==
=== Assembly Election 2004 ===
2004 Maharashtra Legislative Assembly election : Kelapur
Party	Candidate	Votes	%	±%
BJP	Sandip Prabhakar Dhurve	50,427	40.27%	▲18.86
INC	Shivajirao Moghe	45,897	36.65%	▼8.25
Independent	Niranjan Shivram Masram	15,560	12.43%	New
BSP	Ashiesh Deoraoji Gedam	7,797	6.23%	New
Independent	Madavi Neeta Anandrao	3,134	2.50%	New
SP	Krushnarao Tulashiramji Narnaware	2,416	1.93%	New
Margin of victory		4,530	3.62%	▼19.88
Turnout		1,25,294	70.67%	▲4.21
Total valid votes		1,25,231		
Registered electors		1,77,304		▲18.70
BJP gain from INC		Swing	▼4.63	

=== Assembly Election 1999 ===
1999 Maharashtra Legislative Assembly election : Kelapur
Party	Candidate	Votes	%	±%
INC	Shivajirao Moghe	44,549	44.90%	▲13.66
BJP	Kotnake Manohar Deorao	21,239	21.41%	▲5.93
NCP	Parchake Vitthal Punjaram	18,621	18.77%	New
Independent	Masaram Pradeep Gangaram	7,595	7.65%	New
Independent	Babarao Parchake (Guruji)	5,778	5.82%	New
Independent	Gedam Gulabrao Hiraman	816	0.82%	New
Independent	Marape Ganpat Kisan	622	0.63%	New
Margin of victory		23,310	23.49%	▲9.61
Turnout		1,04,763	70.14%	▼14.22
Total valid votes		99,220		
Registered electors		1,49,373		▼3.28
INC gain from Independent		Swing	▼0.22	

=== Assembly Election 1995 ===
1995 Maharashtra Legislative Assembly election : Kelapur
Party	Candidate	Votes	%	±%
Independent	Shivajirao Moghe	56,192	45.12%	New
INC	Gedam Deorao Jaituji	38,901	31.23%	▲0.49
BJP	Yerame Uddhaorao Champatrao	19,269	15.47%	▲10.56
BBM	Chintalwar Gangadhar Ramchandra	6,556	5.26%	New
Independent	Niranjan Shivram Masram	1,096	0.88%	New
Independent	Ganpat Kisan Marape	938	0.75%	New
Margin of victory		17,291	13.88%	▼17.59
Turnout		1,27,499	82.56%	▲13.02
Total valid votes		1,24,543		
Registered electors		1,54,431		▲12.28
Independent gain from JD		Swing	▼17.10	

=== Assembly Election 1990 ===
1990 Maharashtra Legislative Assembly election : Kelapur
Party	Candidate	Votes	%	±%
JD	Deorao Jaituji Gedam	57,874	62.22%	New
INC	Shivajirao Moghe	28,598	30.75%	▼41.40
BJP	Uddaorao Champatrao Yerame	4,569	4.91%	▼22.95
Independent	Vimalbai Anantrao Yedshikar	785	0.84%	New
Margin of victory		29,276	31.48%	▼12.81
Turnout		94,276	68.54%	▲11.37
Total valid votes		93,013		
Registered electors		1,37,542		▲27.20
JD gain from INC		Swing	▼9.92	

=== Assembly Election 1985 ===
1985 Maharashtra Legislative Assembly election : Kelapur
Party	Candidate	Votes	%	±%
INC	Shivajirao Moghe	43,885	72.14%	New
BJP	Yerame Uddhaorao Champatrao	16,946	27.86%	▲18.16
Margin of victory		26,939	44.28%	▼27.83
Turnout		61,782	57.14%	▲5.70
Total valid votes		60,831		
Registered electors		1,08,130		▲8.95
INC gain from INC(I)		Swing	▼9.66	

=== Assembly Election 1980 ===
1980 Maharashtra Legislative Assembly election : Kelapur
Party	Candidate	Votes	%	±%
INC(I)	Shivajirao Moghe	41,048	81.80%	▲14.67
BJP	Kotnake Gangaram Sambhaji	4,864	9.69%	New
INC(U)	Anandrao Sambhaji Masram	2,421	4.82%	New
Independent	Keram Jangaji Godraji	1,073	2.14%	New
Independent	Murkhe (Guruji) Haribhau Ramaji	772	1.54%	New
Margin of victory		36,184	72.11%	▲27.30
Turnout		51,069	51.46%	▼22.11
Total valid votes		50,178		
Registered electors		99,243		▲7.96
INC(I) hold		Swing	▲14.67	

=== Assembly Election 1978 ===
1978 Maharashtra Legislative Assembly election : Kelapur
Party	Candidate	Votes	%	±%
INC(I)	Masram Lakhuji Marotrao	44,846	67.14%	New
JP	Wagh Purushottam Vithalrao	14,916	22.33%	New
INC	Madavi Guruji Dadarao Limbaji	6,471	9.69%	▼53.27
Independent	Bhadikar Hanumantrao Govindrao	564	0.84%	New
Margin of victory		29,930	44.81%	▲15.66
Turnout		68,569	74.59%	▼2.40
Total valid votes		66,797		
Registered electors		91,922		▲3.18
INC(I) gain from INC		Swing	▲4.18	

=== Assembly Election 1972 ===
1972 Maharashtra Legislative Assembly election : Kelapur
Party	Candidate	Votes	%	±%
INC	Tryambak Dattatraya Deshmukh Parvekar alias Abasaheb Parvekar	42,105	62.96%	▲10.05
AIFB	Bhupendrasingh G. Kongharekar	22,612	33.81%	New
RPI	Kawadu Janba Nagrale	1,884	2.82%	▼0.35
Margin of victory		19,493	29.15%	▲12.86
Turnout		68,887	77.32%	▲2.14
Total valid votes		66,880		
Registered electors		89,092		▲10.49
INC hold		Swing	▲10.05	

=== Assembly Election 1967 ===
1967 Maharashtra Legislative Assembly election : Kelapur
Party	Candidate	Votes	%	±%
INC	Tryambak Dattatraya Deshmukh Parvekar alias Abasaheb Parvekar	31,113	52.91%	▼2.79
Independent	Bhupendrasingh G. Kongarekar	21,534	36.62%	New
Independent	G. C. Muneshwar	2,176	3.70%	New
ABJS	G. D. Thakre	2,119	3.60%	New
RPI	P. G. Nimsarkar	1,865	3.17%	New
Margin of victory		9,579	16.29%	▼3.16
Turnout		63,638	78.92%	▲2.75
Total valid votes		58,807		
Registered electors		80,636		▲24.47
INC hold		Swing	▼2.79	

=== Assembly Election 1962 ===
1962 Maharashtra Legislative Assembly election : Kelapur
Party	Candidate	Votes	%	±%
INC	Tryambak Dattatraya Deshmukh Parvekar alias Abasaheb Parvekar	25,324	55.70%	▼21.14
Independent	Prayagrao Bajirao Deshmukh	16,479	36.24%	New
Independent	Jagannath Laxmanrao Gedam	2,828	6.22%	New
Independent	Vyankatrao Purshottam Yadagirwar	572	1.26%	New
Margin of victory		8,845	19.45%	▼38.64
Turnout		49,008	75.65%	▲7.30
Total valid votes		45,467		
Registered electors		64,783		▲11.22
INC hold		Swing	▼21.14	

=== Assembly Election 1957 ===
1957 Bombay State Legislative Assembly election : Kelapur
Party	Candidate	Votes	%	±%
INC	Tryambak Dattatraya Deshmukh Parvekar alias Abasaheb Parvekar	28,141	76.84%	New
PSP	Vyankatrao Purushottam Yadgirwar	6,863	18.74%	New
Independent	Jaiswal Bajaranglal Sitalprasad	1,621	4.43%	New
Margin of victory		21,278	58.10%	
Turnout		36,625	62.88%	
Total valid votes		36,625		
Registered electors		58,247		
INC win (new seat)				
