= Wani Assembly constituency =

Constituency of the Maharashtra legislative assembly in India

Coordinates: 20.05°N 78.96°E

Wani
- Constituency No. 76 for the Maharashtra Legislative Assembly

Constituency details
- Country: India
- Region: Western India
- State: Maharashtra
- District: Yavatmal
- Lok Sabha constituency: Chandrapur
- Established: 1951
- Total electors: 286,307
- Reservation: None

Member of Legislative Assembly
- 15th Maharashtra Legislative Assembly
- Incumbent Sanjay Nilkanthrao Derkar
- Party: SS(UBT)
- Alliance: MVA
- Elected year: 2024

Wani Assembly constituency is one of the 288 constituencies of the Maharashtra Vidhan Sabha and one of the seven which are located in Yavatmal district.

It is a part of Chandrapur Lok Sabha constituency with the adjoining Chandrapur district along with five other Vidhan Sabha constituencies, viz. Rajura (SC), Chandrapur (SC), Ballarpur and Warora from Chandrapur district and Arni (ST) from Yavatmal district.

The remaining constituencies from Yavatmal district, Ralegaon (ST), Yavatmal, Digras and Pusad are part of Yavatmal-Washim Lok Sabha constituency while Umarkhed is part of Hingoli Lok Sabha constituency.

Wani Assembly constituency

== Members of the Legislative Assembly ==
Election	Member	Party
1952	Deorao Yeshwantrao Gohakar	Indian National Congress
1957	Shridharrao Jawade	Indian National Congress
1957	Kirtimantrao Bhujangrao	Indian National Congress
1962	Vithalrao Yeshwantrao Gohokar	Indian National Congress
1967	Vithalrao Yeshwantrao Gohokar	Indian National Congress
1972	Nandekar Dada Sitaram	Independent politician
1978	Bapurao Harbaji Panghate	Indian National Congress
1980	Bapurao Harbaji Panghate	Indian National Congress
1985	Namdeorao Narayanrao Kale	Communist Party of India
1990	Wamanrao Kasawar	Indian National Congress
1995	Wamanrao Kasawar	Indian National Congress
1999	Wamanrao Kasawar	Indian National Congress
2004	Vishwas Ramchandra Nandekar	Shiv Sena
2009	Wamanrao Kasawar	Indian National Congress
2014	Sanjivreddy Bodkurwar	Bharatiya Janata Party
2019	Sanjivreddy Bodkurwar	Bharatiya Janata Party
2024	Sanjay Derkar	Shiv Sena (UBT)

Madhya Pradesh
Bombay State

== Election results ==
=== Assembly Election 2024 ===
2024 Maharashtra Legislative Assembly election : Wani
Party	Candidate	Votes	%	±%
SS(UBT)	Sanjay Derkar	94,618	43.17%	New
BJP	Bodkurwar Sanjivreddy Bapurao	79,058	36.07%	▲3.49
MNS	Umbarkar Raju Madhukarrao	21,977	10.03%	▲2.28
Independent	Khade Sanjay Ramchandra	7,540	3.44%	New
CPI	Anil Ghanshyam Hepat	3,875	1.77%	▲0.26
VBA	Rajendra Kawduji Nimsatkar	3,605	1.64%	▼5.81
Independent	Rahul Narayan Atram	2,532	1.16%	New
Independent	Nikhil Dharma Dhurke	2,246	1.02%	New
NOTA	None of the above	1,335	0.61%	▲0.01
Margin of victory		15,560	7.10%	▼6.27
Turnout		220,518	77.02%	▲3.57
Total valid votes		219,183		
Registered electors		286,307		▲0.51
SS(UBT) gain from BJP		Swing	▲10.59	

=== Assembly Election 2019 ===
2019 Maharashtra Legislative Assembly election : Wani
Party	Candidate	Votes	%	±%
BJP	Sanjivreddy Bodkurwar	67,710	32.58%	▲9.39
INC	Wamanrao Kasawar	39,915	19.20%	▼0.80
Independent	Derkar Sanjay Nilkanthrao	25,045	12.05%	New
MNS	Raju Madhukarrao Umbarkar	16,115	7.75%	▼6.13
VBA	Dr. Mahendra Amarchandji Lodha	15,489	7.45%	New
Independent	Vishvas Ramchandra Nandekar	15,425	7.42%	New
Independent	Katkade Sunil Mahadeorao	8,473	4.08%	New
GGP	Vikas Devrao Kudmethe	6,731	3.24%	New
CPI	Anil Natthuji Ghate	3,136	1.51%	▼0.65
Sambhaji Brigade Party	Ajay Pandurang Dhobe	2,151	1.03%	New
Margin of victory		27,795	13.37%	▲10.49
Turnout		209,223	73.45%	▲0.43
Total valid votes		207,856		
Registered electors		284,853		▲5.95
BJP hold		Swing	▲9.39	

=== Assembly Election 2014 ===
2014 Maharashtra Legislative Assembly election : Wani
Party	Candidate	Votes	%	±%
BJP	Sanjivreddy Bodkurwar	45,178	23.19%	New
SS	Vishwas Ramchandra Nandekar	39,572	20.31%	▼5.64
INC	Wamanrao Bapurao Kasawaro	38,964	20.00%	▼11.94
NCP	Sanjay Nilkanthrao Derkar	31,221	16.02%	New
MNS	Raju Madhukarrao Umbarkar	27,054	13.88%	▲7.39
CPI	Anil Natthuji Ghate	4,207	2.16%	▼1.31
BSP	Adv. Rahul Pandurang Khaperde	3,552	1.82%	▼1.75
Independent	Geet Motiram Ghosh	1,497	0.77%	New
NOTA	None of the above	1,310	0.67%	New
Margin of victory		5,606	2.88%	▼3.11
Turnout		196,308	73.02%	▲2.43
Total valid votes		194,854		
Registered electors		268,850		▲8.81
BJP gain from INC		Swing	▼8.75	

=== Assembly Election 2009 ===
2009 Maharashtra Legislative Assembly election : Wani
Party	Candidate	Votes	%	±%
INC	Wamanrao Kasawar	55,666	31.94%	▼3.11
SS	Vishwas Ramchandra Nandekar	45,226	25.95%	▼19.40
Independent	Sanjay Nilakanthrao Derkar	41,330	23.71%	New
MNS	Raju Umbarkar	11,320	6.49%	New
BSP	Kotrange Dilip Narayan	6,225	3.57%	▼4.78
CPI	Anil Natthuji Ghate	6,042	3.47%	▲0.92
Independent	Bebitai Bais-patil	1,983	1.14%	New
Independent	Nilkanth Harbaji Jumde	1,628	0.93%	New
Margin of victory		10,440	5.99%	▼4.31
Turnout		174,417	70.59%	▼2.51
Total valid votes		174,289		
Registered electors		247,076		▲32.26
INC gain from SS		Swing	▼13.41	

=== Assembly Election 2004 ===
2004 Maharashtra Legislative Assembly election : Wani
Party	Candidate	Votes	%	±%
SS	Vishwas Ramchandra Nandekar	61,926	45.35%	▲17.80
INC	Wamanrao Kasawar	47,860	35.05%	▼4.23
BSP	Aitwar Ram Shekanna	11,397	8.35%	New
CPI	Geet Motiram Ghosh	3,480	2.55%	▼0.74
Independent	Anilbhau Jamanashankar Tiwari	2,997	2.19%	New
Independent	Prof. Hotey Subhash Namdeorao	2,409	1.76%	New
Shivrajya Party	Ananta Bapurao Mandavkar	1,931	1.41%	New
Independent	Abdul Naim A. Ajij	997	0.73%	New
Margin of victory		14,066	10.30%	▼1.39
Turnout		136,565	73.10%	▲5.92
Total valid votes		136,553		
Registered electors		186,811		▲18.08
SS gain from INC		Swing	▲6.07	

=== Assembly Election 1999 ===
1999 Maharashtra Legislative Assembly election : Wani
Party	Candidate	Votes	%	±%
INC	Wamanrao Kasawar	38,725	39.28%	▲6.26
NCP	Sanjay Nilkanthrao Derkar	27,202	27.59%	New
SS	Mohitkar Vinod Bhaskarrao	27,159	27.55%	▲5.06
CPI	Ghosh Geet Motiram	3,239	3.29%	▼2.46
Samajwadi Janata Party (Maharashtra)	Suresh Baliram Wuike	755	0.77%	New
Margin of victory		11,523	11.69%	▲1.16
Turnout		106,291	67.18%	▼13.76
Total valid votes		98,589		
Registered electors		158,210		▼3.74
INC hold		Swing	▲6.26	

=== Assembly Election 1995 ===
1995 Maharashtra Legislative Assembly election : Wani
Party	Candidate	Votes	%	±%
INC	Wamanrao Kasawar	42,881	33.02%	▼17.78
SS	Mohitkar Vinod Bhaskarrao	29,203	22.49%	▲1.29
Independent	Arkare Vinayak Pundilikrao	21,073	16.23%	New
Independent	Baghele Nandkumar Gopalrao	12,872	9.91%	New
CPI	Kale Devidas Pandurang	7,467	5.75%	▼2.94
Independent	Khade Rukhmangad Dadaji	5,179	3.99%	New
BSP	Wankhede Vijaya Sukhdeo	3,816	2.94%	▲1.27
Independent	Modak Suresh Vithalrao	2,673	2.06%	New
Margin of victory		13,678	10.53%	▼19.07
Turnout		133,025	80.94%	▲16.33
Total valid votes		129,858		
Registered electors		164,358		▲12.34
INC hold		Swing	▼17.78	

=== Assembly Election 1990 ===
1990 Maharashtra Legislative Assembly election : Wani
Party	Candidate	Votes	%	±%
INC	Wamanrao Kasawar	47,142	50.80%	▲18.42
SS	Thawari Guruji. D. M	19,675	21.20%	New
Independent	Ghule Vitthalrao Bapuji	10,191	10.98%	New
CPI	Kale Devidas Pandurang	8,065	8.69%	▼56.22
RPI(K)	Ashok Ukaramji Mankar	2,104	2.27%	New
BSP	Wankhade Vijay Sukdeo	1,551	1.67%	New
Independent	Kinhekar Natthu Damodhar	990	1.07%	New
Independent	Kulsange Ramchandra Zibalaji	756	0.81%	New
Margin of victory		27,467	29.60%	▼2.93
Turnout		94,524	64.61%	▲0.62
Total valid votes		92,800		
Registered electors		146,308		▲25.67
INC gain from CPI		Swing	▼14.11	

=== Assembly Election 1985 ===
1985 Maharashtra Legislative Assembly election : Wani
Party	Candidate	Votes	%	±%
CPI	Kale Namdeorao Narayanrao	47,507	64.91%	▲31.12
INC	Panghate Bapurao Harbaji	23,699	32.38%	New
Independent	Pathak Urmila	751	1.03%	New
Independent	Balki Ramesh Zitruji	607	0.83%	New
Margin of victory		23,808	32.53%	▲2.47
Turnout		74,493	63.99%	▲9.56
Total valid votes		73,187		
Registered electors		116,421		▲9.75
CPI gain from INC(I)		Swing	▲1.05	

=== Assembly Election 1980 ===
1980 Maharashtra Legislative Assembly election : Wani
Party	Candidate	Votes	%	±%
INC(I)	Panghate Bapurao Harbaji	36,058	63.86%	▼3.73
CPI	Kale Namdeorao Narayanrao	19,082	33.79%	▲22.70
Independent	Chandekar Gajanan Kawadu	1,325	2.35%	New
Margin of victory		16,976	30.06%	▼19.33
Turnout		57,732	54.43%	▼21.15
Total valid votes		56,465		
Registered electors		106,075		▲4.87
INC(I) hold		Swing	▼3.73	

=== Assembly Election 1978 ===
1978 Maharashtra Legislative Assembly election : Wani
Party	Candidate	Votes	%	±%
INC(I)	Panghate Bapurao Harbaji	50,142	67.59%	New
Independent	Nandekar Dada Sitaram	13,497	18.19%	New
CPI	Kale Namdeorao Narayan	8,230	11.09%	▲0.15
RPI	Ganjare Deorao Vithal	1,776	2.39%	New
Independent	Kurlikar ( Lad ) Nilkanth Vishwanath	545	0.73%	New
Margin of victory		36,645	49.39%	▲49.22
Turnout		76,448	75.58%	▲8.22
Total valid votes		74,190		
Registered electors		101,153		▲17.85
INC(I) gain from Independent		Swing	▲23.27	

=== Assembly Election 1972 ===
1972 Maharashtra Legislative Assembly election : Wani
Party	Candidate	Votes	%	±%
Independent	Nandekar Dada Sitaram	24,863	44.32%	New
INC	Gohokar Vimaltai Deorao	24,769	44.15%	▲4.82
CPI	Kinhekar Nathu Damodhar	6,136	10.94%	▼8.37
Margin of victory		94	0.17%	▼2.75
Turnout		57,819	67.36%	▼3.28
Total valid votes		56,098		
Registered electors		85,832		▲10.73
Independent gain from INC		Swing	▲4.99	

=== Assembly Election 1967 ===
1967 Maharashtra Legislative Assembly election : Wani
Party	Candidate	Votes	%	±%
INC	Vithalrao Yeshwantrao Gohokar	19,639	39.33%	▼19.70
Independent	D. M. Thawari	18,182	36.41%	New
CPI	N. N. Kale	9,641	19.31%	▼9.20
RPI	P. T. Kihitkar	1,542	3.09%	New
ABJS	M. B. Nawalekar	926	1.85%	New
Margin of victory		1,457	2.92%	▼27.60
Turnout		54,752	70.64%	▲2.46
Total valid votes		49,930		
Registered electors		77,512		▲3.07
INC hold		Swing	▼19.70	

=== Assembly Election 1962 ===
1962 Maharashtra Legislative Assembly election : Wani
Party	Candidate	Votes	%	±%
INC	Vithalrao Yeshwantrao Gohokar	27,514	59.03%	▼7.42
CPI	Namdeo Narayan Kale	13,287	28.51%	New
Independent	Baliram Narayan Bongirwar	3,368	7.23%	New
Independent	Motiram Ganuji Padole	1,628	3.49%	New
ABJS	Ganesh Wasudeo Sarpatwar	814	1.75%	New
Margin of victory		14,227	30.52%	▲7.05
Turnout		51,275	68.18%	▼46.46
Total valid votes		46,611		
Registered electors		75,200		▼45.33
INC hold		Swing	▲24.26	

=== Assembly Election 1957 ===
1957 Bombay State Legislative Assembly election : Wani
Party	Candidate	Votes	%	±%
INC	Shridharrao Jawade	54,828	34.77%	▼34.85
INC	Kirtimantrao Bhujangrao	49,968	31.69%	▼37.93
Independent	Panghate Latari Madhao	17,820	11.30%	New
SCF	Telange Ragho Fakru	16,514	10.47%	New
Independent	Dhurve Motiram Kawadu	13,385	8.49%	New
PSP	Rebhe Pralhad Krishnarao	5,181	3.29%	New
Margin of victory		37,008	23.47%	▼23.99
Turnout		157,696	114.64%	▲53.41
Total valid votes		157,696		
Registered electors		137,554		▲191.48
INC hold		Swing	▼34.85	

=== Assembly Election 1952 ===
1952 Madhya Pradesh Legislative Assembly election : Wani
Party	Candidate	Votes	%	±%
INC	Deorao Yeshwantrao Gohakar	20,117	69.62%	New
Socialist	Arjun Vithoba Tajne	6,404	22.16%	New
Independent	Deorao Ramchandra Khadse	2,375	8.22%	New
Margin of victory		13,713	47.46%	
Turnout		28,896	61.23%	
Total valid votes		28,896		
Registered electors		47,191		
INC win (new seat)				

== See also ==
- Yavatmal district
- List of constituencies of the Maharashtra Legislative Assembly
