= Arni Assembly constituency =

Constituency of the Maharashtra legislative assembly in India

Coordinates: 20.072618°N 77.9332778°E

Arni
- Constituency No. 80 for the Maharashtra Legislative Assembly

Constituency details
- Country: India
- Region: Western India
- State: Maharashtra
- District: Yavatmal
- Lok Sabha constituency: Chandrapur
- Established: 1951
- Total electors: 322,160
- Reservation: ST

Member of Legislative Assembly
- 15th Maharashtra Legislative Assembly
- Incumbent Raju Narayan Todsam
- Party: BJP
- Alliance: NDA
- Elected year: 2024

Arni-Kelapur Assembly constituency is one of the 288 constituencies of Maharashtra Vidhan Sabha and one of the seven which are located in Yavatmal district. It is reserved for Scheduled Tribe candidate.

It is a part of the Chandrapur (Lok Sabha constituency) with adjoining Chandrapur district along with five other Vidhan Sabha assembly constituencies, viz. Rajura, Chandrapur(SC), Ballarpur and Warora from the Chandrapur district and Wani from the Yavatmal district.

The remaining constituencies from Yavatmal district, Ralegaon(ST), Yavatmal, Digras and Pusad are part of Yavatmal-Washim (Lok Sabha constituency) while Umarkhed is part of the Hingoli (Lok Sabha constituency).

== Members of Legislative assembly ==
Year	Member	Party
1952	Dattatraya Krishnarao Deshmukh Parvekar	Indian National Congress
Before 1957: See Pandharkaoda Assembly constituency
1957	Tryambak Dattatraya Deshmukh Parvekar alias Abasaheb Parvekar	Indian National Congress
1962	Tryambak Dattatraya Deshmukh Parvekar alias Abasaheb Parvekar	Indian National Congress
1967	Tryambak Dattatraya Deshmukh Parvekar alias Abasaheb Parvekar	Indian National Congress
1972	Tryambak Dattatraya Deshmukh Parvekar alias Abasaheb Parvekar	Indian National Congress
1978	Masram Lakhuji Marotrao	Indian National Congress (I)
1980	Shivajirao Moghe	Indian National Congress (I)
1985	Shivajirao Moghe	Indian National Congress
1990	Gedam Deorao Jaituji	Janata Dal
1995	Shivajirao Moghe	Independent politician
1999	Shivajirao Moghe	Indian National Congress
2004	Sandip Prabhakar Dhurve	Bharatiya Janata Party
Before 2008: See Kelapur Assembly constituency
2009	Shivajirao Moghe	Indian National Congress
2014	Raju Narayan Todsam	Bharatiya Janata Party
2019	Sandip Prabhakar Dhurve	Bharatiya Janata Party
2024	Raju Narayan Todsam	Bharatiya Janata Party

Madhya Pradesh
Bombay State

== Election results ==
=== Assembly Election 2024 ===
2024 Maharashtra Legislative Assembly election : Arni
Party	Candidate	Votes	%	±%
BJP	Raju Narayan Todsam	127,203	54.37%	▲15.30
INC	Jitendra Shivajirao Moghe	97,890	41.84%	▲4.28
PHJSP	Neeta Anandrao Madavi	1,804	0.77%	New
BSP	Baban Sriniwas Soyam	1,700	0.73%	▼0.25
NOTA	None of the Above	1,569	0.67%	▼0.48
Margin of victory		29,313	12.53%	▲11.02
Turnout		2,35,542	73.11%	▲5.73
Total valid votes		2,33,973		
Registered electors		3,22,160		▲3.17
BJP hold		Swing	▲15.30	

=== Assembly Election 2019 ===
2019 Maharashtra Legislative Assembly election : Arni
Party	Candidate	Votes	%	±%
BJP	Dr. Sandip Prabhakar Dhurve	81,599	39.06%	▼5.00
INC	Shivajirao Moghe	78,446	37.55%	▲3.98
Independent	Raju Narayan Todsam	26,949	12.90%	New
VBA	Niranjan Shivram Masram	12,307	5.89%	New
BMP	Adv. Anil Bhimrao Kinake	2,791	1.34%	▲0.12
NOTA	None of the Above	2,411	1.15%	▲0.16
BSP	Baliram Abhiman Neware	2,032	0.97%	▼1.15
Independent	Rahul Subhash Soyam	1,332	0.64%	New
Margin of victory		3,153	1.51%	▼8.99
Turnout		2,11,566	67.75%	▼1.79
Total valid votes		2,08,883		
Registered electors		3,12,268		▲8.65
BJP hold		Swing	▼5.00	

=== Assembly Election 2014 ===
2014 Maharashtra Legislative Assembly election : Arni
Party	Candidate	Votes	%	±%
BJP	Raju Narayan Todsam	86,991	44.07%	▲12.25
INC	Shivajirao Moghe	66,270	33.57%	▼20.67
SS	Dr. Sandip Prabhakar Dhurve	30,960	15.68%	New
BSP	Shinde Ranjitha Parashram	4,197	2.13%	▼0.01
NCP	Vishnu Shankarrao Ukande	2,972	1.51%	New
BMP	Adv. Anil Bhimrao Kinake	2,410	1.22%	New
NOTA	None of the Above	1,957	0.99%	New
Margin of victory		20,721	10.50%	▼11.93
Turnout		1,99,476	69.40%	▲4.05
Total valid votes		1,97,408		
Registered electors		2,87,414		▲10.88
BJP gain from INC		Swing	▼10.18	

=== Assembly Election 2009 ===
2009 Maharashtra Legislative Assembly election : Arni
Party	Candidate	Votes	%	±%
INC	Shivajirao Moghe	90,882	54.24%	New
BJP	Uttam Raghobaji Ingale	53,301	31.81%	New
Independent	Raju Narayan Todsam	5,530	3.30%	New
GGP	Niranjan Shivram Masram	5,145	3.07%	New
BSP	Velade Laxmanrao Sonbaji	3,584	2.14%	New
CPI(M)	Sidam Govinda Gangaram	3,080	1.84%	New
Shivrajya Party	Marape Bhaurao Kisan	2,595	1.55%	New
Margin of victory		37,581	22.43%	
Turnout		1,67,590	64.65%	
Total valid votes		1,67,545		
Registered electors		2,59,220		
INC win (new seat)				
