= Pratibha Dhanorkar =

Indian politician

Pratibha Suresh Dhanorkar

Member of Parliament, Lok Sabha
- Incumbent
- Assumed office 4 June 2024
- Preceded by: Suresh Dhanorkar
- Constituency: Chandrapur

Member of Maharashtra Legislative Assembly
- In office 24 October 2019 – 4 June 2024
- Preceded by: Suresh alias Balubhau Dhanorkar
- Succeeded by: Karan Deotale
- Constituency: Warora

Personal details
- Born: 9 January 1986 (age 40) At.Warora, Dist.Chandrapur district
- Party: Indian National Congress (2019-Present)
- Other political affiliations: Shiv Sena (Till 2019)
- Spouse: Suresh Dhanorkar
- Children: Manas Dhanorkar (Son) & Parth Dhanorkar (Son)
- Education: 12th Pass B.A. - Part1 (Failed), Year - 2004-2005 From Lokmanya Tilak College, Wani
- Occupation: Agriculture & Business

Pratibha Suresh (Balubhau) Dhanorkar is an Indian politician from Maharashtra and a member of the Indian National Congress. She was elected as a member of the Legislative Assembly of Maharashtra from Warora.

Dhanorkar is the Indian National Congress candidate contesting from the Chandrapur Lok Sabha constituency in the 2024 general elections.

Dhanorkar took part in Opposition protests during the 2026 Budget Session of the Lok Sabha, during which members entered the vale and displayed placards and surrounded the front benches, including the area of the Prime Minister’s seat, and proceedings were subsequently adjourned.
