= Sudhir Mungantiwar =

Indian politician

Sudhir Vinay Mungantiwar
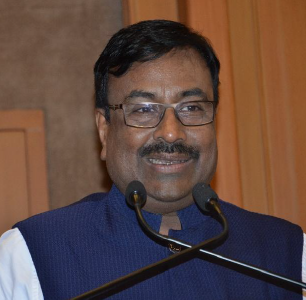

Cabinet Minister Government of Maharashtra
- In office 9 August 2022 – 26 November 2024
- Minister: Minister of Forest; Minister of Fisheries; Minister of Cultural Affairs
- Chief Minister: Eknath Shinde
- Preceded by: Eknath Shinde
- Succeeded by: Devendra Fadnavis

Cabinet Minister Government of Maharashtra
- In office 31 October 2014 – 12 November 2019
- Minister: Minister of Finance; Minister of Planning
- Chief Minister: Devendra Fadnavis
- Preceded by: Ajit Pawar
- Succeeded by: Ajit Pawar

Cabinet Minister Government of Maharashtra
- In office 31 October 2014 – 12 November 2019
- Minister: Minister of Forest
- Chief Minister: Devendra Fadnavis
- Preceded by: Patangrao Kadam
- Succeeded by: Sanjay Rathod

President of Bharatiya Janata Party, Maharashtra
- In office 3 April 2010 – 11 April 2013
- Preceded by: Nitin Gadkari
- Succeeded by: Devendra Fadnavis

Minister of state Government of Maharashtra
- In office 1995–1999
- Minister: Minister of Tourism; Minister of Consumer Protection
- Chief Minister: Manohar Joshi; Narayan Rane

Member of the Maharashtra Legislative Assembly
- Incumbent
- Assumed office 2009
- Preceded by: constituency created
- Constituency: Ballarpur
- In office 1995–2009
- Preceded by: Shyam Gopalrao wankhede
- Succeeded by: Nanaji Sitaram Shamkule
- Constituency: Chandrapur

Personal details
- Born: 29 July 1962 (age 64) Chandrapur, Maharashtra, India
- Citizenship: Indian
- Party: Bharatiya Janata Party
- Spouse: Sapna Mungantiwar
- Relations: Married
- Children: 1
- Education: M.Phil.
- Profession: Legislator

Sudhir Sachchidanand Mungantiwar (born 30 July 1962) is a legislator from the state of Maharashtra, India. He was the cabinet Minister for Forests, Cultural Affairs and Fisheries in Maharashtra Government from 2022 to 2024. He has earlier served as the Cabinet Minister of Finance & Planning and Forests departments in the Government of Maharashtra, Previously, he was the Maharashtra State President for Bharatiya Janata Party (BJP) from 2010 to 2013 and the Minister of Tourism and Consumer Protection in the Government of Maharashtra from 1995 to 1999. In 2014, he was elected to the Maharashtra Legislative Assembly to serve for a fifth consecutive term. He also holds the additional charge as the Guardian Minister of Chandrapur and Wardha districts. In March 2024, he was announced as the BJP candidate for the Chandrapur constituency in the 2024 Indian General Elections.

== Early life and political career ==
Sudhir Mungantiwar was born on 30 July 1962 in Chandrapur district in the Vidarbha region of Maharashtra.

Sudhir Mungantiwar is a member of the Rashtriya Swayamsevak Sangh (RSS), a far-right Hindu nationalist paramilitary volunteer organization. He started his political career at the age of 17 when he was appointed the secretary of the students union at the Sardar Patel Mahavidyalaya in Chandrapur and has remained politically active since then. In 1989 and 1991, he contested the Lok Sabha Elections from Chandrapur but was unsuccessful on both occasions. He completed his MPhil from Nagpur University and, in 1993, became the vice-president of the Bhartiya Janata Yuva Morcha (BJYM) in Maharashtra. In 1995, he won the Legislative Assembly elections from Chandrapur with a record margin of around 55,000 votes and eventually became the Minister of Tourism and Consumer Protection in the 'BJP-Shiv Sena' alliance's Maharashtra government, a position he held till 1999. He continued to rise in the ranks of the Bhartiya Janata Party, becoming the General Secretary of BJP's Maharashtra State unit in 1996 and the National Vice-President of Bharatiya Janta Yuva Morcha in 2001.

In 2010, Mungantiwar was unanimously elected as the Maharashtra State President for the BJP. He replaced senior leader Nitin Gadkari, who became the party's national president. After the 2014 Maharashtra Assembly Elections, Mungantiwar became the Minister of Finance & Planning and Forests in the Devendra Fadnavis ministry.

== Minister of Finance & Planning, Forests ==
As the Minister of Finance & Planning departments, Sudhir Mungantiwar played an integral role in chalking out the 'Shetkari Sanmaan Yojna' - Maharashtra state government's decision to waive around 34,000 crore worth of farmers' loans. In his 2015 budget speech, he announced his decision to implement an 'Evidence-Based Project Management System' making Maharashtra the first state in the country to implement such a system. He also played a key role in passing landmark decisions like increasing the insurance coverage for government employees and providing 180 days of paid maternity leave to women government employees. He also helped set up a 'War Room' in association with the United Nations to track policy and development projects in the state. In 2016, he led efforts to improve business and trade relations with Mauritius. This included the decision by the Mauritius government to waive 40 percent of the tax paid by filmmakers who would want to shoot in Mauritius. He also formed committees to recommend measures to improve efficiency and transparency in the areas of governmental procurement, school and college fee structures, and disbursement of scholarships.

In 2017, under his leadership, the offices of the Finance and Forest departments in Mantralaya were awarded the International Organization for Standardization (ISO) certification — ISO 9001:2015. It became the first elected officials' office in India to receive this certification.

As the Minister of Forests, he initiated a massive state-wide plantation drive, which aimed at planting 50 crore saplings by 2019. As part of this initiative, 2.81 crore saplings were planted on a single day, 1 July 2016—earning the initiative a place in the 'Limca Book of Records'. Another 5.43 crore saplings were planted against a target of 4 crore in 2017. He also led the state government to sign a Memorandum of Understanding (MoU) with Sadhguru Jaggi Vasudev's Isha Foundation to carry out large-scale plantation along the banks of rivers in Maharashtra under an initiative called Rally for Rivers. Similar MoUs were also signed with Minister of Road Transport and Highways of India, Nitin Gadkari and the then Minister of Railways, Suresh Prabhu for tree plantation along roads and railway lines respectively. Mungantiwar also approved the establishment of the Maharashtra State Zoo Authority, Nature Tourism Board, Mangroves Protection Authority and Maharashtra State Wildlife Fund for better administration and conservation efforts. He also helped launch - Maharashtra Harit Sena, or Green Army, a volunteer group that aims to participate in plantation and conservation efforts, and Hello Forest, a dedicated helpline number for all statewide forest and conservation-related issues.

== Awards and recognition ==
Over his career in public service, Sudhir Mungantiwar has been awarded many times, recognizing his political performance and social initiatives. He was named 'Man of the Year' in 2016 by Lokmat and Junior Chamber International and the 'Best Performing Politician' by the Afternoon Voice in 2015. For his efforts to uplift the blind, he was awarded G. L. Nardekar Memorial Award by The National Federation of the Blind in 2008. He is also known to be a powerful orator. Early in his career, he was awarded Maharashtra Vidhan Sabha's 'Best Orator' award in 1998.

== Special legislative efforts ==
Ever since he first assumed office, Mungantiwar has been involved in many social initiatives and legislative struggles. He played an important role in getting the Maharashtra government to rename the Nagpur University as 'Rashtrasant Tukdoji Maharaj Nagpur University' and Amravati University as 'Sant Gadgebaba Amravati University.' He was also successful in his legislative struggle to get the city of Ballarpur made into an independent tehsil. In 2011, he helped establish the Gondwana University, for Chandrapur and Gadchiroli districts.

Political offices
Preceded by Sunil Tatkare	Cabinet Minister for Finance and Planning Maharashtra State; 31 October 2014–present	Incumbent
Preceded by Patangrao Kadam	Cabinet Minister for Forest Maharashtra State; 31 October 2014–present	Incumbent
Preceded by	Maharashtra State Guardian Minister for Chandrapur district December 2014–present	Incumbent
Preceded by	Maharashtra State Guardian Minister for Wardha district December 2014–present	Incumbent
