= Sanjay Yadaorao Dhote =

Indian politician

Sanjay Yadaorao Dhote is a member of the 13th Maharashtra Legislative Assembly. He represents the Rajura Assembly Constituency. He belongs to the Bharatiya Janata Party. He had unsuccessfully contested the 2009 elections on Swatantra Bharat Paksha (SBP) ticket but lost to Subhash Dhote of the Indian National Congress. His 2014 victory has been described as an upset win. He has failed to provide employment for youths and his performance in assembly is not satisfactory.
