= Abdul Shafee =

अब्दुल शफी Abdul Shafee عبد الشافي
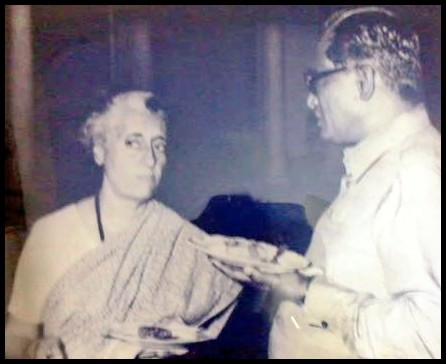
- MP Abdul Shafee with PM Indira Gandhi

Member of Parliament, 5th Lok Sabha
- In office Mar 1971 – May 1977
- Preceded by: K. M. Koushik
- Succeeded by: Raje Vishveshvar Rao
- Constituency: Chandrapur

Personal details
- Born: 23 November 1925 Bhandara, Maharashtra, British India
- Died: 26 April 2004 (aged 78) Rajoli, Maharashtra, India
- Citizenship: India
- Party: Indian National Congress
- Parent: Mr. Lalmiya (Father)
- Profession: Businessman, Agriculturist, Politician Religion - Islam (Sunni)

Abdul Shafee (23 November 1925 – 26 April 2004) was an Indian politician. A member of the Indian National Congress, he served as a Member of Parliament in the 5th Lok Sabha. Shafee represented the Chandrapur constituency (formally known as Chanda). He was also a Member of Legislative Council of Maharashtra Vidhan Sabha, First Zilla Parishad President of Chandrapur, First Sarpanch of Rajoli. Shafee was a social activist and head of BSS (Bharat Sevak Samaj) before entering national politics.

== Early life and education ==
Abdul Shafee was born in Bhandara, in the state of Maharashtra. He was an agriculturist and businessman before joining politics.

== Political career ==
Abdul Shafee was active politics from the 1950s and joined Congress party. He was an MP for only one term. Shafee succeeded K. M. Koushik of Swatantra Party. After the 5th Lok Sabha, Chanda constituency ceased to exist and new constituency Chandrapur came into existence. Shafi's successor was Raje Vishveshvar Rao, who was a member of the Janata Party. Prior to entering the Lok Sabha, he was a member of the Gram Panchayat and Zila Parishad in various capacities.

== Death ==
Shafee died in Nagpur, Maharashtra on 26 April 2004, at the age of 78.

== Posts held ==
#	From	To	Position
01	1971	1977	Member, 5th Lok Sabha
02	1980	1985	Member, Maharashtra Legislative Assembly

== See also ==
- 5th Lok Sabha
- Lok Sabha
- Politics of India
- Parliament of India
- Government of India
- Indian National Congress
- Chandrapur
