= Sanjay Derkar =

Indian politician

Member of Maharashtra Legislative Assembly
- Incumbent
- Assumed office (2024 - Present)
- Preceded by: Sanjivreddy Bapurao Bodkurwar
- Constituency: Wani

Personal details
- Born: Sanjay Nilkanthrao Derkar; 17 January 1964 (age 62) At.Wani, Dist.Yavatmal District, Maharashtra
- Party: Shiv Sena(UBT) (2021-present)
- Other political affiliations: Nationalist Congress Party (before 2021)
- Spouse: Kiran Sanjay Derkar
- Children: 1 Daughter; Bhairavi Derkar
- Parent: Nilkanthrao Keshavrao Derkar (father)
- Education: Post Graduate M.Sc. (Chemistry) From Bhopal University, Bhopal Year- 1986.

Sanjay Nilkanthrao Derkar (born 1964) is an Indian politician from Maharashtra. He is an MLA from Wani Assembly constituency in Yavatmal district. He won the 2024 Maharashtra Legislative Assembly election representing the Shiv Sena (UBT).

== Early life and education ==
Derkar is from Wani, Yavatmal district, Maharashtra. He is the son of Nilkanthrao Keshavrao Derkar. He completed his MSc in chemistry at Bhopal University, Bhopal in 1986.

== Career ==
Derkar made his electoral debut and became an MLA for the first time winning from Wani Assembly constituency representing Shiv Sena (UBT) in the 2024 Maharashtra Legislative Assembly election. He polled 94,618 votes and defeated his nearest rival, Sanjivreddy Bapurao Bodkurwar of the Bharatiya Janata Party, by a margin of 15,560 votes. Earlier, he lost the 2019 Maharashtra Legislative Assembly election as an independent candidate. He finished third to winner Sanjivreddy Bapurao Bodkurwar of the BJP who polled 67,710 votes and Wamanrao Bapurao Kasawar of the Indian National Congress, got 25,045 votes. Derkar garnered 39,915 votes.
