= Suresh Dhanorkar =

Indian politician (1975–2023)

- सुरेश धानोरकर

Member of parliament, Lok Sabha
- In office 23 May 2019 – 30 May 2023
- Preceded by: Hansraj Gangaram Ahir
- Succeeded by: Pratibha Dhanorkar
- Constituency: Chandrapur

Member of Legislative Assembly of Maharashtra
- In office 2014–2019
- Preceded by: Sanjay Wamanrao Deotale
- Succeeded by: Pratibha Dhanorkar
- Constituency: Warora-Bhadravati

Personal details
- Born: Suresh Narayan Dhanorkar; 4 July 1975 Wani, Maharashtra, India
- Died: 30 May 2023 (aged 47) Gurgaon, Haryana, India
- Party: Indian National Congress (2019-2023)
- Other political affiliations: Shiv Sena (2006-2019)
- Spouse: MLA-Pratibha Dhanorkar
- Children: Manas Dhanorkar (Son) & Parth Dhanorkar (Son)
- Education: 12th Pass BA - Part 1 Year 1998-1999, Vivekanand College, Bhadravati, D.Farm Part 1 Year 1996-1997, Lokmanya Tilak College, wani.
- Occupation: Politician And Farmer
- Nickname: Balubhau Dhanorkar

Suresh (alias Balu) Narayan Dhanorkar, also called Balubhau Dhanorkar, was an Indian politician who was the elected member of the Lok Sabha from Chandrapur constituency. He was a member of the Indian National Congress political party. He was the only candidate for the INC to be elected as MP from Maharashtra.

He was nominated as the Lok Sabha candidate after resigning as MLA from Shiv Sena and had joined the Indian National Congress Party.

== Political career ==
In 2006, Dhanorkar became the Shiv Sena president for the Chandrapur District. In 2014 he became the Shiv Sena MLA from Warora-Bhadrawati. In the 2019 Indian general election, Dhanorkar became the INC MP from Chandrapur Lok Sabha constituency, becoming the only elected INC MP from Maharashtra in the Lok Sabha. He served as MP until his death. His wife was Maharashtra MLA Pratibha Dhanorkar.

== Death ==
Dhanorkar died due to complications from kidney stones on 30 May 2023, at the age of 47, at Medanta Hospital in Gurugram.
