= Rajura Assembly constituency =

Constituency of the Maharashtra legislative assembly in India

Coordinates: 19.78°N 79.37°E

Rajura
- Constituency No. 70 for the Maharashtra Legislative Assembly
- Subhash Dhote, present MLA of Rajura

Constituency details
- Country: India
- Region: Western India
- State: Maharashtra
- District: Chandrapur
- Lok Sabha constituency: Chandrapur
- Established: 1957
- Total electors: 325,512
- Reservation: None

Member of Legislative Assembly
- 15th Maharashtra Legislative Assembly
- Incumbent Deorao Vithoba Bhongle
- Party: BJP
- Alliance: NDA
- Elected year: 2024

Rajura Assembly constituency is one of the six constituencies of the Maharashtra Vidhan Sabha located in Chandrapur district.

It is a part of the Chandrapur Lok Sabha constituency along with five other assembly constituencies, viz Warora Assembly constituency, Ballarpur, Chnadrapur (SC) from Chandrapur district and Wani and Arni from the neighbouring Yavatmal district.

== Members of the Legislative Assembly ==
Year	Member	Party
1957	Dhote Ramchandra Ganpati	Indian National Congress
1962	Vithalrao Dhote	Indian National Congress
1967	S. B. Jiwtode Guruji	Independent
1972	Vithalrao Dhote	Indian National Congress
1978	Baburao Musale	Janata Party
1980	Prabhakarrao Mamulkar	Indian National Congress (I)
1985	Prabhakarrao Mamulkar	Indian National Congress
1990	Wamanrao Chatap	Janata Dal
1995	Wamanrao Chatap	Independent
1999	Sudarshan Nimkar	Indian National Congress
2004	Wamanrao Chatap	Swatantra Bharat Paksha
2009	Subhash Dhote	Indian National Congress
2014	Sanjay Dhote	Bharatiya Janata Party
2019	Subhash Dhote	Indian National Congress
2024	Deorao Bhongle	Bharatiya Janata Party

== Election results ==
=== Assembly Election 2024 ===
2024 Maharashtra Legislative Assembly election : Rajura
Party	Candidate	Votes	%	±%
BJP	Deorao Vithoba Bhongle	72,882	30.66%	▲7.80
INC	Subhash Ramchandrarao Dhote	69,828	29.38%	▲2.41
SBP	Adv. Chatap Wamanrao Sadashiv	55,090	23.18%	▼2.67
GGP	Gajanan Godru Patil Jumnake	28,529	12.00%	▼7.39
MNS	Sachin Bapurao Bhoyar	4,252	1.79%	▲0.92
NOTA	None of the Above	1,036	0.44%	▼0.26
Margin of victory		3,054	1.28%	▲0.16
Turnout		238,714	73.33%	▲2.36
Total valid votes		237,678		
Registered electors		325,512		
BJP gain from INC		Swing	▲3.69	

=== Assembly Election 2019 ===
2019 Maharashtra Legislative Assembly election : Rajura
Party	Candidate	Votes	%	±%
INC	Subhash Ramchandrarao Dhote	60,228	26.97%	▼3.58
SBP	Wamanrao Sadashivrao Chatap	57,727	25.85%	▲18.00
BJP	Sanjay Yadaorao Dhote	51,051	22.86%	▼8.78
GGP	Godru Patil Jumnake	43,306	19.39%	▲15.76
MNS	Mahaling Naganand Kanthale	1,948	0.87%	New
Independent	Charade Suresh Jairam	1,667	0.75%	New
NOTA	None of the Above	1,563	0.70%	▲0.07
BSP	Bhanudash Prakash Jadhav	1,469	0.66%	▼3.19
Margin of victory		2,501	1.12%	▲0.03
Turnout		225,020		▲0.11
Total valid votes		223,294		
Registered electors		316,018		
INC gain from BJP		Swing	▼4.67	

=== Assembly Election 2014 ===
2014 Maharashtra Legislative Assembly election : Rajura
Party	Candidate	Votes	%	±%
BJP	Sanjay Yadaorao Dhote	66,223	31.64%	New
INC	Subhash Ramchandrarao Dhote	63,945	30.55%	▼3.50
NCP	Nimkar Sudarshan Bhagwanrao	29,528	14.11%	New
SBP	Prabhakar Vittharao Dive	16,439	7.85%	▼17.29
BSP	Atram Bharat Kawadu	8,049	3.85%	▼3.10
GGP	Sudhakar Narayan Kinake	7,601	3.63%	New
SS	Hemant Wairagade	5,912	2.82%	▼1.31
NOTA	None of the Above	1,324	0.63%	New
Margin of victory		2,278	1.09%	▼7.82
Turnout		210,635		▲3.21
Total valid votes		209,308		
Registered electors		296,699		
BJP gain from INC		Swing	▼2.42	

=== Assembly Election 2009 ===
2009 Maharashtra Legislative Assembly election : Rajura
Party	Candidate	Votes	%	±%
INC	Subhash Ramchandrarao Dhote	61,476	34.05%	▲1.55
SBP	Sanjay Yadaorao Dhote	45,389	25.14%	▼12.52
Independent	Nimje Arun Keshao	17,756	9.84%	New
BSP	Prof. Dr. Lohe Sanjayrao Gosai	12,533	6.94%	▼6.84
MNS	Thakare Suraj Arvind	10,048	5.57%	New
SS	Nawale Arun Narayan	7,467	4.14%	New
Independent	Kude Nilkanth Konduji	6,729	3.73%	New
Margin of victory		16,087	8.91%	▲3.76
Turnout		180,524	67.34%	▼6.00
Total valid votes		180,523		
Registered electors		268,075		▲11.83
INC gain from SBP		Swing	▼3.61	

=== Assembly Election 2004 ===
2004 Maharashtra Legislative Assembly election : Rajura
Party	Candidate	Votes	%	±%
SBP	Wamanrao Sadashivrao Chatap	66,216	37.66%	▲5.80
INC	Nimkar Sudarshan Bhagwanrao	57,155	32.51%	▼4.88
BSP	Arun Ramchandrarao Dhote	24,230	13.78%	New
Independent	Satva Kerba Thorat	4,569	2.60%	New
Independent	Nawale Arun Narayanrao	4,464	2.54%	New
BBM	Pawar Tukaram Khema	3,460	1.97%	New
Ambedkarist Republican Party	Ampale Dhondiram Khanduji	2,667	1.52%	New
Margin of victory		9,061	5.15%	▼0.37
Turnout		175,819	73.34%	▲6.29
Total valid votes		175,819		
Registered electors		239,726		▲18.65
SBP gain from INC		Swing	▲0.27	

=== Assembly Election 1999 ===
1999 Maharashtra Legislative Assembly election : Rajura
Party	Candidate	Votes	%	±%
INC	Sudarashan Bhagwanrao Nimkar	50,654	37.39%	▲7.61
SBP	Wamanrao Sadashivrao Chatap	43,171	31.86%	New
SS	Hemant Shukram Wairagade	34,238	25.27%	▲13.57
GGP	Vilas Narayanrao Bongirwar	4,360	3.22%	New
Independent	Pathade Siddharth Astik	2,325	1.72%	New
Margin of victory		7,483	5.52%	▼6.13
Turnout		144,964	71.75%	▼15.23
Total valid votes		135,485		
Registered electors		202,053		▲1.75
INC gain from Independent		Swing	▼4.04	

=== Assembly Election 1995 ===
1995 Maharashtra Legislative Assembly election : Rajura
Party	Candidate	Votes	%	±%
Independent	Wamanrao Sadashivrao Chatap	67,690	41.43%	New
INC	Mamulkar Prabhakar Bapurao	48,645	29.77%	▼5.80
SS	Wairagade Umesh Alias Hemant Shukram	19,110	11.70%	New
BBM	Pawar Tukaram Khema	14,994	9.18%	New
Independent	Dhote Arun Ramchandrarao	4,585	2.81%	New
BSP	Gedam Prabhakar Ganpat	2,893	1.77%	▲1.41
JD	Namwad Madhaorao Vitthalrao	1,417	0.87%	▼44.65
Margin of victory		19,045	11.66%	▲1.71
Turnout		167,399	84.30%	▲21.60
Total valid votes		163,388		
Registered electors		198,570		▲14.39
Independent gain from JD		Swing	▼4.09	

=== Assembly Election 1990 ===
1990 Maharashtra Legislative Assembly election : Rajura
Party	Candidate	Votes	%	±%
JD	Wamanrao Sadashivrao Chatap	47,949	45.52%	New
INC	Mamulkar Prabhakar Bapurao	37,476	35.57%	▼15.22
BJP	Chandel Chandansing Sadhusing	10,139	9.62%	New
RPI	Mohamad Isaq Mohamad Yakub	8,177	7.76%	New
Margin of victory		10,473	9.94%	▼13.17
Turnout		107,534	61.95%	▲2.63
Total valid votes		105,345		
Registered electors		173,591		▲30.08
JD gain from INC		Swing	▼5.28	

=== Assembly Election 1985 ===
1985 Maharashtra Legislative Assembly election : Rajura
Party	Candidate	Votes	%	±%
INC	Mamulkar Prabhakar Bapurao	39,356	50.80%	New
IC(S)	Babasaheb Sonbaji Wasade	21,446	27.68%	New
Independent	Bavne Maroti Pundlik	5,535	7.14%	New
Independent	Musale Daorao Janardhan	5,358	6.92%	New
Independent	Chaudhari Shridharrao Sambshio	1,625	2.10%	New
Independent	Pechal Nirmala Purankumar	1,480	1.91%	New
Independent	Meshram Charandas Fakru	1,156	1.49%	New
Margin of victory		17,910	23.12%	▲0.43
Turnout		79,498	59.57%	▲5.60
Total valid votes		77,478		
Registered electors		133,453		▲11.60
INC gain from INC(I)		Swing	▼6.97	

=== Assembly Election 1980 ===
1980 Maharashtra Legislative Assembly election : Rajura
Party	Candidate	Votes	%	±%
INC(I)	Mamulkar Prabhakar Bapurao	36,235	57.76%	New
BJP	Dhote Prabhakar Marotrao	22,001	35.07%	New
RPI	Malkhede Udhao Arjuna	3,522	5.61%	New
Independent	Sidam Jangu Maru	550	0.88%	New
Independent	Patil Domaji Vithu	424	0.68%	New
Margin of victory		14,234	22.69%	▲14.41
Turnout		64,469	53.91%	▼11.99
Total valid votes		62,732		
Registered electors		119,584		▲7.92
INC(I) gain from JP		Swing	▲14.65	

=== Assembly Election 1978 ===
1978 Maharashtra Legislative Assembly election : Rajura
Party	Candidate	Votes	%	±%
JP	Musale Baburao Janardhan	30,786	43.11%	New
Independent	Mamulkar Prabhakar Bapurao	24,873	34.83%	New
Independent	Jitode Shrihari Baliram	7,879	11.03%	New
Independent	Malkhede Udhao Arjuna	3,627	5.08%	New
Independent	Garpelliwar Kisanrao Nathuji	2,458	3.44%	New
Independent	Alone Sadasio Sakaram	968	1.36%	New
Independent	Sidam Kawaru Pandurang	824	1.15%	New
Margin of victory		5,913	8.28%	▼5.57
Turnout		73,731	66.54%	▲7.33
Total valid votes		71,415		
Registered electors		110,803		▲19.36
JP gain from INC		Swing	▼7.96	

=== Assembly Election 1972 ===
1972 Maharashtra Legislative Assembly election : Rajura
Party	Candidate	Votes	%	±%
INC	Vithalrao Laxmanrao Dhote	27,079	51.07%	▲11.32
Independent	Musale Deorao Janardhan	19,735	37.22%	New
RPI	Unhao Arjun Malkhede	6,213	11.72%	▲3.71
Margin of victory		7,344	13.85%	▲4.97
Turnout		55,403	59.68%	▲0.09
Total valid votes		53,027		
Registered electors		92,833		▲20.08
INC gain from Independent		Swing	▲2.45	

=== Assembly Election 1967 ===
1967 Maharashtra Legislative Assembly election : Rajura
Party	Candidate	Votes	%	±%
Independent	S. B. Jiwtode Guruji	21,435	48.62%	New
INC	Vithalrao Laxmanrao Dhote	17,521	39.74%	▼4.24
RPI	K. Mahbubkhan	3,532	8.01%	New
Independent	D. D. Jiwtode	1,375	3.12%	New
Margin of victory		3,914	8.88%	▲8.74
Turnout		47,264	61.14%	▼0.11
Total valid votes		44,087		
Registered electors		77,309		▼14.86
Independent gain from INC		Swing	▲4.64	

=== Assembly Election 1962 ===
1962 Maharashtra Legislative Assembly election : Rajura
Party	Candidate	Votes	%	±%
INC	Vithalrao Laxmanrao Dhote	22,818	43.98%	▼3.25
Independent	Yadaorao Ramchandrarao Dhote	22,745	43.84%	New
Independent	Budhaji Pithuji Rangari	5,362	10.33%	New
Margin of victory		73	0.14%	▼14.76
Turnout		54,159	59.64%	▲6.48
Total valid votes		51,882		
Registered electors		90,807		▲23.46
INC hold		Swing	▼3.25	

=== Assembly Election 1957 ===
1957 Bombay State Legislative Assembly election : Rajura
Party	Candidate	Votes	%	±%
INC	Dhote Ramchandra Ganpati	17,598	47.23%	New
Independent	Dhote Yadao Ramchandra	12,048	32.34%	New
Independent	Gaikwad Bhagwant Manikrao	7,613	20.43%	New
Margin of victory		5,550	14.90%	
Turnout		37,259	50.66%	
Total valid votes		37,259		
Registered electors		73,551		
INC win (new seat)				

== See also ==
- Rajura
- Korpana
- Jiwati
