= Sardar Patel Mahavidyalaya, Chandrapur =

- Type: Private
- Established: 1970
- Founders: Shantaram Potdukhe
- Affiliations: Gondwana University
- President: Sudhatai Potdukhe
- Vice-president: Purushottam Dhankar
- Principal: Dr. R. P. Ingole
- Undergraduates: Yes
- Postgraduates: Yes
- Location: Ganj Ward, Chandrapur, Maharashtra, 442402, India
- Campus: 2 Acres
- Nickname: SPM
- Website: www.spm.ac.in

Sardar Patel Mahavidyalaya, Chandrapur (SPM), is located in Chandrapur, Maharashtra, India. The college was established in 1970 by late Shri Shantaram Potdukhe. It is managed by the Sarvodaya Shikshan Sanstha, Chandrapur. It is affiliated to Gondwana University Gadchiroli.

== Faculties and Departments ==
=== Faculties ===
- Arts
- Commerce
- Science
- Computer Science

== See also ==
- List of Universities in India
- Gondwana University
