= K. M. Koushik =

Member of Parliament, 4th Lok Sabha
- In office Mar 1967 – Dec 1970
- Preceded by: G. M. Tai Kannamwar
- Succeeded by: Abdul Shafee
- Constituency: Chandrapur

Personal details
- Born: 8 November 1906 Manchanhalli, Mysore State
- Citizenship: India
- Party: Swatantra Party
- Other party: Congress
- Spouse: Savithribai
- Parent: Madhavra alias Venkatkrishna (father)
- Profession: Advocate & Politician

K. M. Koushik (born 8 November 1906, date of death unknown) was an Indian politician and a Member of Parliament of India. Koushik was a member of the 4th Lok Sabha and represented the Chandrapur (formally known as Chanda till 5th Lok Sabha) constituency of Maharashtra. He was a member of the Swatantra Party during his term as M.P.

== Early life and education ==
Koushik was born in Manchanhalli which then was a part of Mysore State. Koushik attended Central College of Bangalore and College of Science and Law College in Nagpur and worked as an advocate before joining politics. Koushik was also a public prosecutor and Government Pleader in the former State of M. P. (present state of Maharashtra) from 1950 to 1962.

== Political career ==
Koushik contested the 1967 general elections as a member of Swatantra Party. He was a Member of Parliament for only one term.

== Posts Held ==
#	From	To	Position
01	1967	1970	Member, 4th Lok Sabha

== See also ==
- 4th Lok Sabha
- Lok Sabha
- Politics of India
- Parliament of India
- Government of India
- Swatantra Party
- Indian National Congress
- Chandrapur
