= Warora =

City in Maharashtra, India

- city
- Warora
- Location in Maharashtra, India
- Coordinates: 20.230013°N 79.0008°E
- Country: India
- State: Maharashtra
- District: Chandrapur

Government
  - Type: Mayor council government
  - Body: Municipal council of warora
  - MLA: Karan Sanjay Deotale

Area
  - Total: 22.50 km^{2} (8.69 sq mi)
  - Rank: 4th in Chandrapur Dist
- Elevation: 211 m (692 ft)

Population (2011)
  - Total: 72,126
  - Density: 3,206/km^{2} (8,302/sq mi)

Languages
  - Official: Marathi
- Time zone: UTC+5:30 (IST)
- Postal code: 442907
- Vehicle registration: MH-34

Warora is a Town and municipal council in Chandrapur district in the Indian state of Maharashtra. During the British Raj, the town was part of the Central Provinces and was a coal-mining center. The work place of famous social worker Baba Amte, "Anandwan" is situated in Warora.

== History ==
The story of Tata Steel is a century old and Sir Jamsetji Tata had idea of starting a steel plant near Warora region. At the age of forty-three in 1882, Jamsetji read a report by a German geologist, Ritter von Schwartz, that the best situated deposits of iron ore were in Chandrapur district in the Central provinces, not far from Nagpur where he worked. They area named was Lohara, after the iron ore deposits nearby. In the vicinity, Warora had deposits of coal. Jamsetji is believed to have visited Lohara himself and obtained specimens of Warora coal for testing. He took a consignment of coal with him and had it tested in Germany. The coal was found unsuitable. The mining terms offered by the government were too restrictive, and Jamsetji gave up the project. But the idea of giving India a steel plant abided with him.

== Geography ==
Warora is located at 20.23°N 79.0°E. Its average elevation is 250 meters (820.21 feet).

== Demographics ==
The population recorded, as per the 2011 census of India, was 46,571 (52% male, 48% female, and 12% under the age of six years). The average literacy rate in Warora is 77% which is higher than the national average (59.5%). Male literacy is higher (82%) than female (72%).

Year	Male	Female	Total Population	Change	Religion (%)							
Year	Male	Female	Total Population	Change	Hindu	Muslim	Christian	Sikhs	Buddhist	Jain	Other religions and persuasions	Religion not stated
2001	21684	20287	41971	-	80.861	8.141	0.331	0.129	8.103	1.782	0.615	0.038
2011	23424	23108	46532	0.109	81.213	8.620	0.329	0.142	7.859	1.369	0.215	0.254

== See also ==
- Warora (Vidhan Sabha constituency)
