= Kishor Jorgewar =

Indian politician

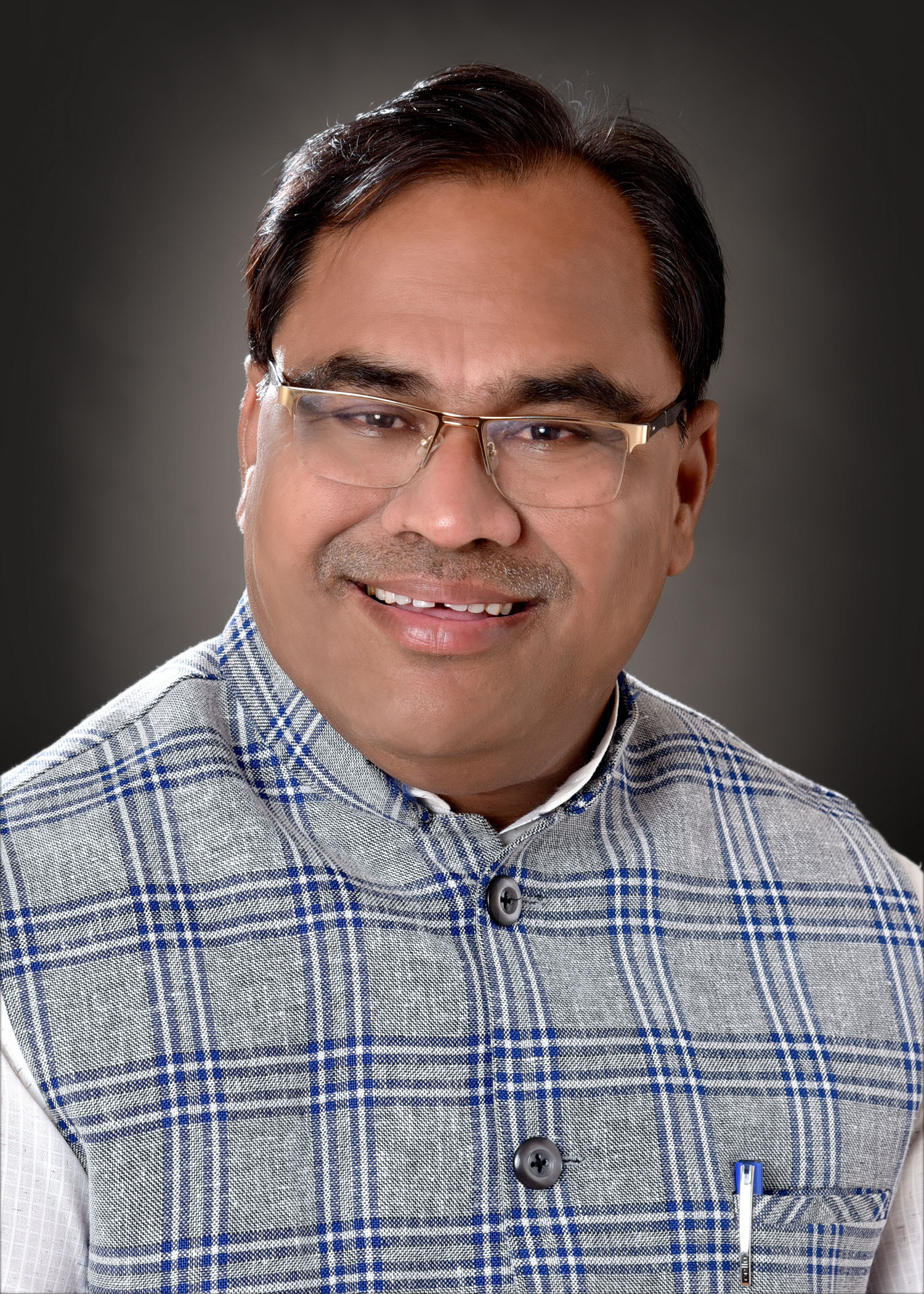

Member of Maharashtra Legislative Assembly
- In office 24 October 2019
- Preceded by: Nanaji Shamkule
- Constituency: Chandrapur

Personal details
- Born: 17 December 1968 (age 57) Chandrapur, Maharashtra, India
- Party: Bhartiya Janata Party (Oct 2024-Present)
- Other political affiliations: Independent; Shiv Sena; (Till 2019)
- Spouse: Kalyani Jorgewar
- Occupation: Businessman, Political & Social Activist

Kishor Gajanan Jorgewar (born 17 December 1968) is an Indian politician. He was elected to the Maharashtra Legislative Assembly from Chandrapur in 2024 Maharashtra Legislative Assembly election as a BJP candidate and in the 2019 Maharashtra Legislative Assembly election as an Independent candidate. Previously, he was associated with Shiv Sena. He is also President of Young Chanda Brigade, Chandrapur and Vidarbha Burud Samaj.

== Early life ==
Kishor Jorgewar was born in Chandrapur. He also completed his schooling from Chandrapur. He has been working for more than 14 years for the common people of Chandrapur District on various issues such as relief during floods. He has been working in the field of providing education, jobs, city development among others. The people of Chandrapur call him "The leader of the masses" (Marathi: जनसामान्यांचा नेता) for his social work.

== Political career ==
He has vast experience in politics and social framework of Chandrapur District. He has been a Board Director of Shri. Kanyaka Nagri Co-operative Bank. He has played a pivotal role in upliftment of backward class youth. He is a president of Young Chanda Brigade, Chandrapur and Vidharbh Burud Samaj.

In 2014, he was a Shivsena candidate against Shamkule. In the 2019 Maharashtra Legislative Assembly election as an Independent candidate Kishor Jorgewar had a historic victory winning by a massive margin of 72,107 votes from Chandrapur constituency. In the 2024 Maharashtra Legislative Assembly election as a member of Bharatiya Janta Party he got elected from Chandrapur constituency for a second time.
