= Wamanrao Chatap =

Indian politician

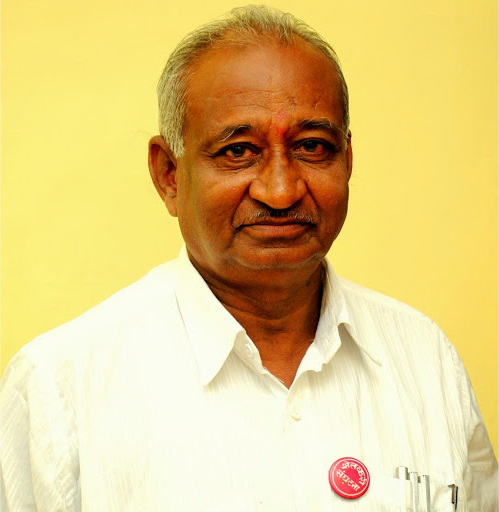
- Wamanrao S. Chatap

Member of Maharashtra Legislative Assembly
- In office (1990-1995), (1995-1999), (2004 – 2009)
- Preceded by: Prabhakarrao Mamulkar
- Succeeded by: Subhash Dhote
- Constituency: Rajura

Personal details
- Born: 13 May 1952 (age 74) Bibi, Rajura, Maharashtra
- Party: Swatantra Bharat Paksha (SBP)
- Other political affiliations: Shetakari Sanghatana (शेतकरी संघटना)
- Occupation: Lawyer, Politician
- Known for: Shetkari Sanghatana (Farmers organisation)

Wamanrao Sadashivrao Chatap (born 13 May 1952) is the former president of Shetkari Sanghatana (farmers' Organisation). He was also President of the Swatantra Bharat Paksha representing Maharashtra in the Maharashtra Legislative Assembly, the lower house. He was MLA for three times, and was awarded "Best Performer in assembly" twice. He practised as a lawyer in Chandrapur district court from 1976 to 1980.

In 1990 he won his first Legislative Assembly from Rajura assembly, to be elected as a MLA. After this, due to his progressive work and popularity in constituency, he was elected as MLA twice. A lawyer relentless crusader against the inequality of system and lack of focus on alleviation of inequities. Wamanrao is in the forefront of secgrass roots movements in Maharashtra. A former member of Maharashtra Assembly, he has strived for better governance and raised the bar in public representation.

== Early life and education ==
He born in Bibi in Korpana Taluka of Chandrapur district in Indian state of Maharashtra. He had completed Law degree. There is biography written on him as "khadtar yatrecha vatsaru." His journey from child of farmer family to best member of legislative assembly is very impressive. He is very studious and hardworking person . Give more importance to values and policies than politics. So, he has so many followers with him.

== Political Profile ==
Former president of Shetkari Sanghatna (Maharashtra). President of Swatantra Bharat Paksha. Represented Assembly thrice as a MLA. Awarded twice as top performer in parliament. He has been an active supporter of farmers rights, and due to active protesting he had been in jail for 27 times for the sake of farmers. He also utilised a fund of ₹157 crores for people welfare during his first term of MLA. He also constructed seven bridges on Wardha river. He has also visited six countries to understand the working of political system there. He has constructed Government Hospital in Gadchandur and Korpana. Courts were also established under his reign. He brought twelve villages under the control of Maharashtra Government from Telangana (then Andhra Pradesh). Sanctioned ₹15.2 crores for water purification projects. Provided thousands of shelters to backward class people like Kolam, Adivasi, etc. Recently he was awarded by the prestigious Baburao Potdukhe Memorial Award. He was Chief Minister of Vidarbha Mock assembly in 2013. He dedicated his life for farmers.
