= Nareshkumar Chunnalal Puglia =

Indian politician

Nareshkumar Puglia

Member of Parliament, Lok Sabha
- In office (1998-1999), (1999 – 2004)
- Preceded by: Hansraj Ahir
- Succeeded by: Hansraj Ahir
- Constituency: Chandrapur Lok Sabha

Member of Parliament, Rajya Sabha
- In office 05 July 1986 – 04 July 1992

Member of Maharashtra Legislative Assembly
- In office (1978-1980), (1980 – 1985)
- Preceded by: Adv. Eknathrao Salwe
- Succeeded by: Shyam Wankhede
- Constituency: Chandrapur Vidhan Sabha

Personal details
- Born: 20 May 1948 (age 78) Arvi, Wardha, Maharashtra
- Party: Indian National Congress
- Spouse: Sheeladevi Puglia (m. 1972)
- Website: www.nareshpagaria.in

Nareshkumar Chunnalal Puglia alias Babuji (born 20 May 1948) was a member of the 12th Lok Sabha and 13th Lok Sabha, the lower house of Parliament, from the Chandrapur constituency. He was elected as a member of the Indian National Congress.

On 30 November 1972, Naresh married Sheeladevi. He was a member of Rajya Sabha from Maharashtra State from 5 July 1986 to 4 July 1992.

== See also ==
- Chandrapur

Member of legislative Assembly from Maharashtra from Chandrapur constituency in 1978 & 1980-1985
