= Hansraj Gangaram Ahir =

Indian politician

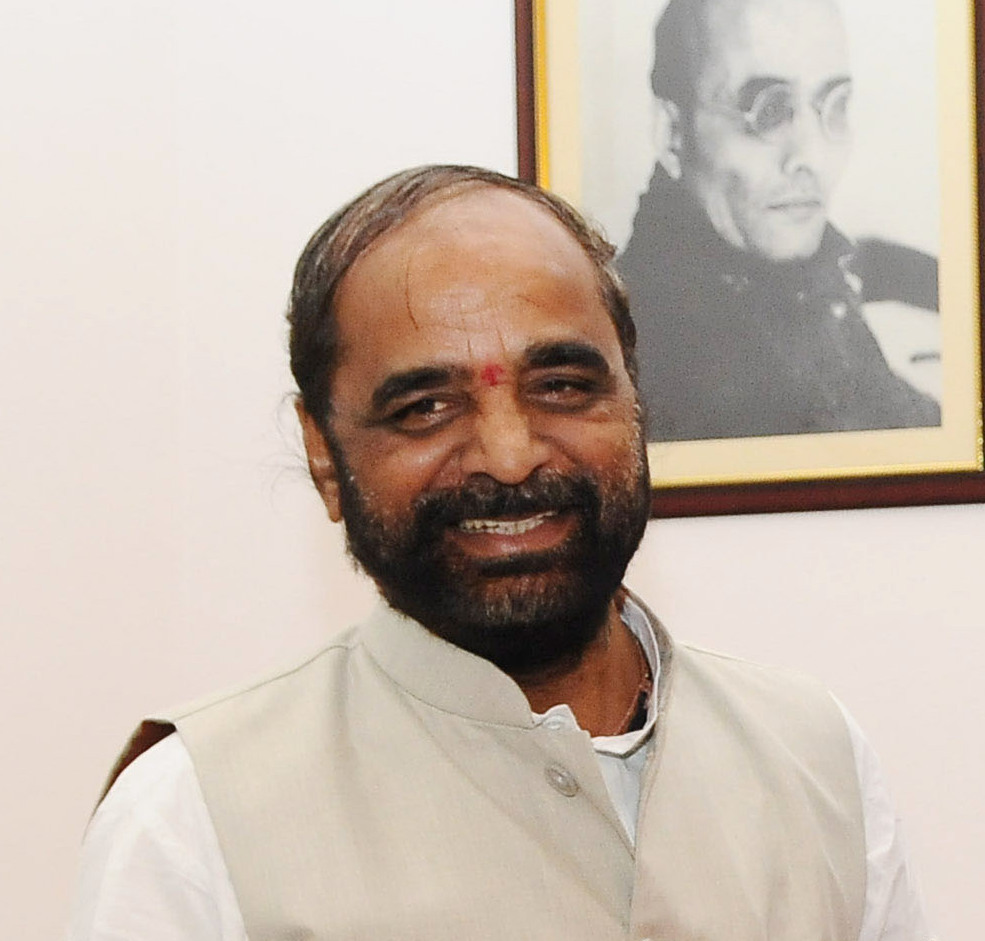

Chairman for National Commission for Backward Classes
- In office 2 December 2022 – 18 March 2026
- Preceded by: Bhagwan Lal Sahani
- Succeeded by: Sadhvi Niranjan Jyoti

Minister of State, for Home Affairs
- In office 5 July 2016 – 30 May 2019
- Prime Minister: Narendra Modi
- Minister: Rajnath Singh
- Preceded by: Haribhai Parthibhai Chaudhary
- Succeeded by: G Kishan Reddy; Nityanand Rai

MoS for Chemicals & Fertilizers
- In office 9 November 2014 – 5 July 2016
- Prime Minister: Narendra Modi
- Minister: Ananth Kumar
- Preceded by: Nihalchand
- Succeeded by: Mansukh Mandaviya

Member of Parliament, Lok Sabha
- In office 16 May 2004 – 23 May 2019
- Preceded by: Naresh Puglia
- Succeeded by: Suresh Dhanorkar
- Constituency: Chandrapur Lok Sabha constituency
- In office 10 May 1996 – 28 February 1998
- Preceded by: Shantaram Potdukhe
- Succeeded by: Naresh Puglia
- Constituency: Chandrapur Lok Sabha constituency

Member of Maharashtra Legislative Council
- In office 1994–1996
- Constituency: elected by Legislative Assembly members

Personal details
- Born: Hansraj Gangaram Ahir; 11 November 1954 (age 71) Nanded, Bombay State, India
- Spouse: Lata Ahir (m. 1990)
- Children: 3

Hansraj Gangaram Ahir is an Indian politician and former Chairman of the National Commission for Backward classes. He is a former Union Minister of State for Home Affairs and Minister of State for Chemicals and Fertilizers in the First Modi Ministry. He was the former member of the 16th Lok Sabha in India. He was member of 11th Lok Sabha, 14th Lok Sabha, 15th Lok Sabha. He is famous for exposing Coal Mining Scam specially pouni-3 in WCL.

Ahir frequently requested details of coal mining to Prime Minister of India office but he didn't succeed. Finally he (along with Prakash Javadekar) requested Central Vigilance Commission (CVC) for an inquiry. Based on this, CVC ordered a CBI inquiry.

He has been honoured with Sansad Ratna Award in 2010, 2011, 2012, 2013 and 2014.

== Political career ==
He represented the Chandrapur constituency of Maharashtra 4th time from Bharatiya Janata Party (BJP). He had been re-elected from the Chandrapur Lok Sabha Constituency as a member of the 15th Lok Sabha, the results of which were declared on 16 May 2009. In the 14th Lok Sabha, then Speaker Somnath Chatterjee had hailed Hansraj Gangaram Ahir, member of BJP from Chandrapur in Maharashtra as role model for MPs. Dr. APJ Abdul Kalam told Hansraj Ahir is no.1 Member of parliament and role model MP for youth.

== Achievements ==
Prime Point Foundation (PPF) has rated BJP MP from Chandrapur, Hansraj Ahir as the best parliamentarian for introduction of 24 private bills out of a total of 288 bills that were introduced so far in the 15th Lok Sabha and Shri Ahir was felicitated with Sansad Ratna Award. Indian Prime Minister Narendra Modi gave him a position in his cabinet as the Minister of State for Chemical & Fertilizers.

== Political career ==
=== Positions held ===
==== In Parliament ====
- 2004: Member, Committee on Coal & Steel
- 2004: Member, Committee on Food Management in Parliament House Complex
- 2004: Member, Committee on Agriculture
- 2 January 2006: Member, Joint Parliamentary Committee on Wakf
- 5 August 2007: Member, Standing Committee on Coal and Steel
- 31 August 2009: Member, Committee on Coal and Steel
- 23 September 2009: Member, Committee on Privileges
- 15 March 2010: Member, Railway Convention Committee
- 1 May 2013: Member, Committee on Public Undertakings
- 3 May 2013: Member, Committee on Welfare of Other Backward Classes (OBCs)
- 13 June 2014: onwards Member, Business Advisory Committee
- 1 September 2014 - 9 November 2014: Chairperson, Standing Committee on Coal and Steel
- Tobacco Board;
- Panchayati Raj Samiti;
- Rojgar Hami Yojana;
- Bhatkya Vimukta Jati Ashram Shala Samiti

==== Within BJP ====
- District President: Chandrapur (1991 to....)

==== Legislative ====
- Member, Maharashtra Legislative Council - 1994 to 1996
- 1996: First Elected to 11th Lok Sabha
- 2004: Re-elected to 14th Lok Sabha (2nd term)
- 2009: Re-elected to 15th Lok Sabha (3rd term)
- 2014: Re-elected to 16th Lok Sabha (4th term)
- 2019 Lost the Loksabha election to Balu (Suresh) Dhanorkar of Congress

== Countries Visited as Delegate Member ==
- With Hon. President of India visited countries Sweden and Belarus
- Mauritius, South Africa and U.A.E. as Member of Parliament.
