= Nanaji Sitaram Shamkule =

Member of Maharashtra Legislative Assembly
- In office (2009-2014), (2014 – 2019)
- Preceded by: Sudhir Mungantiwar
- Succeeded by: Kishor Jorgewar
- Constituency: Chandrapur

Personal details
- Born: 22 June 1949 (age 77)
- Party: Bhartiya Janta Party (2009-Present)

Nanaji Sitaram Shamkule is a member of the 13th Maharashtra Legislative Assembly. He represents the Chandrapur Assembly Constituency. He belongs to the Bharatiya Janata Party (BJP). In May, 2013 he was appointed President of BJP's Maharashtra state SC Cell. He was Member Legislative Assembly in 2009, also as a BJP member. Shamkule, before he became MLA in 2009, was a corporator in the Nagpur Municipal Corporation, from ward no 114, Takli Sim.
