= Sanjivreddy Bapurao Bodkurwar =

Indian politician

Sanjivreddy Bodkurwar

Member of the Maharashtra Legislative Assembly
- In office (2014 – 2019), (2019 – 2024)
- Preceded by: Wamanrao Bapurao Kasawar
- Succeeded by: Sanjay Derkar
- Constituency: Wani Assembly constituency

Personal details
- Born: 25 September 1964 (age 61) At.Wani, Yavatmal District
- Party: Bharatiya Janata Party
- Spouse: Lalita Bodkurwar
- Education: B.A. from Amravati University in 1988
- Occupation: Farmer; Social Worker

Sanjivreddy Bapurao Bodkurwar is a member of the 13th Maharashtra Legislative Assembly. He represents the Wani Assembly Constituency. He belongs to the Bharatiya Janata Party (BJP). Bodkurwar's victory was amongst the five seats won by the BJP, that resulted in the Indian National Congress (INC) not being able to win a single seat in Yavatmal district once its stronghold.
