= Shantaram Potdukhe =

Indian politician

- शांताराम पोटदुखे
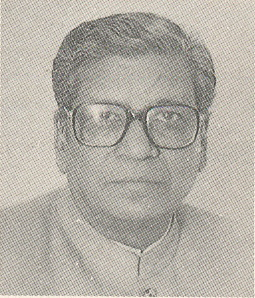

Union Minister of State, for Finance
- In office 21 June 1991 – 17 Jan 1993
- Prime Minister: P. V. Narasimha Rao
- Minister: Manmohan Singh
- Preceded by: Eduardo Faleiro
- Succeeded by: M. V. Chandrashekara Murthy

Member of Parliament, Lok Sabha
- In office Jan 1980 – May 1996
- Preceded by: Raje Vishveshvar Rao
- Succeeded by: Hansraj Gangaram Ahir
- Constituency: Chandrapur

Personal details
- Born: 30 January 1933 Chandrapur, Maharashtra, British India
- Died: 23 September 2018 (aged 85) Nagpur, Maharashtra, India
- Party: Indian National Congress
- Other political affiliations: none
- Spouse: Sudha
- Children: 1 son & 1 daughter
- Parent: Rajeshwar Paikaji Potdukhe (father)
- Education: Hislop College & Nagpur University
- Profession: Journalist, agriculturist & Politician
- Portfolio: Union Minister of State, Finance

Shantaram Rajeshwar Potdukhe (30 January 1933 – 23 September 2018) was an Indian politician and a Member of Parliament of India. Potdukhe was member of Lok Sabhas for four straight terms; 7th, 8th, 9th and 10th Lok Sabhas of India. He represented the Chandrapur constituency of Maharashtra and was a member of the Indian National Congress political party.

== Early life and education ==
Shantaram Potdukhe was born in Chandrapur, in the state of Maharashtra. He held BA and BJ degrees from Hislop College & Nagpur University respectively. After completing his education, Potdukhe worked as a journalist.

== Political career ==
Shantaram Potdukhe joined Congress (I) and contested elections in 1980. He defeated Raje Vishveshvar Rao who was a member of the 6th Lok Sabha. Potdukhe was re-elected to three subsequent terms from the same constituency and party. During his term as Member of Parliament, Potdukhe held position of Union Minister of State and was also member of several committees.

== Posts held ==
#	From	To	Position
01	1980	1984	Member, 07th Lok Sabha
02	1984	1989	Member, 08th Lok Sabha
03	1985	1989	Member, Consultative Committee, Ministry of Information & Broadcasting
04	1985	1989	Member, Consultative Committee, MoCA
05	1985	1989	Member, Consultative Committee, Ministry of Tourism
06	1985	1989	Member, Consultative Committee, Ministry of Science & Technology
07	1985	1989	Member, Consultative Committee, Ministry of Ocean Development
08	1985	1989	Member, Consultative Committee, Ministry of Space
09	1989	1991	Member, 09th Lok Sabha
10	1990	1991	Member, Rules Committee
11	1990	1991	Member, Consultative Committee, Department of Atomic Energy
12	1990	1991	Member, Consultative Committee, Ministry of Science & Technology
13	1990	1991	Member, Consultative Committee, Ministry of Ocean Development
14	1990	1991	Member, Consultative Committee, Ministry of Space
15	1990	1991	Member, Consultative Committee, Department of Electronics
16	1991	1996	Member, 10th Lok Sabha
17	1991	1996	Union Minister of State, Finance

== See also ==
- 7th, 8th, 9th & 10th Lok Sabha
- Lok Sabha
- Politics of India
- Parliament of India
- Government of India
- Indian National Congress
- Chandrapur
