= Raju Narayan Todsam =

Indian politician

- राजू नारायण तोडसाम

Member of the Maharashtra Legislative Assembly
- Incumbent
- Assumed office 23 November 2024
- Preceded by: Sandip Prabhakar Dhurve
- Constituency: Arni

Member of the Maharashtra Legislative Assembly
- In office 2014–2019
- Preceded by: Shivajirao Moghe
- Succeeded by: Sandip Prabhakar Dhurve

Personal details
- Party: Bharatiya Janata Party
- Other political affiliations: Nationalist Congress Party (2021–2023); Bharat Rashtra Samithi (2023–2024)
- Education: M.A., Amravati University (2001); B.Ed., Nagpur University (2004)
- Occupation: Farmer and politician

Raju Narayan Todsam is an Indian politician and farmer who has represented the Arni constituency, a Scheduled Tribes–reserved seat in Maharashtra’s Yavatmal district, in the Maharashtra Legislative Assembly. A member of the Bharatiya Janata Party (BJP), he served from 2014 to 2019 and returned to the assembly after winning the seat again in 2024. His current term began on 23 November 2024.

== Early life and education ==
Todsam is the son of Narayan Pandu Todsam. His 2024 election affidavit records his age as 49 and describes his occupation as farming. The affidavit states that he earned a Master of Arts degree from Amravati University in 2001 and a Bachelor of Education degree from Nagpur University in 2004.

== Political career ==
Todsam contested the Arni seat as an independent candidate in the 2009 Maharashtra Legislative Assembly election but was unsuccessful.

In the 2014 election, Tosdam contested Arni as the BJP candidate. He received 86,991 votes and defeated Indian National Congress candidate Shivajirao Moghe, who received 66,270 votes. Todsam’s winning margin was 20,721 votes.

The BJP did not nominate Todsam for the constituency in the 2019 election. He consequently contested as an independent, receiving 26,949 votes and finishing third. BJP candidate Sandip Prabhakar Dhurve won the seat with 81,599 votes, narrowly defeating Moghe of the Congress.

Todsam joined the Nationalist Congress Party (NCP) in November 2021. His induction took place in the presence of Maharashtra NCP president Jayant Patil and Member of Parliament Supriya Sule.

In February 2023, while serving as president of the NCP’s Maharashtra tribal wing, he joined the Bharat Rashtra Samithi at a public meeting addressed by the party’s leader, K. Chandrashekar Rao, in Nanded.

Todsam returned to the BJP in October 2024 and was selected as its candidate for Arni. In the 2024 Maharashtra Legislative Assembly election, he received 127,203 votes and defeated Congress candidate Jitendra Shivaji Moghe, who received 97,890 votes. His winning margin was 29,313 votes.

== Legal proceedings ==
In November 2015, a judicial magistrate convicted Todsam of offences arising from a 2013 confrontation with an employee of the Maharashtra State Electricity Distribution Company Limited. He received concurrent three-month prison sentences and fines. An additional sessions judge upheld the conviction in January 2021.

Later that month, the Nagpur Bench of the Bombay High Court admitted Todsam’s criminal-revision application, suspended the custodial sentence while the revision was pending and ordered his release on bail subject to the stated conditions.

In his 2024 election affidavit, Todsam declared six criminal cases. Affidavit disclosures represent information submitted by the candidate and do not, by themselves, establish guilt in cases that have not resulted in a final conviction.

== Electoral history ==
Year	Constituency	Party	Votes	Result
2009	Arni	Independent	5,530	Lost
2014	Arni	Bharatiya Janata Party	86,991	Won
2019	Arni	Independent	26,949	Lost
2024	Arni	Bharatiya Janata Party	127,203	Won
