= Wamanrao Bapurao Kasawar =

Indian politician

Wamanrao Kasawar

Member of the Maharashtra Legislative Assembly
- In office (1990-1995),(1995-1999),(1999-2004),(2009 – 2014)
- Preceded by: Namdeorao Narayanrao Kale
- Succeeded by: Vishwas Ramchandra Nandekar; Sanjivreddi Bapurao Bodkurwar
- Constituency: Wani Assembly constituency

Personal details
- Born: 24 January 1949 (age 77) At.Patan, Tq.Zari Jamani, Yavatmal District
- Party: Indian National Congress
- Education: Graduate B.A., from Nagpur University, Year - 1970; Nagpur University
- Occupation: Farmer & Politician

Wamanrao Bapurao Kasawar is an Indian politician. He was elected to the Maharashtra Legislative Assembly from Wani, Maharashtra in 1990 until 2014 as a member of the Indian National Congress.
