= Shivajirao Moghe =

Indian politician

Adv. Shivajirao Moghe

Working President of Maharashtra Pradesh Congress Committee
- Incumbent
- Assumed office 5 February 2021

President of All India Adivasi Congress
- In office 14 July 2022 – 11 February 2025
- Succeeded by: Vikrant Bhuria

Member of Maharashtra Legislative Assembly
- In office (1980–1985),(1985-1990),(1995-1999),(1999-2004),(2009 – 2014)
- Preceded by: Masram Lakhuji Marotrao
- Succeeded by: Deorao Jaitaji Gedam; Raju Narayan Todsam; Sandip Prabhakar Dhurve
- Constituency: Arni-Kelapur

Cabinet Minister Government of Maharashtra
- In office 19 October 1999 – 16 January 2003
- Minister: Transport & Employment Guarantee
- Constituency: Arni-Kelapur

Cabinet Minister Government of Maharashtra
- In office 18 January 2003 – 1 November 2004
- Minister: Employment Guarantee, Tourism and Water Resources
- Preceded by: Radhakrishna Vikhe Patil
- Succeeded by: Vinay Kore

Cabinet Minister Government of Maharashtra
- In office 7 November 2009 – 10 November 2010
- Minister: Social Justice, Other Backward Classes, Special Backward classes welfare and Nomadic Tribes
- Preceded by: Chandrakant Handore

Guardian Minister of Wardha District
- In office (18 Oct 1999 – 16 Jan 2003)

Guardian Minister of Yavatmal District
- In office (18 Jan 2003 – 4 Nov 2004)

Guardian Minister of Nagpur District
- In office (2009-2010),(2010 – 2014)

Personal details
- Born: Adv. Shivajirao Shivaramji Moghe; 27 March 1945 (age 81) Yavatmal District
- Party: Indian National Congress
- Children: Jitendra Shivajirao Moghe
- Relatives: Santosh Kautika Tarfe (Son-in-Law)
- Education: Post Graduate M.Com Nagpur Vidyapith Year-1968, L.L.B Nagpur Vidyapith Year-1973
- Occupation: Business and agriculture

Adv. Shivajirao Shivaramji Moghe is an Indian politician. He is the Indian National Congress Party member of the Maharashtra Legislative Assembly representing Arni, Yavatmal. Adv. Shivajirao Moghe is a senior from Maharashtra and is a committed tribal leader.

He was earlier elected as Member of Legislative Assembly of Maharashtra for Kelapur in 1980, 1985, 1999 & 2009 as Indian National Congress candidate and 1995 as Independent.
