= Rajoli =

Coordinates: 20°40′N 80°16′E

Rajoli was an estate situated at Sakoli tahsil in the District Of Bhandara in the Indian state of Maharashtra.
