= Subhash Dhote =

Indian politician

Member of the Maharashtra Legislative Assembly
- In office 26 November 2019 – 2024
- Preceded by: Sanjay Dhote
- Succeeded by: Deorao Bhongle
- Constituency: Rajura

Personal details
- Citizenship: Indian
- Party: Indian National Congress
- Relations: Married
- Occupation: Politician

Subhash Ramchandrarao Dhote is an Indian politician from Maharashtra and a member of the Indian National Congress in 2009 and 2019. He was elected as a member of the Maharashtra Legislative Assembly from Rajura.

== Early life and political career ==
Subhash Dhote was elected a member of the Maharashtra Legislative Assembly in 2009 and the Indian National Congress. In 2019 he was elected as a member of the Maharashtra Legislative Assembly from Rajura (Assembly constituency), Government of Maharashtra in MVA.
