= Gondwana University =

University in Gadchiroli city of Maharastra, India

Coordinates: 20.172825°N 79.972427°E

- Motto: Sanskrit: ज्ञानदेव तू कैवल्यम, romanized: "Through knowledge one attains liberation"
- Type: Government
- Established: 2012 (14 years ago)
- Affiliations: UGC, NAAC, AIU
- Chancellor: Governor of Maharashtra
- Vice-Chancellor: Prashant Bokare
- Location: Gadchiroli, Maharashtra, India
- Campus: Urban
- Website: unigug.ac.in

Gondwana University is a university established in 2011 in the city of Gadchiroli in Maharashtra state in central India. It is named after Gondwana region in central India.

== History ==
On July 23, 2010, Maharashtra Legislative Assembly passed a unanimous resolution to constitute the Gondwana University, for the area comprising districts of Chandrapur and Gadchiroli . The resolution was moved by then Higher and Technical Education Minister Rajesh Tope. The new university was constituted by issuing notification under sub-section (2) of section 3 of the Maharashtra Universities Act, 1994. On 27 September 2011, Gondwana University was carved out of RTMNU, Nagpur. The official inauguration date was delayed until August 2012.

== Jurisdiction ==
The university has jurisdiction over districts of Chandrapur and Gadchiroli in eastern Maharashtra.

== Campus ==
The university has its campus in Gadchiroli city.

== Faculties and Departments ==
The university has faculties of Arts, Science, Law, Social Science, Commerce, Home Science, Education and Medicine.

Departments

1. Department of Computer
2. Department of Management
3. Department of Traditional
4. Department of Science
5. Department of Engineering
6. Department of Paramedical
7. Department of Vocational
8. Department of Education
9. Department of Commerce
10. Department of Research

== Affiliations ==
Its jurisdiction extends over 2 districts- Chandrapur, Gadricholi. There are a total of 236 colleges affiliated to the university.

The prominent colleges affiliated to the university are

1. Government College of Engineering, Chandrapur,
2. Sardar Patel Mahavidyalaya, Chandrapur and
3. Janata Mahavidyalaya, Chandrapur.

== Vice chancellors ==
1. Vijay Ainchwar (2011-2013)
2. Shri. Ranjit Kumar IAS Collector and Vice-Chancellor (Acting)
3. Prof. Kirtiwardhan Dixit (Acting)
4. Dr. Murlidhar Chandekar (Acting)
5. Dr. Namdeo Venkatrao Kalyankar (2015-2020)
6. Dr. Srinivas Varkhedi (2020 - 9th Dec 2021)
7. Dr. Prashant S Bokare (10th Dec 2021 to till date)
