= Burud (caste) =

People belonging to Hindu Or Lingayat Burud Caste or Maratha are mostly native of Maharashtra & Karnataka (India). Burud is derived from a Sanskrit word "Buruda". Buruda in Sanskrit means "a basket-maker, mat-maker". People of this caste are recognized by their traditional occupation of bamboo crafting. In the old days, Buruds (people belonging to the Burud Caste) were dependent on bamboo crafting for their livelihood. They used bamboo to prepare different articles like mats, ladders, baskets. With increase in population and growing popularity of plastic/metallic articles, bamboo-based livelihood is no more viable. Now days Buruds becoming more Educated and doing good Jobs in government & private sector.

There are two sects of Buruds. One is Hindu Burud and another is lingayat Burud.

Hindu Burud all rituals are identical to Hindu Maratha. Even Some People belong to Maratha Caste with Maratha Surnames.

All Lingayats bury in soil (daffan) their dead body.

As against cremation (Aggnidaaha) among Hindus and so on.

Because of there is No historical caste leader, saint, or personality in Burud Caste. That's why, Some Karnataka side Buruds looks towards their caste leader to kaittya Swami who accepted basav Raj's, lingayat teachings that worship only linga, not gods & murti (idols)
