= Sandip Prabhakar Dhurve =

Indian politician (b.1966)

Dr. Sandip Dhurve

Member of Maharashtra Legislative Assembly
- In office (2004-2009), (2019 – 2024)
- Preceded by: Adv.Shivajirao Moghe
- Succeeded by: Adv.Shivajirao Moghe
- Constituency: Arni-Kelapur

Personal details
- Born: 22 October 1968 (age 57) At.Arni, Yavatmal District
- Party: Bharatiya Janata Party
- Other political affiliations: Shivsena
- Spouse: Vijyasinh Dhurve
- Education: MBBS from Nagpur University, Government Medical College in 1991
- Occupation: Social Work & Politician

Sandip Prabhakar Dhurve (born 25 October 1966) is a Bharatiya Janata Party politician and Member of Legislative Assembly from Arni (ST) constituency. He is nephew of former Indian National Congress leader & MLA of Ralegaon Sudhakarrao Bakaramji Dhurve.

== Political Life ==
Sandeep Prabhakar Dhurve, a doctor by profession, started his political career in 2004. He defeated Shivajirao Moghe, a strong Congress leader and former minister from Kelapur (ST) (now Arni) assembly constituency. He was nominated by the Bharatiya Janata Party. In 2014, when the Bharatiya Janata Party rejected his candidature, he contested the elections on the Shiv Sena's candidature. He was defeated. In 2019, BJP once again nominated him. This time too, he defeated former minister Shivajirao Moghe and BJP rebel former MLA Raju Todsam. He was denied BJP ticket in 2024.

== Education ==
MBBS from Nagpur University, Government Medical College in 1991.
