= Karan Sanjay Deotale =

Indian politician

Karan Sanjay Deotale (born 1995) is an Indian politician from Maharashtra. He is an MLA from Warora Assembly constituency in Chandrapur district. He won the 2024 Maharashtra Legislative Assembly election representing the Bharatiya Janata Party.

== Early life and education ==
Deotale is from Warora, Chandrapur district, Maharashtra. He is the son of senior leader of Indian National Congress party and former four time MLA, Sanjay Wamanrao Deotale. He completed his BE civil at Yashwantrao Chavan College of Engineering, Nagpur, which is under Nagpur University, and later did MBA at Shrimati Leena Keshore Mamidvar Institute of Management and Research, Chandrapur, which is affiliated with Godhvana University Gadhchiroli in 2021.

== Political career ==
Karan deotale family were Member and close to Indian National Congress Party before switching to Bharatiya Janata Party but Karan became a member of the Rashtriya Swayamsevak Sangh (RSS), a far-right Hindu nationalist paramilitary volunteer organisation and won from Warora Assembly constituency representing the Bharatiya Janata Party in the 2024 Maharashtra Legislative Assembly election. He polled 65,170 votes and defeated his nearest rival, Mukesh Manoj Jiwtode, an independent candidate, by a margin of 15,450 votes.
