= Chandrapur, Maharashtra Assembly constituency =

Constituency of the Maharashtra legislative assembly in India

Coordinates: 19.97°N 79.29°E

Chandrapur
- Constituency No. 71 for the Maharashtra Legislative Assembly
- Kishore Jorgewar, present MLA of Chandrapur

Constituency details
- Country: India
- Region: Western India
- State: Maharashtra
- District: Chandrapur
- Lok Sabha constituency: Chandrapur
- Established: 1976
- Total electors: 374,360
- Reservation: SC

Member of Legislative Assembly
- 15th Maharashtra Legislative Assembly
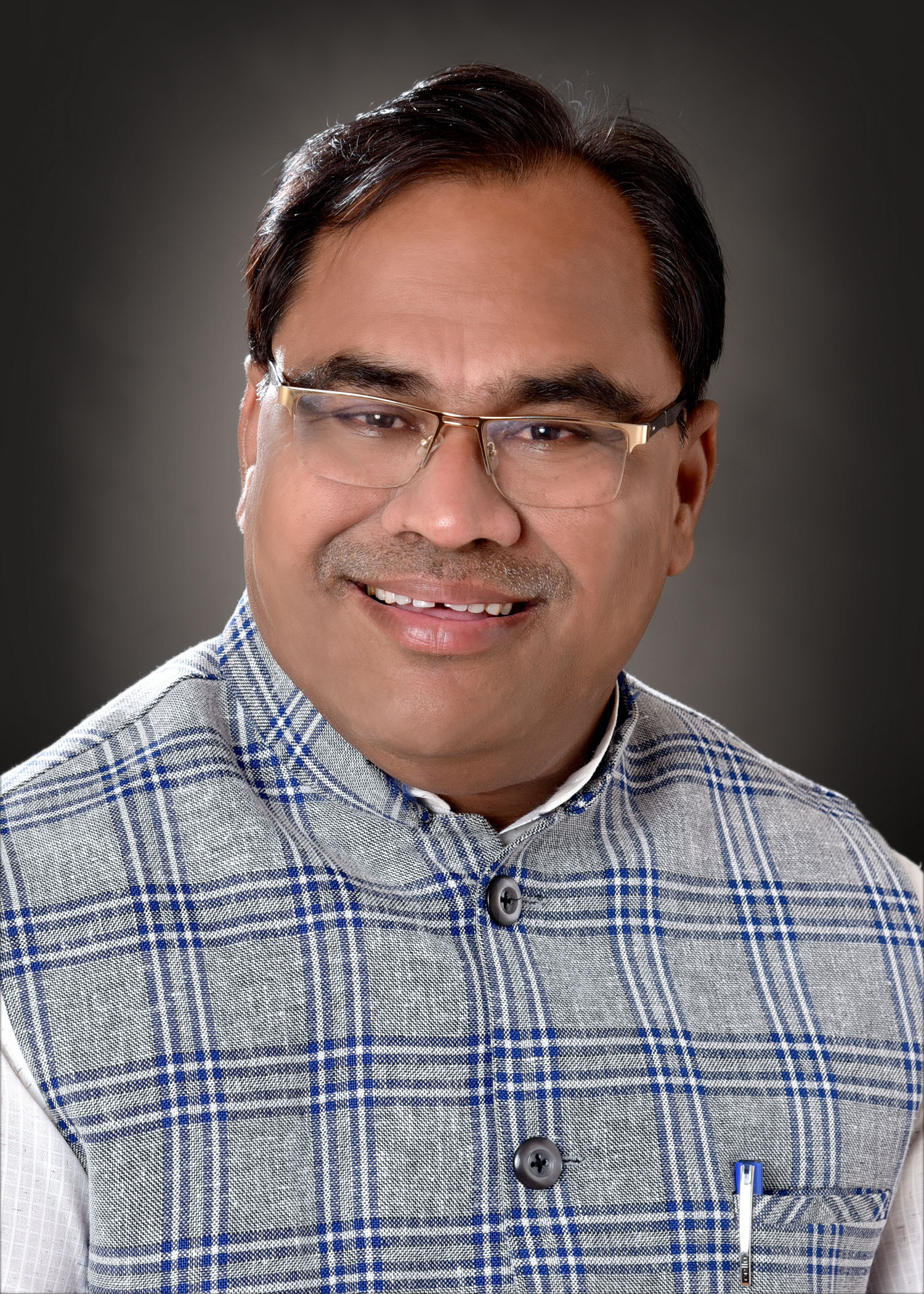
- Incumbent Kishore Jorgewar
- Party: BJP
- Alliance: NDA
- Elected year: 2024

Chandrapur Assembly constituency is one of the 288 Vidhan Sabha (legislative assembly) constituencies of Maharashtra state, western India. This constituency is located in Chandrapur district. The delimitation of the constituency happened in 2008.

== Geographical scope ==
The constituency comprises parts of Chandrapur taluka viz. Ghugus revenue circle and Chandrapur Municipal Corporation.

== Members of the Legislative Assembly ==
Election	Member	Party
1952	Laxmanrao Krishnaji Wasekar	Indian National Congress
1957	Laxmanrao Krishnaji Wasekar	Indian National Congress
1962	Ramchandrarao Rajeshwarrao Potdukhe	Independent politician
1967	Adv. Eknathrao Salwe	Indian National Congress
1972	Adv. Eknathrao Salwe	Indian National Congress
1978 onwards : Name changes to Chandrapur
1978	Nareshkumar Puglia	Indian National Congress (I)
1980	Nareshkumar Puglia	Indian National Congress (I)
1985	Shyam Gopalrao Wankhede	Indian National Congress
1990	Shyam Gopalrao Wankhede	Indian National Congress
1995	Sudhir Mungantiwar	Bharatiya Janata Party
1999	Sudhir Mungantiwar	Bharatiya Janata Party
2004	Sudhir Mungantiwar	Bharatiya Janata Party
2009	Nanaji Shamkule	Bharatiya Janata Party
2014	Nanaji Shamkule	Bharatiya Janata Party
2019	Kishor Jorgewar	Independent
2024	Kishor Jorgewar	Bharatiya Janata Party

Madhya Pradesh
Bombay State

== Election results ==
=== Assembly Election 2024 ===
2024 Maharashtra Legislative Assembly election : Chandrapur
Party	Candidate	Votes	%	±%
BJP	Kishor Gajanan Jorgewar	106,841	49.17%	▲26.85
INC	Pravin Nanaji Padwekar	84,037	38.68%	▲31.58
Independent	Brijbhushan Mahadeo Pazare	14,598	6.72%	New
Independent	Raju Chinnayya Zode	5,711	2.63%	New
NOTA	None of the Above	2,255	1.04%	▲0.18
BSP	Manoj Gopichand Lade	1,891	0.87%	▼0.01
Margin of victory		22,804	10.50%	▼25.63
Turnout		2,19,523	58.64%	▲7.26
Total valid votes		2,17,268		
Registered electors		3,74,360		▼5.49
BJP gain from Independent		Swing	▼9.28	

=== Assembly Election 2019 ===
2019 Maharashtra Legislative Assembly election : Chandrapur
Party	Candidate	Votes	%	±%
Independent	Kishor Gajanan Jorgewar	117,570	58.46%	New
BJP	Nanaji Sitaram Shamkule	44,909	22.33%	▼19.92
VBA	Anirudha Dhonduji Wankar	15,403	7.66%	New
INC	Mahesh Marotrao Mendhe	14,284	7.10%	▼5.93
Peoples Party of India (Democratic)	Namdeo Atmaram Gedam	3,956	1.97%	New
BSP	Bhikkhu S. Buddhasharan	1,772	0.88%	▼3.45
NOTA	None of the Above	1,730	0.86%	▼0.19
Margin of victory		72,661	36.13%	▲20.17
Turnout		2,03,694	51.42%	▼3.06
Total valid votes		2,01,119		
Registered electors		3,96,117		▲10.57
Independent gain from BJP		Swing	▲16.21	

=== Assembly Election 2014 ===
2014 Maharashtra Legislative Assembly election : Chandrapur
Party	Candidate	Votes	%	±%
BJP	Nanaji Sitaram Shamkule	81,483	42.25%	▼1.89
SS	Kishor Gajanan Jorgewar	50,711	26.29%	New
INC	Mahesh Marotrao Mendhe	25,140	13.03%	▼20.99
BBM	Anirudha Dhonduji Wankar	14,683	7.61%	▲5.08
BSP	Ankalesh Natthuji Khaire	8,357	4.33%	▼4.88
NCP	Ashok Namdeorao Nagpure	7,459	3.87%	New
NOTA	None of the Above	2,026	1.05%	New
Independent	Nalboga Chinnaji Bhimayya	1,698	0.88%	New
Margin of victory		30,772	15.96%	▲5.84
Turnout		1,95,115	54.46%	▲3.82
Total valid votes		1,92,866		
Registered electors		3,58,250		▲17.59
BJP hold		Swing	▼1.89	

=== Assembly Election 2009 ===
2009 Maharashtra Legislative Assembly election : Chandrapur
Party	Candidate	Votes	%	±%
BJP	Nanaji Sitaram Shamkule	67,255	44.14%	▼5.86
INC	Bita Ghansham Ramteke	51,845	34.02%	▼1.66
BSP	Tanuja Dewaji Khobragade	14,035	9.21%	▲3.20
BBM	Deshak Girish Khobragade	3,865	2.54%	▼0.17
RPI(A)	Pravin Hemchandra Khobragade	3,012	1.98%	New
Independent	Dhanraj Harishchandra Sawarkar	2,021	1.33%	New
Independent	Patkotwar Prabhakar Govindrao	1,897	1.24%	New
Margin of victory		15,410	10.11%	▼4.19
Turnout		1,52,444	50.04%	▼11.70
Total valid votes		1,52,376		
Registered electors		3,04,673		▲0.00
BJP hold		Swing	▼5.86	

=== Assembly Election 2004 ===
2004 Maharashtra Legislative Assembly election : Chandrapur
Party	Candidate	Votes	%	±%
BJP	Sudhir Sachchidanand Mungantiwar	94,003	49.99%	▼1.51
INC	Gajanan Balaji Gawande (Guruji)	67,102	35.69%	▲2.78
BSP	Adv. Nandkishor Mandlik	11,311	6.02%	New
BBM	Bharat Somaji Thulkar	5,091	2.71%	New
Independent	Sonpimpale Shatrughan Vyankatrao (Patrakar)	2,613	1.39%	New
Independent	Meshram Vinod Dinanath	2,044	1.09%	New
Shivrajya Party	Dhote Parshuram Alias Baliraj	1,490	0.79%	New
Margin of victory		26,901	14.31%	▼4.29
Turnout		1,88,696	61.93%	▲3.79
Total valid votes		1,88,025		
Registered electors		3,04,673		▲7.33
BJP hold		Swing	▼1.51	

=== Assembly Election 1999 ===
1999 Maharashtra Legislative Assembly election : Chandrapur
Party	Candidate	Votes	%	±%
BJP	Sudhir Sachchidanand Mungantiwar	84,688	51.51%	▲2.85
INC	Vinayak Baburao Bangade	54,109	32.91%	▲12.33
Independent	Deepak Shankarlal Jaiswal	22,251	13.53%	New
Independent	Adv. Vijay Ganpatrao Mogare	1,836	1.12%	New
Margin of victory		30,579	18.60%	▼9.48
Turnout		1,69,165	59.59%	▼14.43
Total valid votes		1,64,417		
Registered electors		2,83,868		▲5.89
BJP hold		Swing	▲2.85	

=== Assembly Election 1995 ===
1995 Maharashtra Legislative Assembly election : Chandrapur
Party	Candidate	Votes	%	±%
BJP	Sudhir Sachchidanand Mungantiwar	94,379	48.66%	New
INC	Shyam Gopalrao Wankhede	39,915	20.58%	▼22.79
JD	Rajakhan Maheboobkhan	29,167	15.04%	New
BSP	Rajkumar Udaybhan Tirpude	6,832	3.52%	▲2.66
RPI(K)	Jayant Pandurang Padwekar	6,449	3.32%	▼13.60
Independent	Vinayak Baburao Bangade	6,182	3.19%	New
BBM	Wamanrao Raghobaji Bankar	2,478	1.28%	New
Margin of victory		54,464	28.08%	▲3.49
Turnout		1,96,693	73.37%	▲13.33
Total valid votes		1,93,956		
Registered electors		2,68,087		▲19.09
BJP gain from INC		Swing	▲5.29	

=== Assembly Election 1990 ===
1990 Maharashtra Legislative Assembly election : Chandrapur
Party	Candidate	Votes	%	±%
INC	Shyam Gopalrao Wankhede	57,622	43.37%	▼9.26
Independent	Gayacharam Mahaviraprasad Trivedi	24,947	18.78%	New
RPI(K)	Jayant Pandurang Padwekar	22,486	16.93%	▼12.16
SS	Dilip Ramchandra Potdukhe	12,653	9.52%	New
CPI	Ganpat Govindrao Amrutkar	8,949	6.74%	New
BSP	Deorao Kawduji Kolhe	1,148	0.86%	New
Independent	Kumre Udhao Raghoba	1,074	0.81%	New
Margin of victory		32,675	24.59%	▲1.05
Turnout		1,34,561	59.78%	▼0.03
Total valid votes		1,32,853		
Registered electors		2,25,110		▲42.48
INC hold		Swing	▼9.26	

=== Assembly Election 1985 ===
1985 Maharashtra Legislative Assembly election : Chandrapur
Party	Candidate	Votes	%	±%
INC	Shyam Gopalrao Wankhede	49,099	52.63%	New
RPI(K)	Girish Dewaji Khobragade	27,133	29.09%	▲24.03
BJP	Chandansingh Sadhusinh Chandel	14,870	15.94%	▼9.44
Independent	Gulab Panurang Rajukar	695	0.75%	New
Margin of victory		21,966	23.55%	▲4.53
Turnout		94,776	59.99%	▲9.41
Total valid votes		93,283		
Registered electors		1,57,989		▲19.86
INC gain from INC(I)		Swing	▲8.23	

=== Assembly Election 1980 ===
1980 Maharashtra Legislative Assembly election : Chandrapur
Party	Candidate	Votes	%	±%
INC(I)	Nareshkumar Chunnalal Puglia	29,048	44.40%	▼3.04
BJP	Chandansinh Sadhusinh Chandel	16,606	25.38%	New
INC(U)	Datta Pandhare	8,708	13.31%	New
CPI	Ganpat Govindrao Amrutkar	6,355	9.71%	▼1.67
RPI(K)	Sayyad Majherbhai	3,309	5.06%	▼25.96
Independent	Thakre Madhao Balajipant	774	1.18%	New
Margin of victory		12,442	19.02%	▲2.60
Turnout		66,665	50.58%	▼18.79
Total valid votes		65,419		
Registered electors		1,31,810		▲12.54
INC(I) hold		Swing	▼3.04	

=== Assembly Election 1978 ===
1978 Maharashtra Legislative Assembly election : Chandrapur
Party	Candidate	Votes	%	±%
INC(I)	Nareshkumar Chunnalal Puglia	38,018	47.44%	New
RPI(K)	Rajaram Tulsiram Dumbere	24,857	31.02%	New
CPI	Ganpat Govindrao Amrutkar	9,124	11.39%	New
INC	Eknath Salve	4,739	5.91%	New
Independent	Madhao Balaji Thakre	893	1.11%	New
Independent	Lahamage Vishwas Ramrao	760	0.95%	New
Margin of victory		13,161	16.42%	
Turnout		82,225	70.20%	
Total valid votes		80,140		
Registered electors		1,17,124		
INC(I) win (new seat)				
