= Swatantra Bharat Paksh =

- Leader: Sharad Anantrao Joshi, Wamanrao Chatap
- Secretary: Wamanrao Chatap
- Rajya Sabha Leader: Sharad Anantrao Joshi
- Founded: 1994
- Preceded by: Sharad Anantrao Joshi
- Headquarters: A-4, Purnam Center Point, Opp. Gaikwad Class, Kahneri Wadi CBS, District Nashik
- Ideology: Conservative liberalism
- Lok Sabha: 0 / 543
- Rajya Sabha: 0 / 245

Website
- swatantra.org.in

The Swatantra Bharat Paksh (translation: Independent India Party; abbr. SBP) is a liberal political party in Maharashtra, India, established in 1994 by Sharad Anantrao Joshi (former Shetkari Sanghatana leader). It claims its roots in the Swatantra Party of C. Rajagopalachari. It won one seat in the 2004 Maharashtra Vidhan Sabha election, successfully contested by Wamanrao Chatap from the Rajura constituency. In total, the party had launched 7 candidates. Sharad Anantrao Joshi, the party's founder, represented the party and Maharasthra in the Rajya Sabha from 2004 to 2010.

The party was allied with the Bharatiya Janata Party as well as the Shiv Sena. The party supports the demand for a separate Vidarbha state.

On 28 March 2022, the SBP merged with the Swarna Bharat Party and became the Swatantra Bharat Party.
