= Warora Assembly constituency =

Coordinates: 20.24°N 79.02°E

Warora
- Constituency No. 75 for the Maharashtra Legislative Assembly

Constituency details
- Country: India
- Region: Western India
- State: Maharashtra
- District: Chandrapur
- Lok Sabha constituency: Chandrapur
- Established: 2008
- Total electors: 282,473
- Reservation: None

Member of Legislative Assembly
- 15th Maharashtra Legislative Assembly
- Incumbent Karan Sanjay Deotale
- Party: BJP
- Alliance: NDA
- Elected year: 2024

Warora Assembly constituency is one of the six constituencies of the Maharashtra Legislative Assembly located in the Chandrapur district. It was created after the passing of the Delimitation of Parliamentary and Assembly Constituencies Order, 2008. It is a part of Chandrapur Lok Sabha constituency along with five other assembly constituencies, namely Rajura, Ballapur and Chandrapur (SC) from Chandrapur district and Wani and Arni from the neighbouring Yavatmal district.

== Members of Legislative Assembly ==
Year	Member	Party
1962	Dadasaheb alias Ramchandra Janardhan Deotale	Indian National Congress
1967	Dadasaheb alias Ramchandra Janardhan Deotale	Indian National Congress
1972	Dadasaheb alias Ramchandra Janardhan Deotale	Indian National Congress
1978	Nilkanthrao Yeshwantrao Shinde	Indian National Congress (I)
1980	Dadasaheb alias Ramchandra Janardhan Deotale	Indian National Congress (I)
1985	Moreshwar Vithalrao Temurde	Independent politician
1990	Moreshwar Vithalrao Temurde	Janata Dal
1995	Sanjay Wamanrao Deotale	Indian National Congress
1999	Sanjay Wamanrao Deotale	Indian National Congress
2004	Sanjay Wamanrao Deotale	Indian National Congress
Before 2008: See Bhadrawati Assembly constituency
2009	Sanjay Wamanrao Deotale	Indian National Congress
2014	Suresh Dhanorkar	Shiv Sena
2019	Pratibha Dhanorkar	Indian National Congress
2024	Karan Deotale	Bharatiya Janata Party

== Election results ==
=== Assembly Election 2024 ===
2024 Maharashtra Legislative Assembly election : Warora
Party	Candidate	Votes	%	±%
BJP	Karan Sanjay Deotale	65,170	33.03%	New
Independent	Mukesh Manoj Jiwtode	49,720	25.20%	New
INC	Kakde Pravin Suresh	25,048	12.70%	▼22.13
PHJSP	Ahetesham Sadakat Ali	20,723	10.50%	New
Independent	Raju Maroti Gaikwad	13,482	6.83%	New
VBA	Anil Narayan Dhanorkar	9,123	4.62%	▼1.56
Independent	Dr. Chetan Gajanan Khutemate	5,151	2.61%	New
NOTA	None of the Above	1,059	0.54%	▼0.68
Margin of victory		15,450	7.83%	▲2.27
Turnout		198,353	70.22%	▲7.44
Total valid votes		197,294		
Registered electors		282,473		▼4.76
BJP gain from INC		Swing	▼1.79	

=== Assembly Election 2019 ===
2019 Maharashtra Legislative Assembly election : Warora
Party	Candidate	Votes	%	±%
INC	Pratibha Dhanorkar	63,862	34.82%	▲17.68
SS	Sanjay Wamanrao Deotale	53,665	29.26%	▼0.49
MNS	Ramesh Mahadeo Rajurkar	34,848	19.00%	▲14.59
VBA	Amol Dilip Bawane	11,342	6.18%	New
GGP	Ramesh Kawduji Meshram	6,388	3.48%	New
Independent	Dr. Vijay Ramchandra Deotale	6,127	3.34%	New
NOTA	None of the Above	2,224	1.21%	▲0.40
BSP	Prashant Bhauraoji Bhadgare	1,999	1.09%	▼9.27
Margin of victory		10,197	5.56%	▲4.45
Turnout		186,187	62.78%	▼2.15
Total valid votes		183,399		
Registered electors		296,588		▲6.35
INC gain from SS		Swing	▲5.07	

=== Assembly Election 2014 ===
2014 Maharashtra Legislative Assembly election : Warora
Party	Candidate	Votes	%	±%
SS	Suresh Dhanorkar	53,877	29.76%	▼1.10
BJP	Sanjay Wamanrao Deotale	51,873	28.65%	New
INC	Dr.Asawari Vijay Deotale	31,033	17.14%	▼16.12
BSP	Adv. Bhupendra Wamanrao Raipure	18,759	10.36%	▲5.68
MNS	Dr. Anil Laxmanrao Bujone	7,981	4.41%	▲2.58
NCP	Jayant Moreshwar Temurde	4,720	2.61%	New
Independent	Dinesh Shivram Padhal	2,214	1.22%	New
NOTA	None of the Above	1,476	0.82%	New
Margin of victory		2,004	1.11%	▼1.29
Turnout		182,661	65.50%	▲0.98
Total valid votes		181,063		
Registered electors		278,891		▲14.27
SS gain from INC		Swing	▼3.50	

=== Assembly Election 2009 ===
2009 Maharashtra Legislative Assembly election : Warora
Party	Candidate	Votes	%	±%
INC	Deotale Sanjay Wamanrao	51,904	33.26%	New
SS	Suresh Dhanorkar	48,164	30.86%	New
Independent	Dr. Anil Laxmanrao Bujone	30,982	19.85%	New
BSP	Raju Bharat Deogade	7,304	4.68%	New
Independent	Rupeshkumar Arjun Ghagi (Sir)	2,992	1.92%	New
MNS	Kombe Dattatray Gajananrao	2,855	1.83%	New
Independent	Hitesh Rajeshwar Rajanhire	2,483	1.59%	New
Margin of victory		3,740	2.40%	
Turnout		156,107	63.96%	
Total valid votes		156,069		
Registered electors		244,059		
INC win (new seat)				

== See also ==
- Chandrapur district
- List of constituencies of Maharashtra Legislative Assembly
