= Electric boat =

Type of watercraft

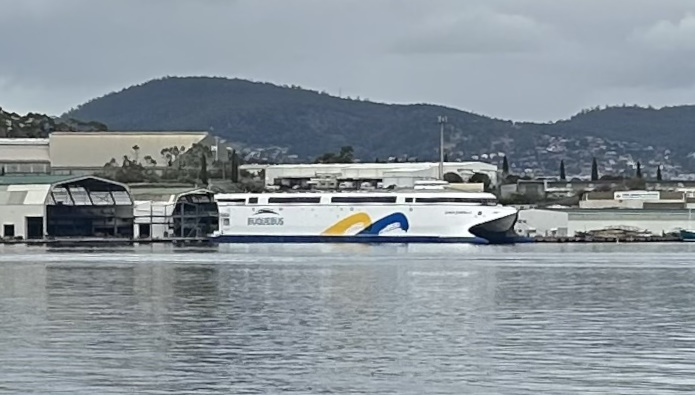
Built in 2025, China Zorrilla is the largest battery electric ship ever built, it measures 130 m (425 ft) in length and is designed to carry up to 2,100 passengers and 225 vehicles across the Rio de la Plata.

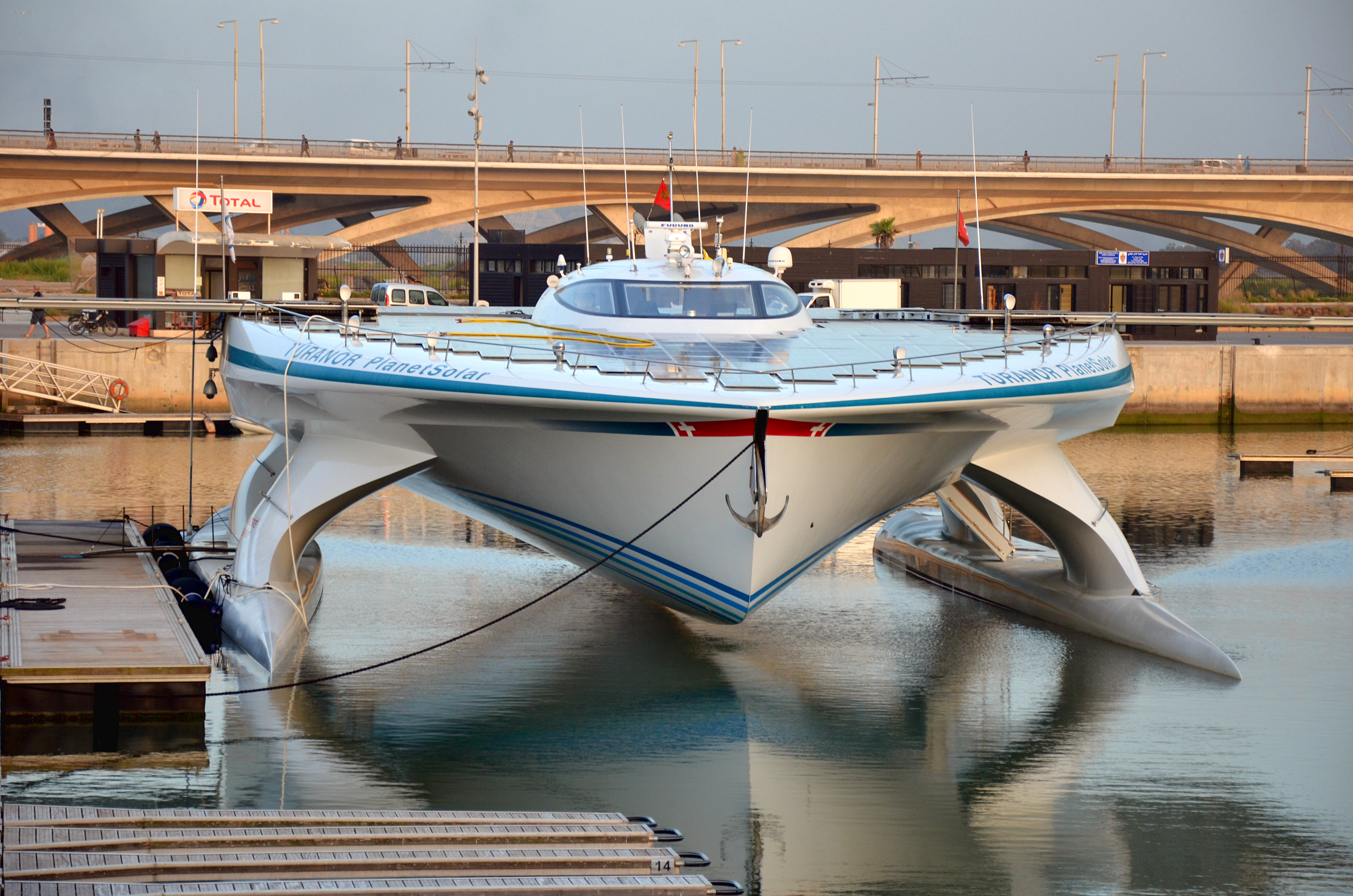
In 2012, PlanetSolar became the first ever solar electric vehicle to circumnavigate the globe.

An electric boat is a watercraft driven by electric motors that are powered by on-board battery packs or solar panels.

While a significant majority of water vessels are powered by diesel engines, with sail power and gasoline engines also popular, boats powered by electricity have been used for over 120 years. Electric boats were very popular from the 1880s until the 1920s, when the internal combustion engine became dominant. Since the energy crises of the 1970s, interest in electric boats has been increasing steadily, especially as more efficient solar cells have become available, for the first time making possible motorboats with a theoretically infinite cruise range like sailboats. The first practical solar boat was probably constructed in 1975 in England. The first electric sailboat to complete a round-the-world tour (including a transit of the Panama Canal) using only green technology is EcoSailingProject.

One of the main benefits of shifting to electric boats apart from environmental benefit is the low cost of operation. The spread between diesel and electric depends on fuel cost and grid cost in a region.

== History ==
=== Early ===
An early electric boat was developed by the German inventor Moritz von Jacobi in 1839 in St Petersburg, Russia. It was a 24-foot (7.3 m) boat which carried 14 passengers at 3 miles per hour (4.8 km/h). It was successfully demonstrated to Emperor Nicholas I of Russia on the Neva River.

=== Golden Age ===
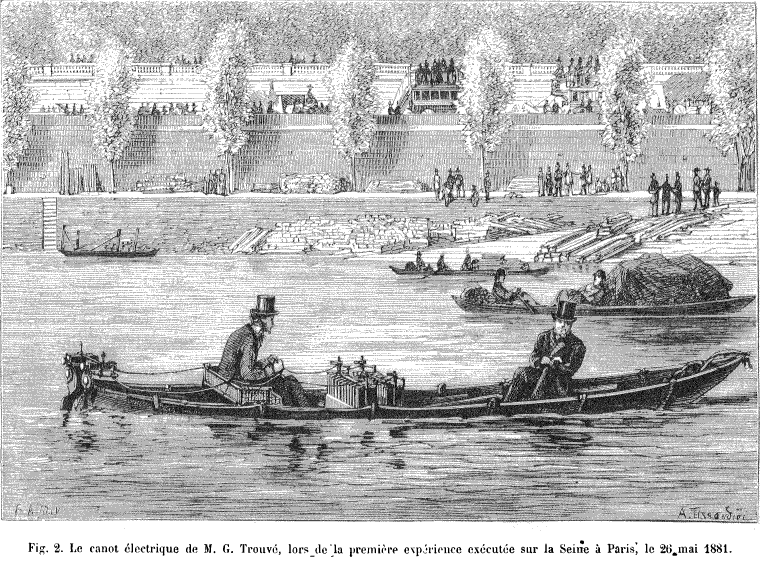
Outboard motorboat of Gustave Trouvé in 1881

Electric motor designed by Immisch & Co., who established the first fleet of electric launches in London

Early electric launch on the River Thames, built by William Sargeant

It took more than 30 years of battery and motor development before the electric boat became a practical proposition. This method of propulsion enjoyed something of a golden age from about 1880 to 1920, when gasoline-powered outboard motors became the dominant method. Gustave Trouvé, a French electrical engineer, patented a small electric motor in 1880. He initially suggested that the motor could power a set of paddle wheels to propel boats on the water, and later argued for the use of a propeller.

An Austrian émigré to Britain, Anthony Reckenzaun, was instrumental in the development of the first practical electric boats. While working as an engineer for the Electrical Power Storage Company, he undertook much original and pioneering work on various forms of electric traction. In 1882 he designed the first significant electric launch driven by storage batteries, and named the boat Electricity. The boat had a steel hull. It was about 7.9 m (26 ft) long, with a beam of about 1.5 m (5 ft) and a draught of about 610 mm (2 ft). It was fitted with a 560 mm (22 in) diameter propeller. The batteries and electric equipment were hidden from view beneath the seating area, increasing the space available for the accommodation of passengers. The boats were used for leisure excursions up and down the River Thames and provided a very smooth, clean and quiet trip. The boat could run for six hours and operate at an average speed of 13 km/h (8 mph).

Moritz Immisch established his company in 1882 in partnership with William Keppel, 7th Earl of Albemarle, specializing in the application of electric motors to transportation. The company employed Magnus Volk as a manager in the development of their electric launch department. After 12 months of experimental work starting in 1888 with a randan skiff, the firm commissioned the construction of hulls which they equipped with electrical apparatus. The world's first fleet of electric launches for hire, with a chain of electrical charging stations, was established along the River Thames in the 1880s. An 1893 pleasure map of the Thames shows eight "charging stations for electric launches" between Kew (Strand-on-the-Green) and Reading (Caversham). The company built its headquarters on the island called Platt's Eyot.

From 1889 until just before the First World War the boating season and regattas saw the silent electric boats plying their way up and downstream.

The company's electric launches were widely used by the rich as a conveyance along the river. Grand ships were constructed of teak or mahogany and furnished luxuriously, with stained glass windows, silk curtains and velvet cushions. William Sargeant was commissioned by Immisch's company to build the Mary Gordon in 1898 for Leeds City Council for use on the Roundhay Park Lake – the boat still survives and is currently being restored. This 70-foot long luxury pleasure craft could carry up to 75 passengers in comfort. Launches were exported elsewhere – they were used in the Lake District and all over the world.

In the 1893 Chicago World Fair 55 launches developed from Anthony Reckenzaun's work carried more than a million passengers. Electric boats had an early period of popularity between around 1890 and 1920, before the emergence of the internal combustion engine drove them out of most applications.

Most of the electric boats of this era were small passenger boats on non-tidal waters at a time when the only power alternative was steam.

=== Decline ===
With the advent of the gasoline-powered outboard motor, the use of electric power on boats declined from the 1920s. However, in a few situations, the use of electric boats has persisted from the early 20th century to the present day. One of these is on the Königssee lake, near Berchtesgaden in south-eastern Germany. Here the lake is considered so environmentally sensitive that steam and motor boats have been prohibited since 1909. Instead the Bayerische Seenschifffahrt company and its predecessors have operated a fleet of electric launches to provide a public passenger service on the lake.

The first electrically powered submarines were built in the 1890s, such as the Spanish Peral submarine, launched in 1888. Since then, electric power has been used almost exclusively for the powering of submarines underwater (traditionally by batteries), although diesel was used for directly powering the propeller while on the surface until the development of diesel–electric transmission by the US Navy in 1928, in which the propeller was always powered by an electric motor, energy coming from batteries while submerged or diesel generator while surfaced.

The use of combined fuel and electric propulsion (combined diesel–electric or gas, or CODLOG) has gradually been extended over the years to the extent that some modern liners such as the Queen Mary 2 use only electric motors for the actual propulsion, powered by diesel and gas turbine engines. The advantages include being able to run the fuel engines at an optimal speed at all times and being able to mount the electric motor in a pod which may be rotated by 360° for increased manoeuvrability. Note that this is not actually an electric boat, but rather a variant of diesel–electric or turbine–electric propulsion, similar to the diesel or electric propulsion used on submarines since WWI.

=== Renaissance ===
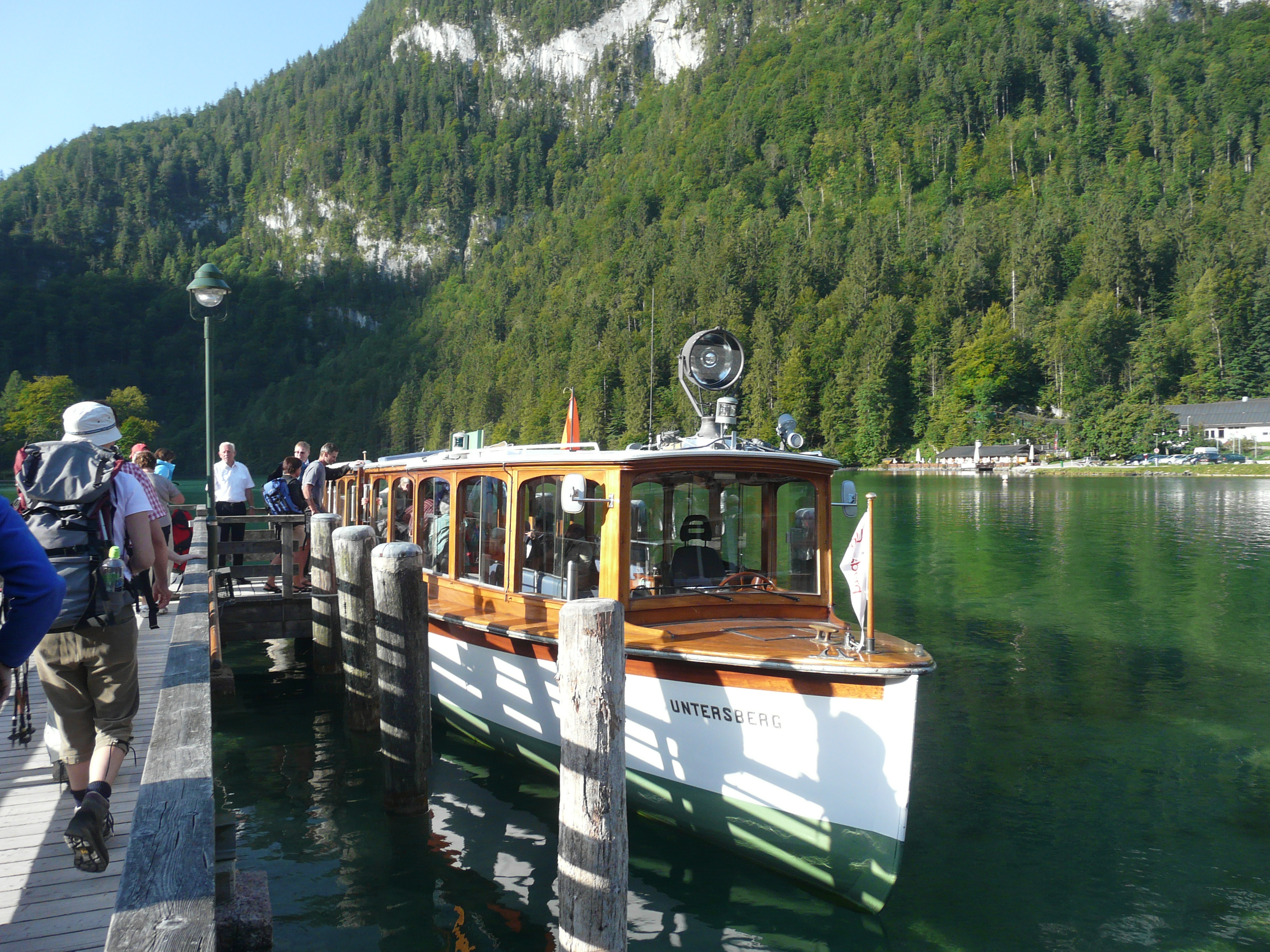
An electric passenger launch on Lake Königssee in Germany

The use of electricity alone to power boats stagnated apart from their outboard use as trolling motors until the Duffy Electric Boat Company of California started mass-producing small electric craft in 1968. It was not until 1982 that the Electric Boat Association was formed and solar powered boats started to emerge. To reduce friction and increase range, some boats use hydrofoils. The eWolf tugboat that launched in March 2024 has a 6.2 megawatt-hour main propulsion battery and two electric drives and is more powerful than the diesel tugboats at the port.

==== Ferries ====
A 2021 study compared traditional diesel ferries to battery electric ferries, and found higher build cost for the e-ferry, but lower operating cost (including 2 or 3 battery replacements), resulting in lower total cost for 30-year operation. However, this was very dependant on route length (and ship size and speed), as batteries are only suitable for short routes.

The harbour buses in Copenhagen were switched to 7 electricity-only boats in 2021, each with a 180 kWh battery.

In 2023, electric-powered hybrid boats began to be widely adopted in India as a mode of urban transport, supplementing metro rail systems by utilizing rivers and other waterways. The Kochi Water Metro was the first project to be deployed with electric ferries. As of 2025, its fleet consists of 19 electric boats, all built by Cochin Shipyard. Each vessel has a passenger capacity of around 100 and is capable of cruising at speeds of up to 10 knots. It uses 300 kW chargers which can charge the boat within 15 minutes.

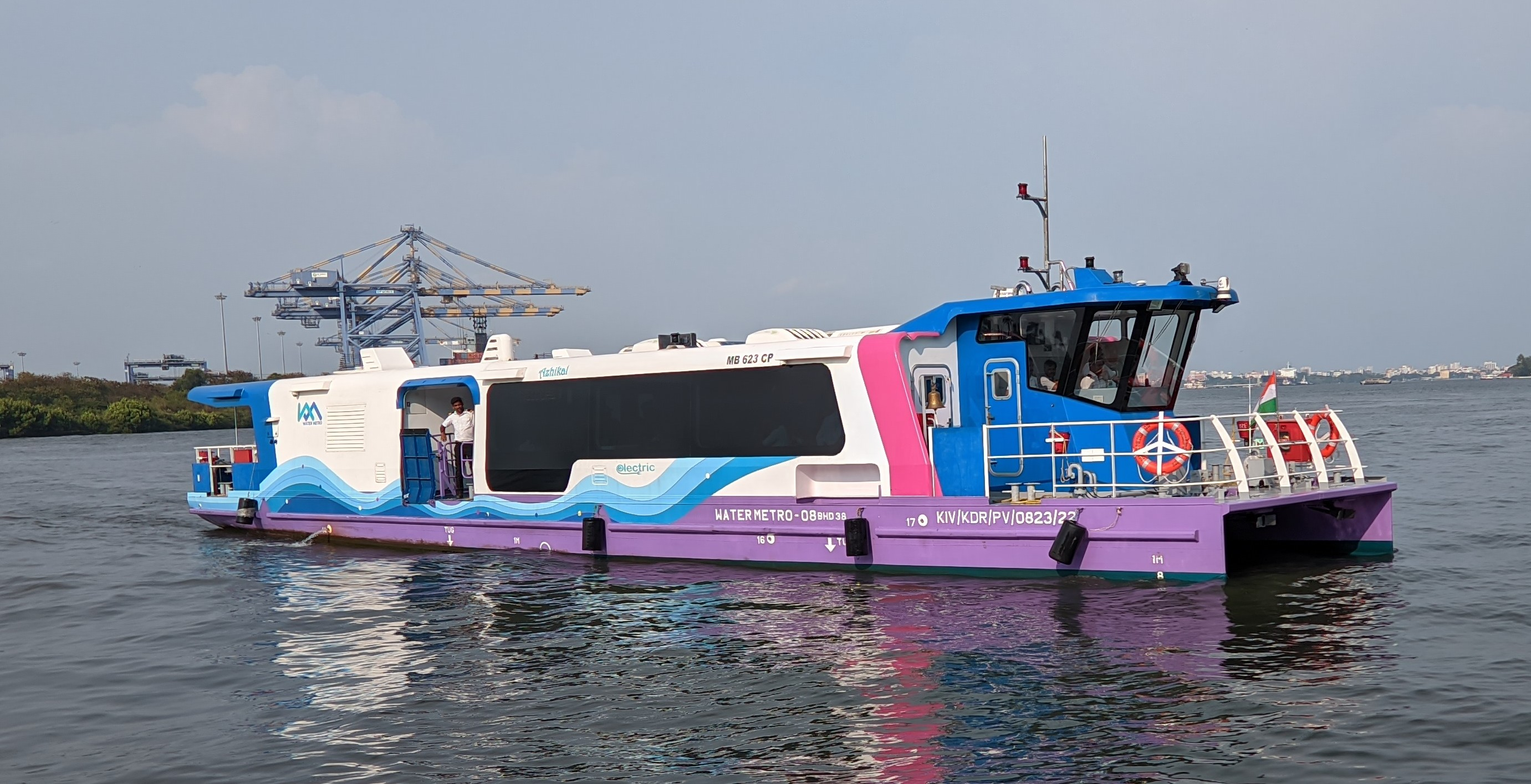
Kochi water metro is an electric powered hybrid ferry in india build by Cochin Shipyard

Following the successful operation of the Kochi Water Metro, the model was replicated in other Indian cities. As of 2025, similar electric ferry services are operational in Patna and Ayodhya, with projects under implementation in a total of 21 Indian cities.

Incat Tasmania's China Zorrilla ferry operates 90 minutes per trip as a ferry in South America, carrying up to 2,100 people and 225 cars, between charges in each port. It has a 40 megawatt-hour battery, in 12 battery arrays with 418 modules apiece, weighing 250 tonnes. The battery is air cooled with fans for each module. The batteries power eight axial-flow water jets driven by permanent magnet electric motors.

== Components ==
The main components of the drive system of any electrically powered boat are similar in all cases, and similar to the options available for any electric vehicle.

=== Charger ===
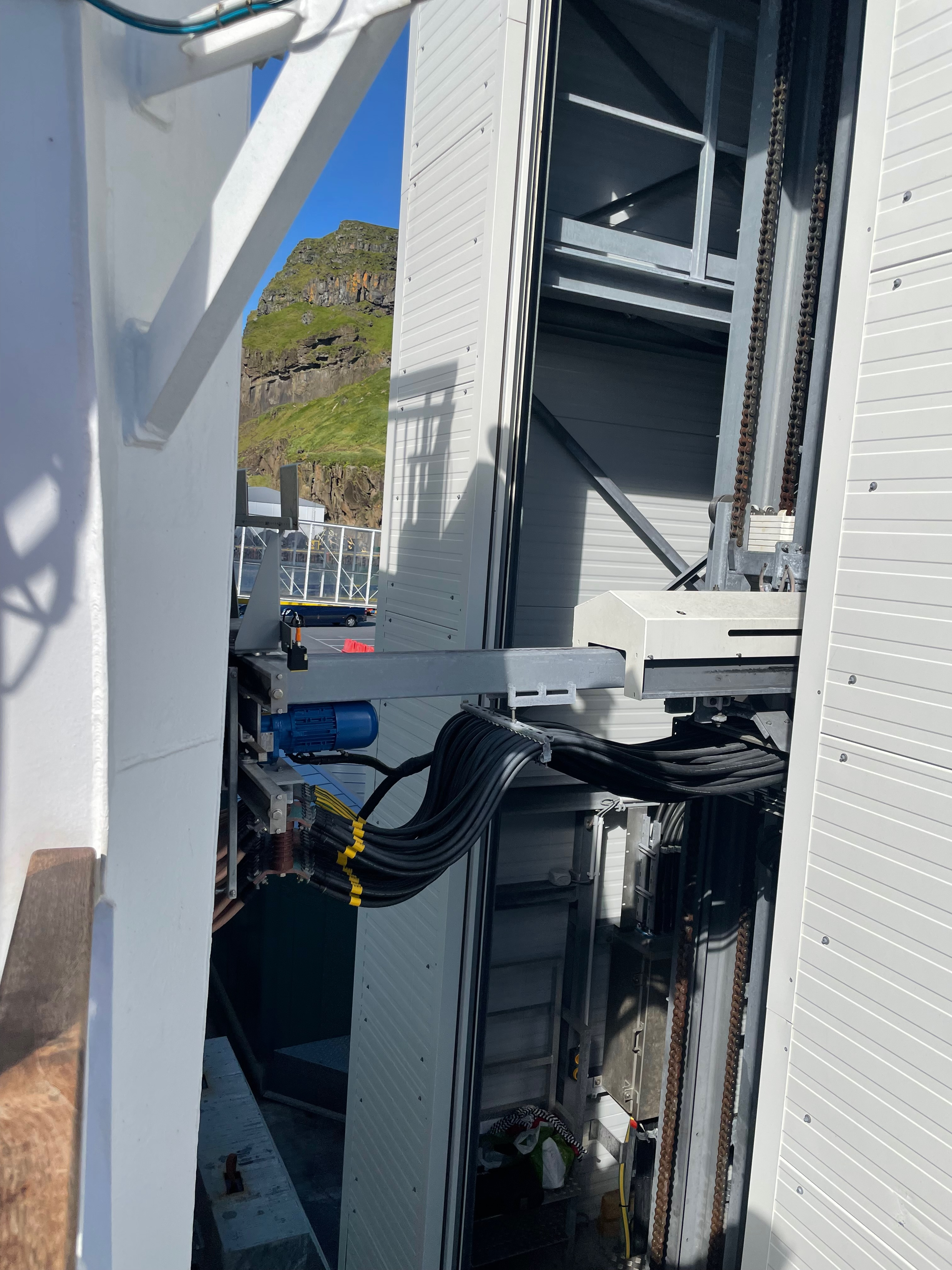
2.5 MW Automatic coupling robot charger for the Herjólfur Ferry in Iceland

Electric energy has to be obtained for the battery bank from some source like the sun.

- A mains charger allows the boat to be charged from shore-side power when available. Shore-based power stations are subject to much stricter environmental controls than the average marine diesel or outboard motor. By purchasing green electricity it is possible to operate electric boats using sustainable or renewable energy. For large vessels, an onshore battery may be necessary to provide more short-term power than the grid can supply.
- Solar panels can be built into the boat in reasonable areas in the deck, cabin roof or as awnings. Some solar panels, or photovoltaic arrays, can be flexible enough to fit to slightly curved surfaces and can be ordered in unusual shapes and sizes. Nonetheless, the heavier, rigid mono-crystalline types are more efficient in terms of energy output per square meter. The efficiency of solar panels rapidly decreases when they are not pointed directly at the sun, so some way of tilting the arrays while under way is very advantageous.
- Towed generators are common on long-distance cruising yachts and can generate a lot of power when travelling under sail. If an electric boat has sails as well, and will be used in deep water (deeper than about 15 m or 50 ft), then a towed generator can help build up battery charge while sailing (there is no point in trailing such a generator while under electric propulsion as the extra drag from the generator would waste more electricity than it generates). Some electric power systems use the free-wheeling drive propeller to generate charge through the drive motor when sailing, but this system, including the design of the propeller and any gearing, cannot be optimised for both functions. It may be better locked off or feathered while the towed generator's more efficient turbine gathers energy.
- Wind turbines are common on cruising yachts and can be very well suited to electric boats. There are safety considerations regarding the spinning blades, especially in a strong wind. It is important that the boat is big enough that the turbine can be mounted out of the way of all passengers and crew under all circumstances, including when alongside a dock, a bank or a pier. It is also important that the boat is big enough and stable enough that the top hamper created by the turbine on its pole or mast does not compromise its stability in a strong wind or gale. Large enough wind generators could produce a completely wind-powered electric boat. No such boats are yet known although a few mechanical wind turbine powered boats exist.
- In hybrid electric boats, if a boat has an internal combustion engine anyway, then its alternator will provide significant charge when it is running. Two schemes are in use: the combustion engine and the electric motor are both coupled to the drive (parallel hybrid), or the combustion engine drives a generator only for charging the storage batteries (series hybrid).

In all cases, a charge regulator is needed. This ensures that the batteries are charged at their maximum safe rate when power is available, without overheating or internal damage, and that they are not overcharged when nearing full charge.

An alternative to charging is changing batteries while in port. It offers the benefit of removing the need to wait for the recharging to complete before sailing. This approach has the potential to allow ships and ferries with tight schedules to be electrified as charging can be done in port with no time limitations.

=== Battery bank ===
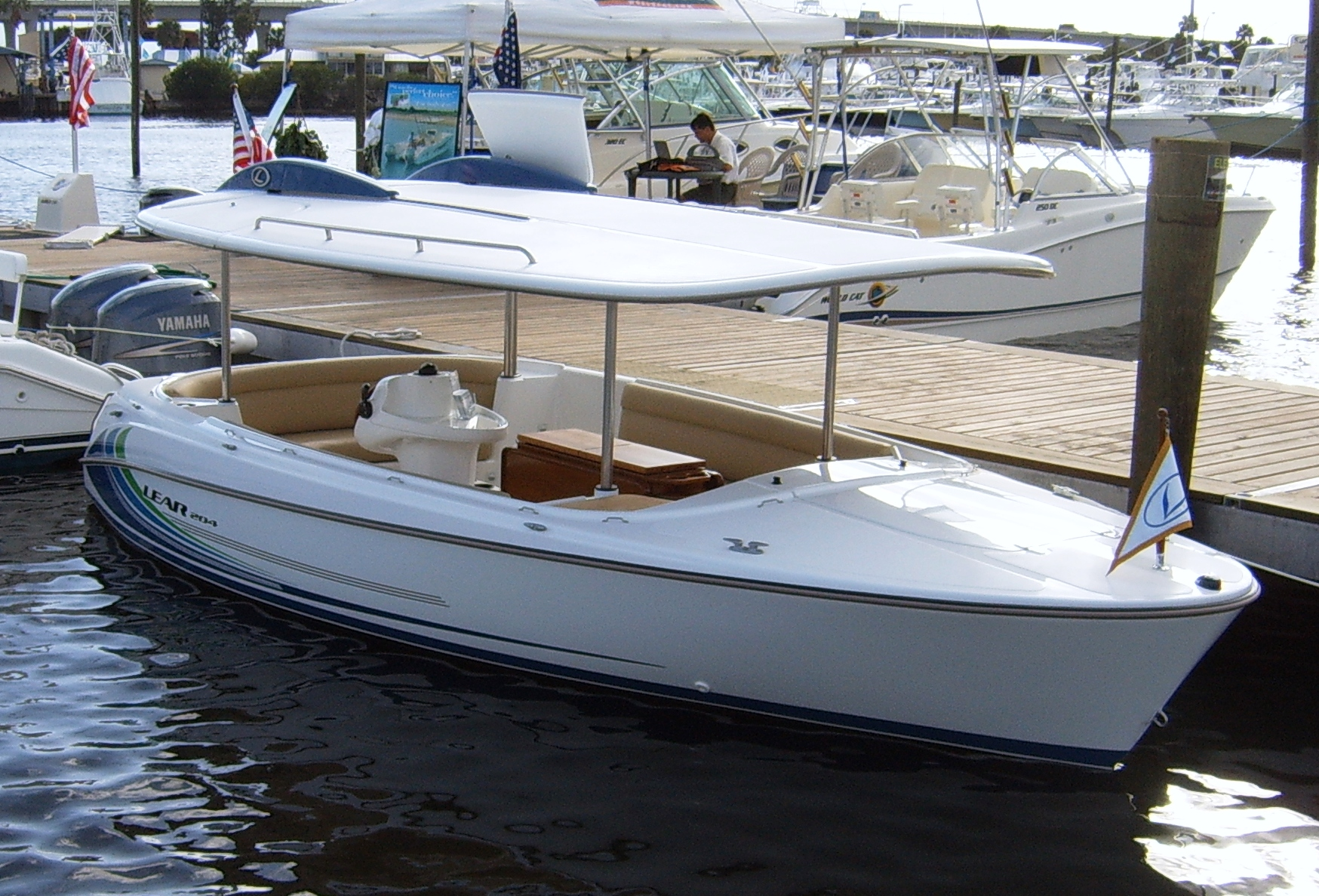
Example of a modern production electric boat

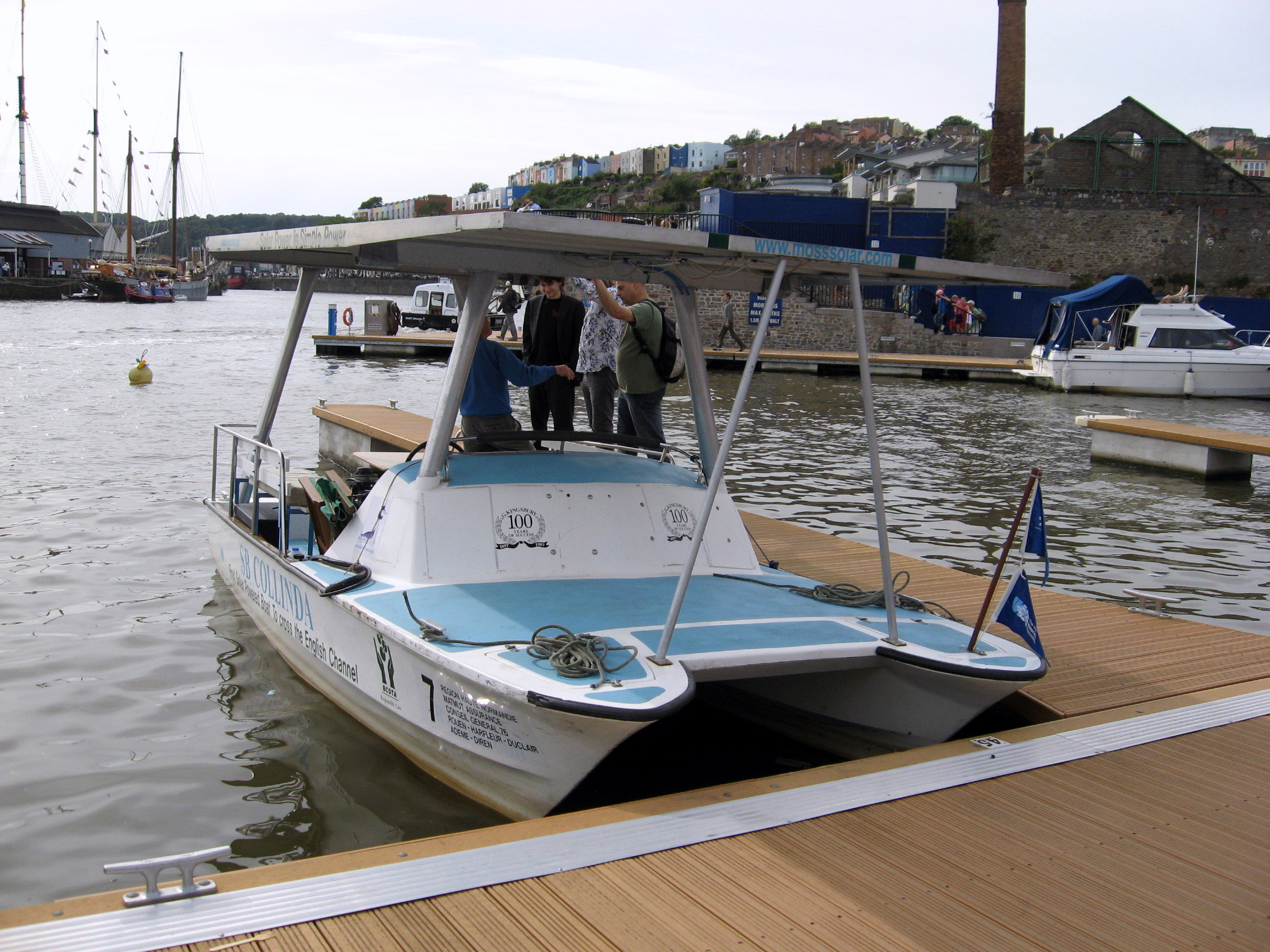
SB Collinda, the first solar-powered boat to cross the English Channel, seen here in Bristol Harbour

There have been significant technical advances in battery technology in recent years, and more are to be expected in the future.

- Lead–acid batteries were still the most viable option until the advent of larger, lithium-ion batteries mass-produced for electric cars from approximately 2012 onwards. Deep-cycle, 'traction' batteries are the obvious choice. They are heavy and bulky, but not much more so than the diesel engine, tanks and fittings that they may replace. They need to be securely mounted, low down and centrally situated in the boat. It is essential that they cannot move around under any circumstances. Care must be taken that there is no risk of the strong acid being spilled in the event of a capsize as this could be very dangerous. Venting of explosive hydrogen and oxygen gases is also necessary. Typical lead–acid batteries must be kept topped-up with distilled water.
- Valve-regulated lead–acid batteries (VRLA), usually known as sealed lead–acid, gel, or AGM batteries, minimize the risk of spillage, and gases are only vented when the batteries are overcharged. These batteries require minimal maintenance, as they cannot and usually do not need to be refilled with water.
- Nickel metal hydride, lithium-ion and other battery types are becoming available, but are still expensive. These are the kind of batteries currently common in rechargeable hand tools like drills and screwdrivers, but they are relatively new to this environment. They require different charge controllers to those that suit lead–acid types.
- Lithium-ion in this case usually means lithium iron phosphate batteries, which although are heavier than other lithium-ion, is safer for marine application. They are expensive but in applications which need reliability and ruggedness like ferries which run most of the day (10–12 hours/day) this is the best option. It has a much longer life – 5 to 7 years life-cycle.
- Fuel cells or flow batteries may provide significant advantages in years to come. Today (2017) however they are still expensive and require specialist equipment and knowledge.

Among the various battery chemistry the choice between a fast charging (LTO, NMC etc.) versus slow charging (LFP) is decided by economic analysis considering Capital expenditure (CAPEX), Operating expense (OPEX), Total cost of Ownership (TCO). It is observed that for higher energy need because of high speed or large weight with intermitted charging is an area where fast charging batteries become more economical.

The size of the battery bank determines the range of the boat under electric power. The speed at which the boat is motored also affects range – a lower speed can make a big difference to the energy required to move a hull. Other factors that affect range include sea-state, currents, windage and any charge that can be reclaimed while under way, for example by solar panels in full sun. A wind turbine in a good wind will help, and motor-sailing in any wind could do so even more.

=== Speed controller ===
To make the boat usable and manoeuvrable, a simple-to-operate forward/stop/backwards speed controller is needed. This must be efficient—i.e. it must not get hot and waste energy at any speed—and it must be able to stand the full current that could conceivably flow under any full-load condition. One of the most common types of speed controllers uses pulse-width modulation (PWM). PWM controllers send high frequency pulses of power to the motor(s). As more power is needed the pulses become longer in duration.

=== Electric motor ===
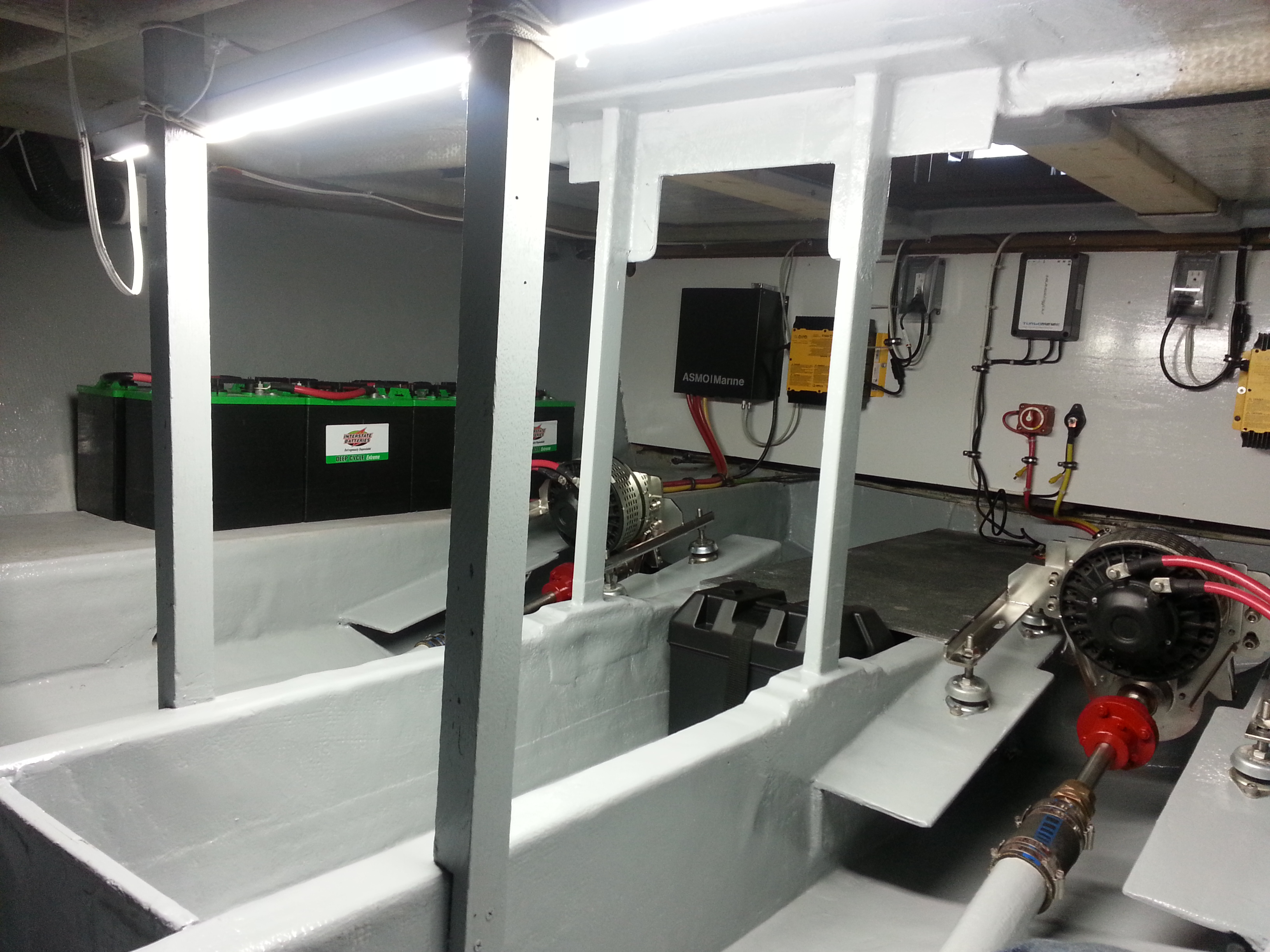
An example of an electric retrofit. Two 9 kW LMC motors powered by 16 Interstate deep-cycle 6-volt batteries.

A wide variety of electric motor technologies are in use. Traditional field-wound DC motors were and still are used. Today many boats use lightweight permanent magnet DC motors. The advantage of both types is that while the speed can be controlled electronically, this is not a requirement. Some boats use AC motors or permanent magnet brushless motors. The advantages of these are the lack of commutators which can wear out or fail and the often lower currents allowing thinner cables; the disadvantages are the total reliance on the required electronic controllers and the usually high voltages which require a high standard of insulation.

=== Drive train ===
Traditional boats use an inboard motor powering a propeller through a propeller shaft complete with bearings and seals. Often a gear reduction is incorporated in order to be able to use a larger more efficient propeller. This can be a traditional gear box, coaxial planetary gears or a transmission with belts or chains. Because of the inevitable loss associated with gearing, many drives eliminate it by using slow high-torque motors. The electric motor can be encapsulated into a pod with the propeller and fixed outside the hull (saildrive) or on an outboard fixture (outboard motor).

== Types ==
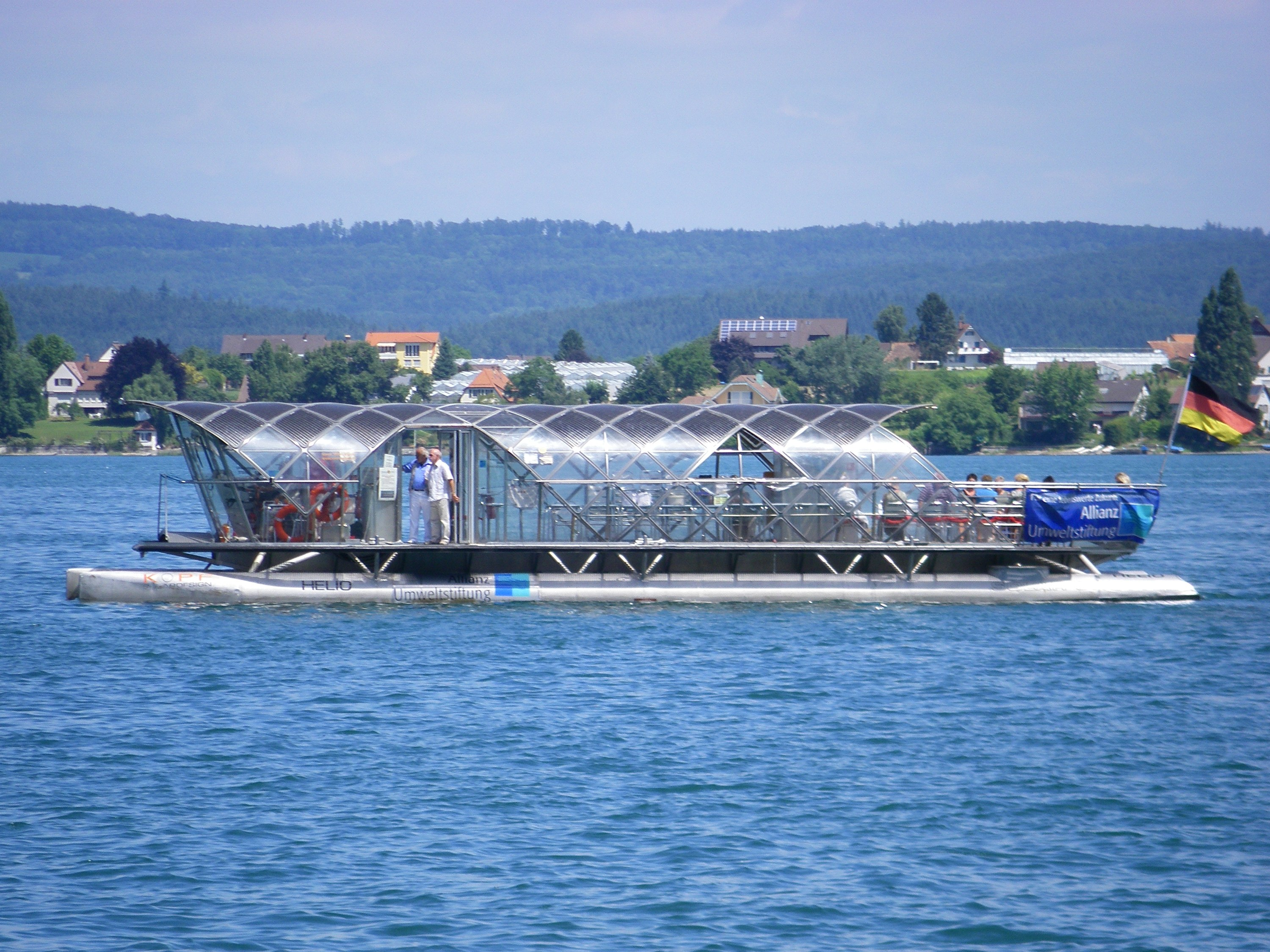
RA66 Helio is a solar-powered 20 m catamaran cruising on the Untersee, a part of Lake Constance. It is based in Radolfzell, Germany.

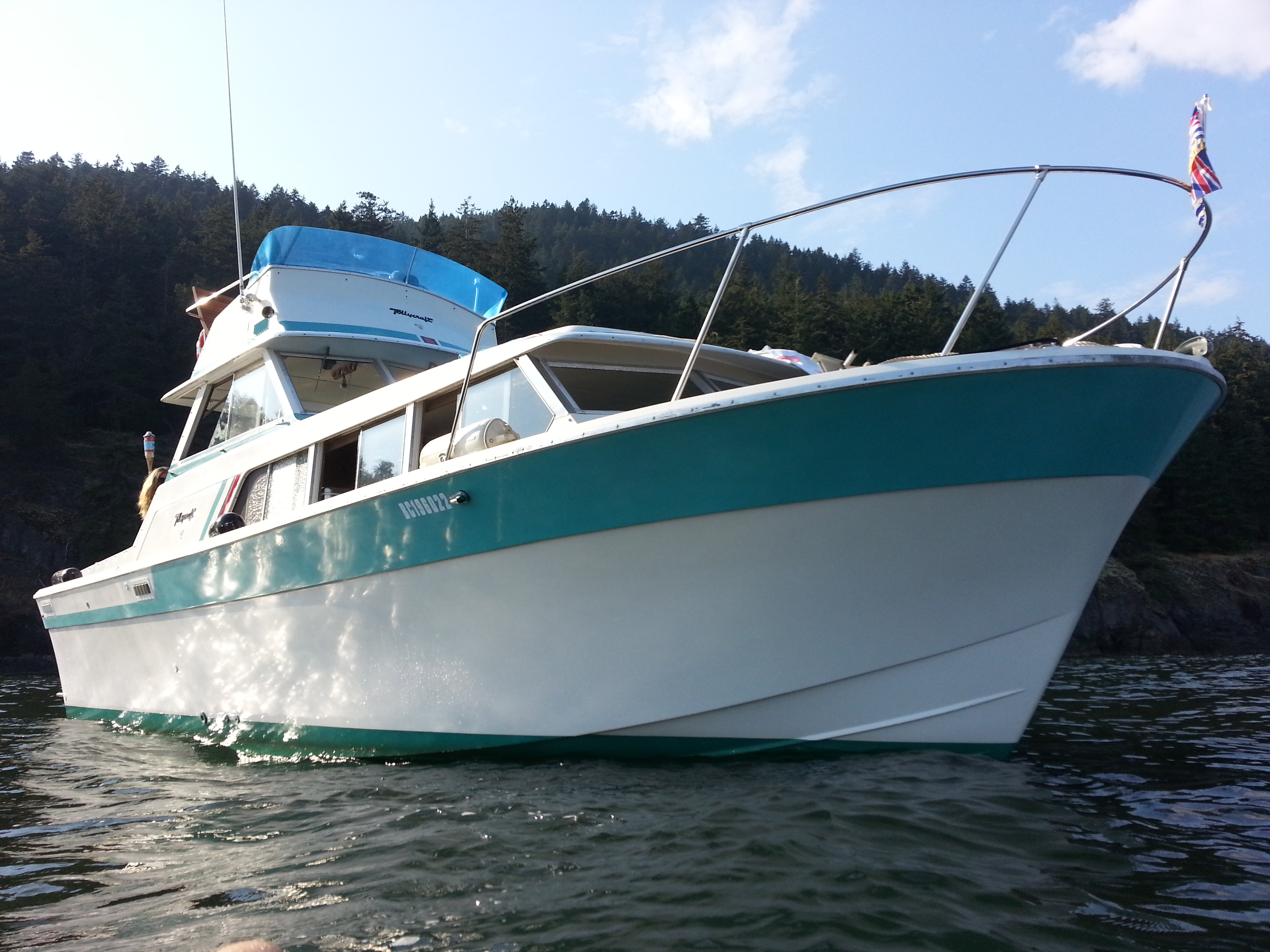
An example of an old idea re-birthed. In 2014, the first electric retrofit of its kind was performed on a 1973 Tollycraft 30' Sedan Cruiser. The vessel was originally powered by two (2) Chrysler 318 V8's accompanied by two (2) 80 gallon fuel tanks. The conversion took place in Vancouver, Canada and the vessel (e-Tolly) is now powered by two 9 kW LMC motors with energy supplied by 16 Interstate deep-cycle 6 -volt batteries. Maximum Endurance 13 h. Maximum Speed 10 knots.

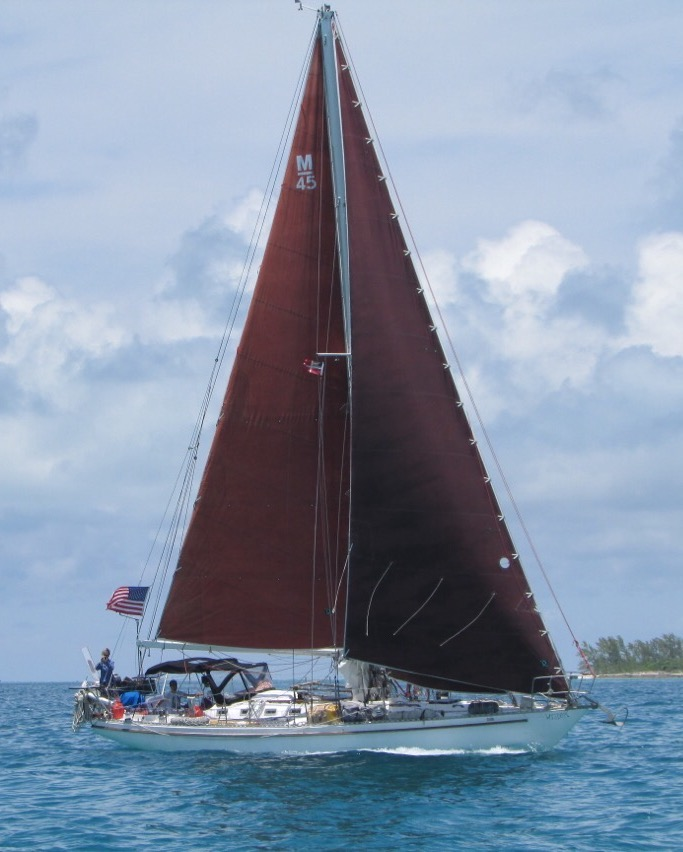
Sailboat Wisdom on her voyage across oceans with an electric motor

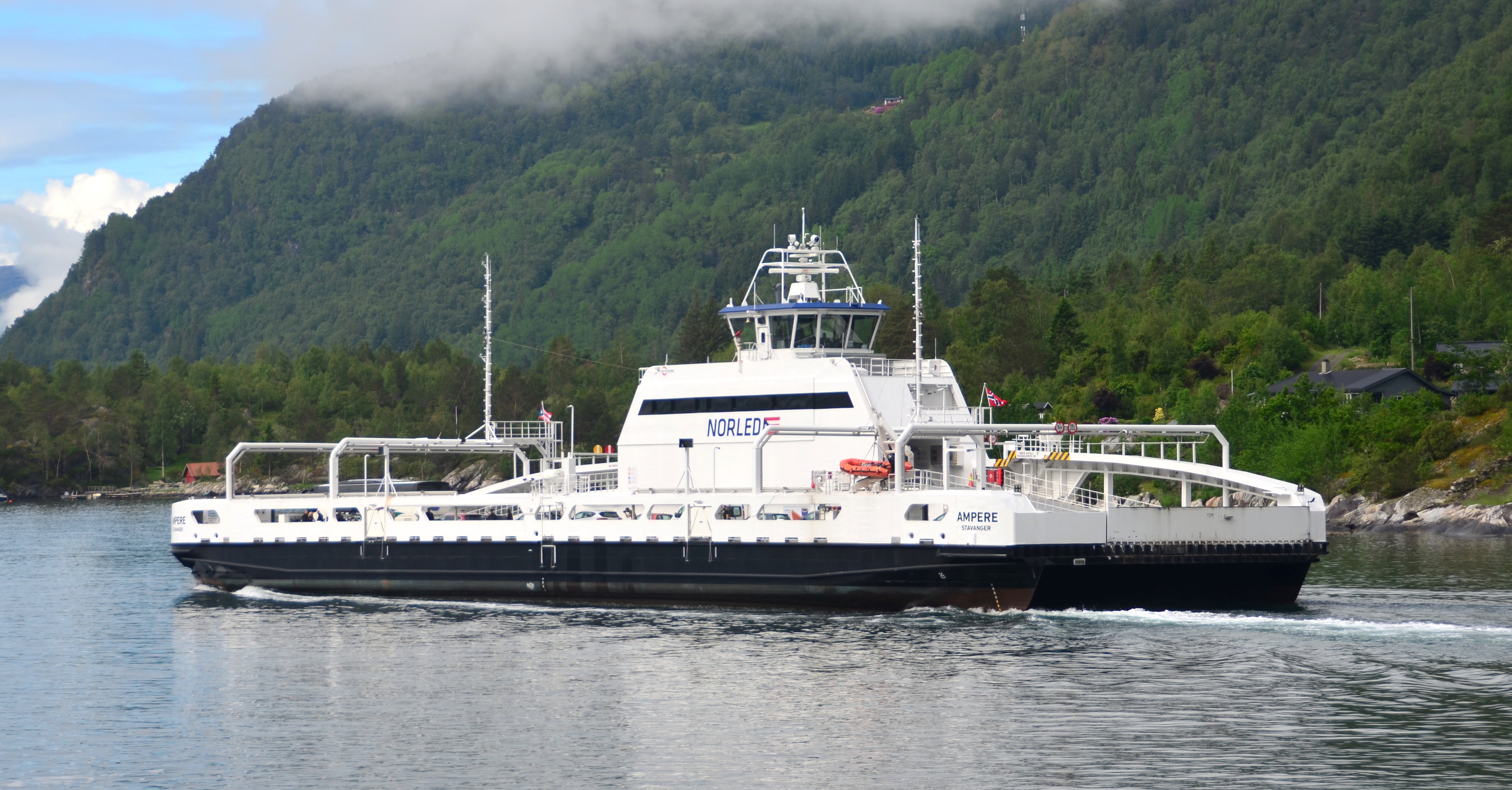
MV Ampere, battery–electric ferry in regular operation in Norway

Official videos for Ampere
- Video on YouTube
- by NorLed on YouTube
- Charging and suction docking on YouTube

There are as many types of electric boat as there are boats with any other method of propulsion, but some types are significant for various reasons.

- Historical and restored electric boats, such as the Mary Gordon Electric Boat, exist and are often important projects for those involved.
- Range anxiety is a common concern for those considering electric propulsion on a boat. In 2018, the crew of Rigging Doctor on board Wisdom crossed the Atlantic Ocean with an electric motor.
- Canal, river and lake boats. Electric boats, with their limited range and performance, have tended to be used mostly on inland waterways, where their complete lack of local pollution is a significant advantage. Electric drives are also available as auxiliary propulsion for sailing yachts on inland waters.
- Electric outboards and trolling motors have been available for some years at prices from about $100 (US) up to several thousand. These require external batteries in the bottom of the boat, but are otherwise practical one-piece items. Most available electric outboards are not as efficient as custom drives, but are optimised for their intended use, e.g. for inland waterway fishermen. They are quiet and they do not pollute the water or the air, so they do not scare away or harm fish, birds and other wildlife. Combined with modern waterproof battery packs, electric outboards are also ideal for yacht tenders and other inshore pleasure boats.
- Electric personal watercraft have been invented but yet to be fully commercialized. These watercraft use a high powered internal battery systems that are waterproofed and propel the vessel at high speeds using a jet drive propulsion. The most first successful project of electric personal watercraft is by United States Company ELAQUA Marine.
- Cruising yachts usually have an auxiliary engine, and there are two main uses for it: One is to power ahead or motor-sail at sea when the wind is light or from the wrong direction. The other is to provide the last 10 minutes or so of propulsion when the boat is in port and needs to be manoeuvred into a tight berth in a crowded and confined marina or harbour. Electric propulsion is not suitable for prolonged cruising at full power although the power required to motor slowly in light airs and calm seas is small. Regarding the second case, electric drives are ideally suited as they can be finely controlled and can provide substantial power for short periods of time.
- Commercial ferries:
  - Norway's first battery–electric ferry is MV Ampere, with capacity for 120 cars and 12 trucks. As of November 2016, it has operated for 106,000 km. Its battery holds 1 MWh of energy, but the 9-minute charge time is sometimes not enough, and more battery capacity is to be installed. Norway has scheduled several other electric ferry projects. Based on operational data, Siemens concludes in a life cycle analysis that 61 of Norway's 112 diesel ferry routes could be replaced by electric ferries with a payback time of 5 years. The analysis includes auxiliary costs such as chargers, grid, and so on.
  - In Finland Föri, the historic Turku city ferry across the Aura River to Abo, was converted to all-electric propulsion in April 2017. The vessel was introduced as a wood-burning steam ferry in 1904, converted to diesel operation in 1955 and now provides a continuous daily service from 0615 to late evening for foot and cycle passengers on battery power. Charging takes place at night.
  - Other projects are considered in Canada, Sweden and Denmark.
  - India's First Solar Ferry, a 75-passenger boat, that is powered by sun and grid charging with lithium batteries, began service in 2017. Based on the predictions of consumption the payback time is 3 years.
  - Some ferries can charge their onboard batteries while docked by using a pantograph.
  - On the other hand, ferries can include, sometimes free, charging points for the passengers' transported electric bicycle, electric motorcycles and electric cars.
- Diesel–electric hybrid: There is a third potential use for a diesel auxiliary and that is to charge the batteries, when they suddenly start to wane far from shore in the middle of the night, or at anchor after some days of living aboard. In this case, where this kind of use is to be expected, perhaps on a larger cruising yacht, then a combined diesel–electric solution may be designed from the start. The diesel engine is installed with the prime purpose of charging the battery banks, and the electric motor with that of propulsion. There is some reduction in efficiency if motoring for long distances as the diesel's power is converted first to electricity and then to motion, but there is a balancing saving every time the wind-, sail- and solar-charged batteries are used for manoeuvring and for short journeys without starting the diesel. There is the flexibility of being able to start the diesel as a pure generator whenever required. The main losses are in weight and installation cost, but on the bigger cruising boats that may sit at anchor running large diesels for hours every day, these are not too big an issue, compared to the savings that can be made at other times. An example is the fishing boat Selfa El-Max 1099, with 135 kWh battery and 80 kW diesel generator. An LNG-powered supply vessel started operation in 2016 with a 653 kWh/1600 kW battery acting as spinning reserve during dynamic positioning, saving 15-30% fuel.
- Solar powered: A boat propelled by direct solar energy is a marine solar vehicle. The available sunlight is almost always converted to electricity by solar cells, temporarily stored in accumulator batteries, and used to drive a propeller through an electric motor. Power levels are usually on the order of a few hundred watts to a few kilowatts. Solar powered boats started to become known around 1985 and in 1995 the first commercial solar passenger boats appeared. Solar powered boats have been used successfully at sea. The first crossing of the Atlantic Ocean was achieved in the winter of 2006/2007 by the solar catamaran Sun21. (see also List of solar-powered boats)

=== Wired electric boats ===
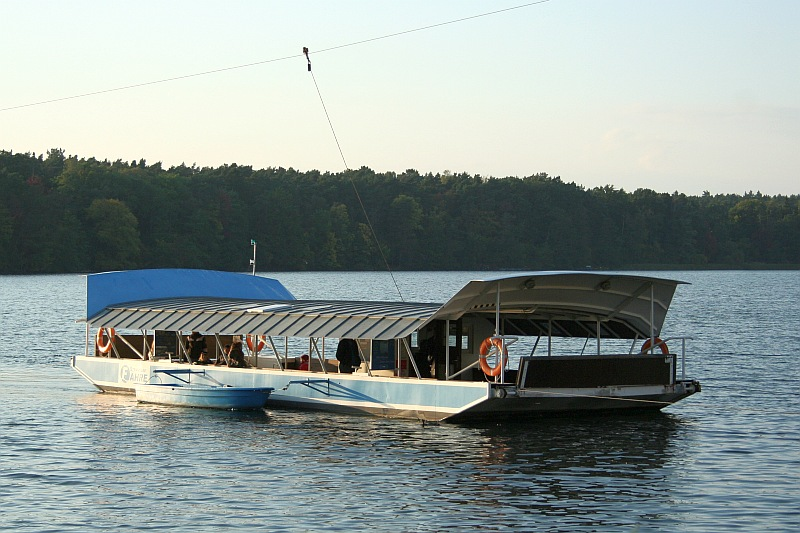
The electric ferry Steffi on the Straussee, 30 km east of Berlin

Trolley boats are a special category of electric boats are the vessels receiving their electrical power by wire. This may involve overhead wires, where one or two wires are fixed over the water and the boat can make contact with them to draw electric current, or a waterproof tether cable may be used to connect the boat to shore. In case of a single overhead wire the electrical circuit has to be closed by the water itself, giving rise to a larger resistance and corrosion of the electrodes. In case of two wires no electric current has to be sent through the water, but the twin wires, which cause a short-circuit whenever they come into contact with each other, complicate the construction.

Naturally the boat has to stay close to the wire, or its tether point, and therefore it is limited in its manoeuvrability. For ferries and on narrow canals this is no problem. The Straussee Ferry in Strausberg, Germany is an example. It crosses a lake along a 370 m trajectory and is powered by 170 V from a single overhead wire. The Kastellet ferry crosses a 200 metres (660 ft) wide shipping channel in Sweden, using a submergible tethered supply cable which is lowered to the sea-bed when the ferry is docked at the opposite terminal to its tethering point.

In the Mauvages tunnel on the Marne-Rhine Canal a bipolar overhead line provides 600 V DC to an electrical tug, pulling itself and several ships through the 4877 m tunnel along a submerged chain. This prevents the buildup of diesel exhaust fumes in the tunnel. Another example was the experimental electrical tug Teltow on the Kleinmachnower See, 17 km south-west of Berlin. It was used from 1903 until 1910 and had current collection poles based on those used by trolley buses.

== Pollution and embodied energy ==
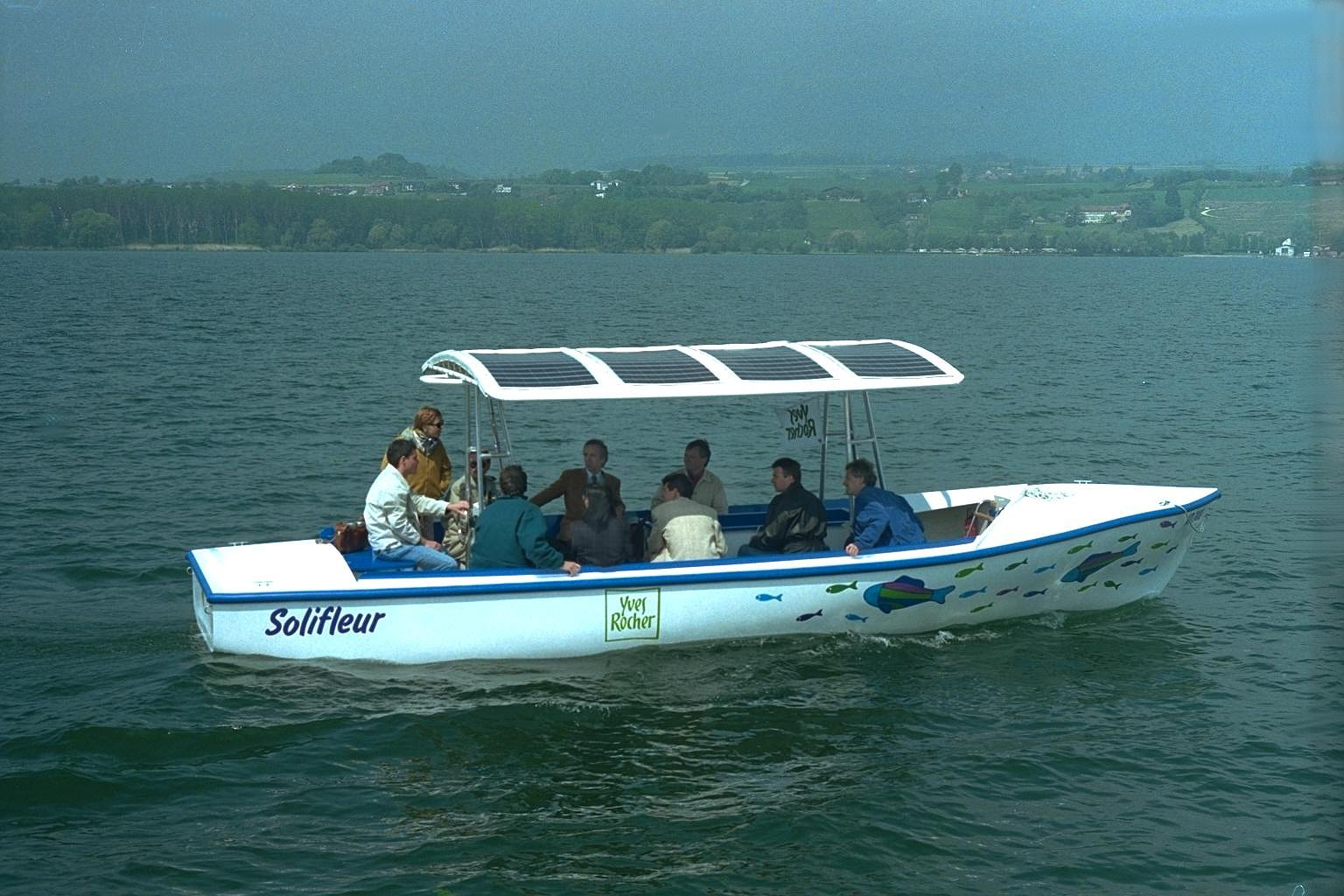
The solar passenger boat Solifleur, Switzerland, 1995

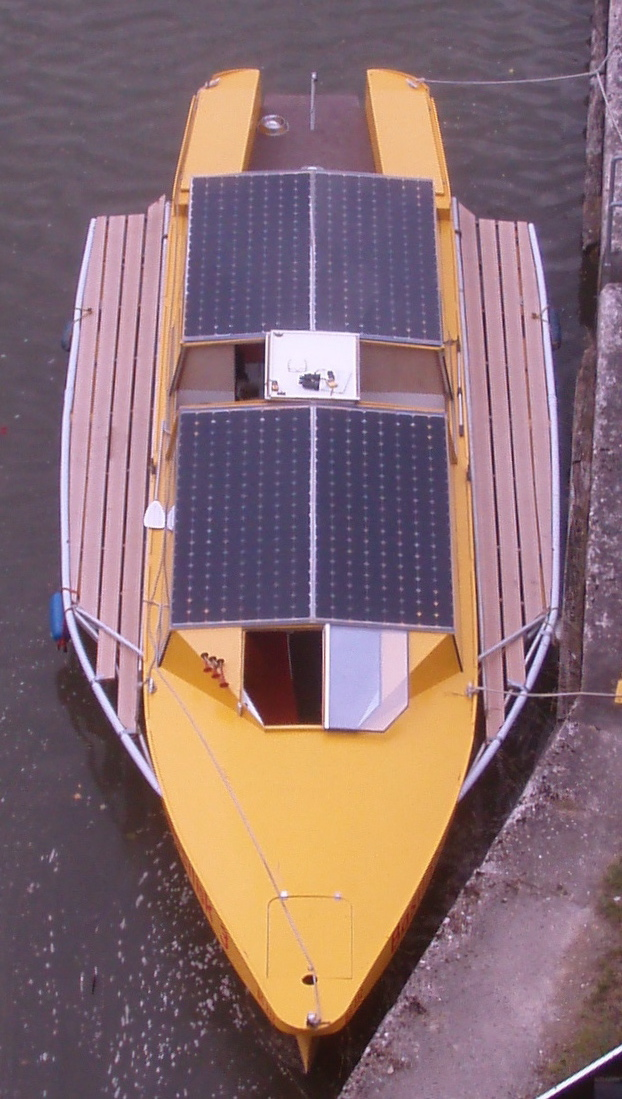
Basilisk 3

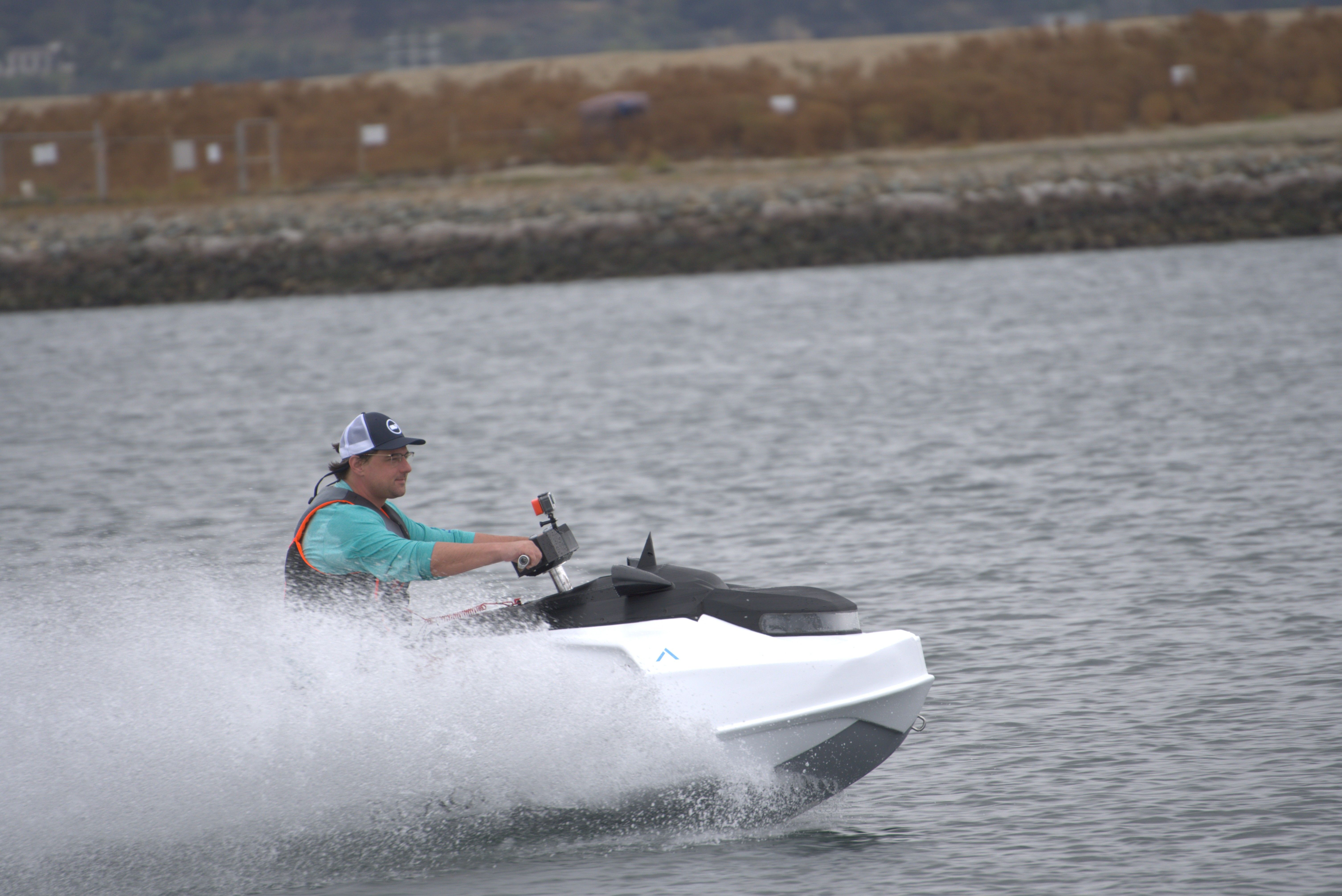
In 2023 ELAQUA commercializes an electric personal watercraft

A 2016 life-cycle study in Norway states that electric ferries and hybrid offshore supply ships compensate for the environmental effects of producing lithium-ion batteries in less than 2 months.

== Solar ships ==
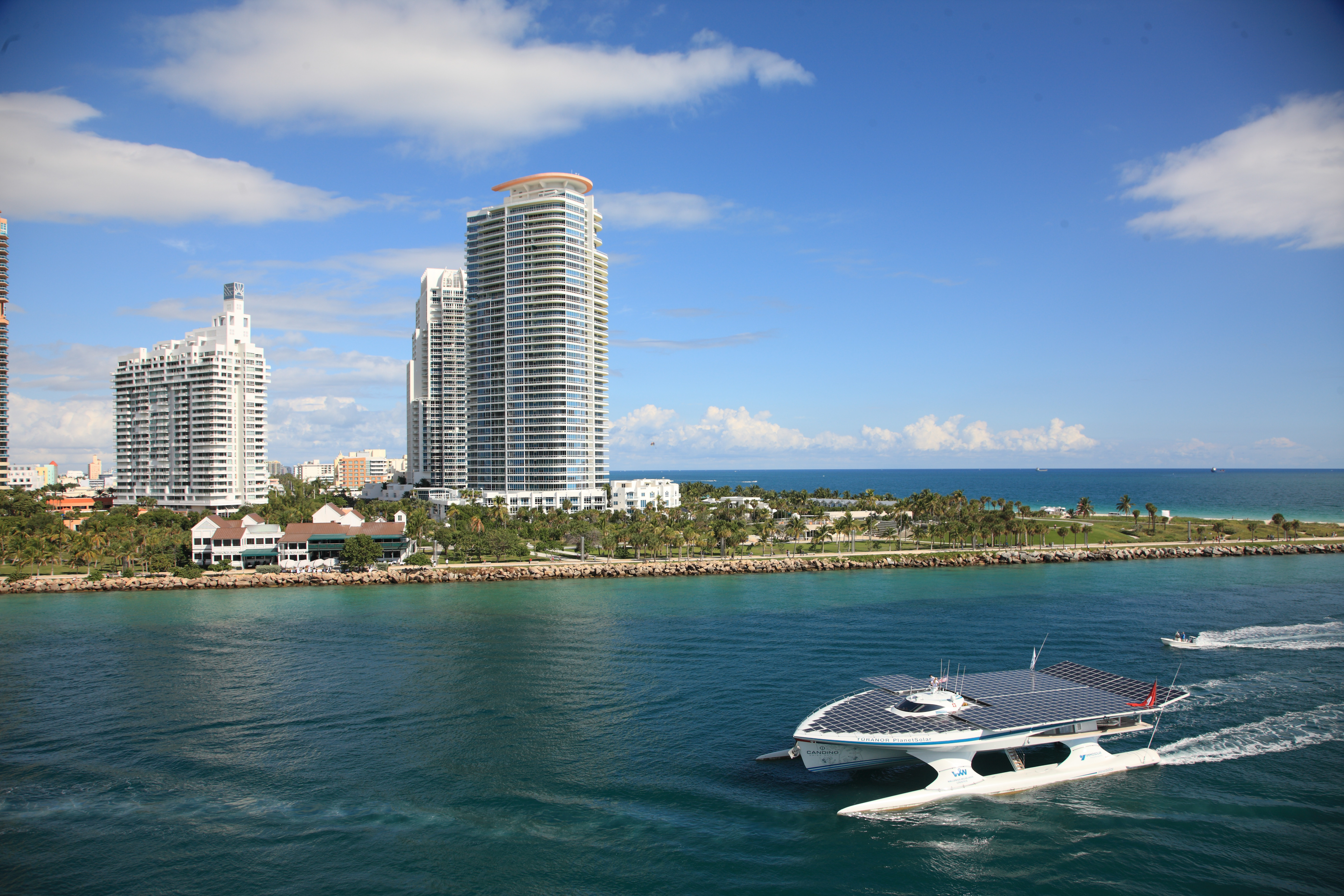
PlanetSolar, the world's largest solar-powered boat and the first ever solar electric boat to circumnavigate the globe (in 2012)

The first passenger solar vessels started to appear in Switzerland in 1995 with the Solifleur (pictured above), which was also the first solar vessel to feed more energy into the electricity grid than it consumed, on a yearly average, via a grid connection when docked.

In 2010, the Tûranor PlanetSolar, a 35-metre long, 26-metre wide catamaran yacht powered by 537 square metres of solar panels, was unveiled. On 4 May 2012 it completed a 60,023 kilometres (37,297 mi) circumnavigation of the Earth in Monaco after 585 days and visiting 28 different countries, without using any fossil fuel. It is so far the largest solar-powered boat ever built.

India's first solar ferry – the Aditya – a 75-passenger boat fully powered by sun, is under construction. It is expected to be completed by the middle of 2016.

Japan's biggest shipping line Nippon Yusen and Nippon Oil Corporation said solar panels capable of generating 40 kilowatts of electricity would be placed on top of a 60,000 tonne car carrier ship to be used by Toyota.

The Monaco yacht company Wally has announced a "gigayacht" designed for billionaires torn between buying a mansion and a superyacht. The Why 58 x 38 is designed to have an autonomous cruising range of 12,000 miles at 12 knots by means of 900m^{2} of solar panels which generate 150 kW to assist the diesel–electric motors and optional Skysails.

== List of battery–electric ships ==
List of battery–electric ships, charged mainly from shore power
Operating year	Name	Country	Battery energy MWh	Charge power MW	Charger type	Notes / Refs
2015	MV Ampere	Norway	1	1.2	Gravity plug Pantograph	Car/passenger ferry on 7 km (4 nmi) route
2016	MS Vision of the Fjords	Aurlandsfjord, Norway	1.8	0.9	Gravity plug	Carbon fibre hybrid electric catamaran sightseeing vessel (max speed 36 km/h; 19.5 kn)
2017	Aditya	India	0.05	0.03	Manual	75 passenger solar ferry
2017	MF Tycho Brahe	Denmark/Sweden	4.16	11	Robot plug	HH Ferry route
2017	MF Aurora	Denmark/Sweden	4.16	11	Robot plug	HH Ferry route (6 km; 3 nmi)
2017	Elektra	Finland	1		Gravity plug	Similar to Ampere
2017		China	2.4			Coal ship
2018	MS Future of the Fjords	Aurlandsfjord, Norway	1.8	0.9	Gravity plug	Carbon fibre catamaran sightseeing vessel (max speed 19.5kn). Sister to Legacy of the Fjords.
2019	E-ferry Ellen	Denmark	4.2	4.4	Automatic plug	Car/passenger ferry on 41 km (22 nmi) route
2019	Junlyu	China				Sightseeing on Yangtze River in Wuhan
2019	Herjólfur	Iceland	3	2.5	Robot plug	Sails a 6.5 NM route between Vestmannaeyjar and Landeyjahöfn.
2020	Gee's Bend	USA	0.27			15 Car / 132 passenger ferry
2020	Gisas Power	Turkey	2.9			Tug
2020	MS Legacy of the Fjords	Oslofjord, Norway	1.8	0.9	Gravity plug	Carbon fibre catamaran sightseeing vessel (max speed 19.5kn). Sister to Future of the Fjords.
2021	Bastø Electric	Norway	4.3	7.2		Moss–Horten, 200 cars
2021	IRON	Bangladesh			Solar-powered	Tourism cruises of flooded river basins in an environmentally sensitive area of the country.
2021	Grotte	Denmark	1.1		Plug	Car/passenger ferry
2021	Sparky	New Zealand	2.8		Shore	Harbour tugboat, diesel hybrid
2022	Ika Rere	New Zealand		0.3	Type 2 Combo	Passenger Ferry
2022	MV Yara Birkeland	Norway	6.7			Container ship (120 TEU)
2022	Yangtze River Three Gorges 1	China	7.5			100 km Sightseeing on Yangtze River. 1,300 passengers
2023	Kochi Water Metro	Kerala, India			Shore	Hybrid passenger ferry boat with 100 passenger capacity and 8 knot speed in electric and 10 knot speed in hybrid mode. Developed by Cochin Shipyard.
2023	Barracuda	Mumbai, India	0.2	0.01	Slow charge	GRP, hybrid solar–electric catamaran work boat (max speed 12.5 kn with 6 kW solar plant)
2024	Greenwater 01	China	50			Container ship (700 TEU)
2025	Gezhouba	Hubei, China	24			129.98 m (425 ft) bulk carrier, 13,740 ton maximum deadweight
2026	The Baltic Whale	Denmark/Germany	10	15	Robot plug	Scandlines, 66 trucks
2026	Ning Yuan Dian Kun	China	19		shore power & container swapping	127.8 m (419 ft) length, 21.6 m (71 ft) beam, capacity of 742 TEU containers, 130 km (70 nmi) route
2026	China Zorrilla	Colonia, Uruguay	40	15	Gravity plug	130 m (425 ft) passenger and car ferry on 56 km (30 nmi) route
Underway
2027	ESPAÑA 2030	Tarifa–Tangier	11	16	Robot plug	87 m (285 ft) passenger and car ferry on 33 km (18 nmi) route

Gallery of battery ships

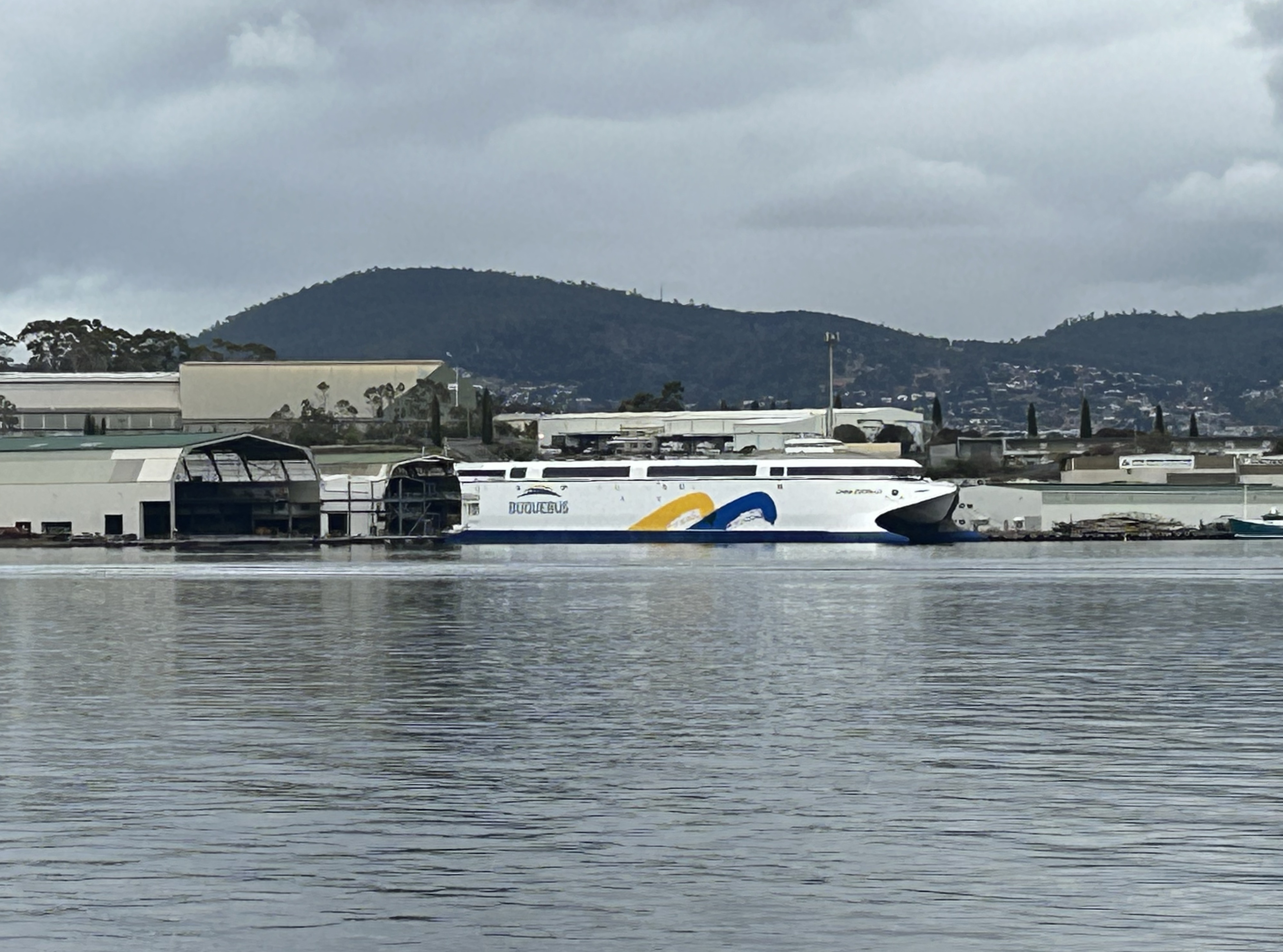
China Zorrilla

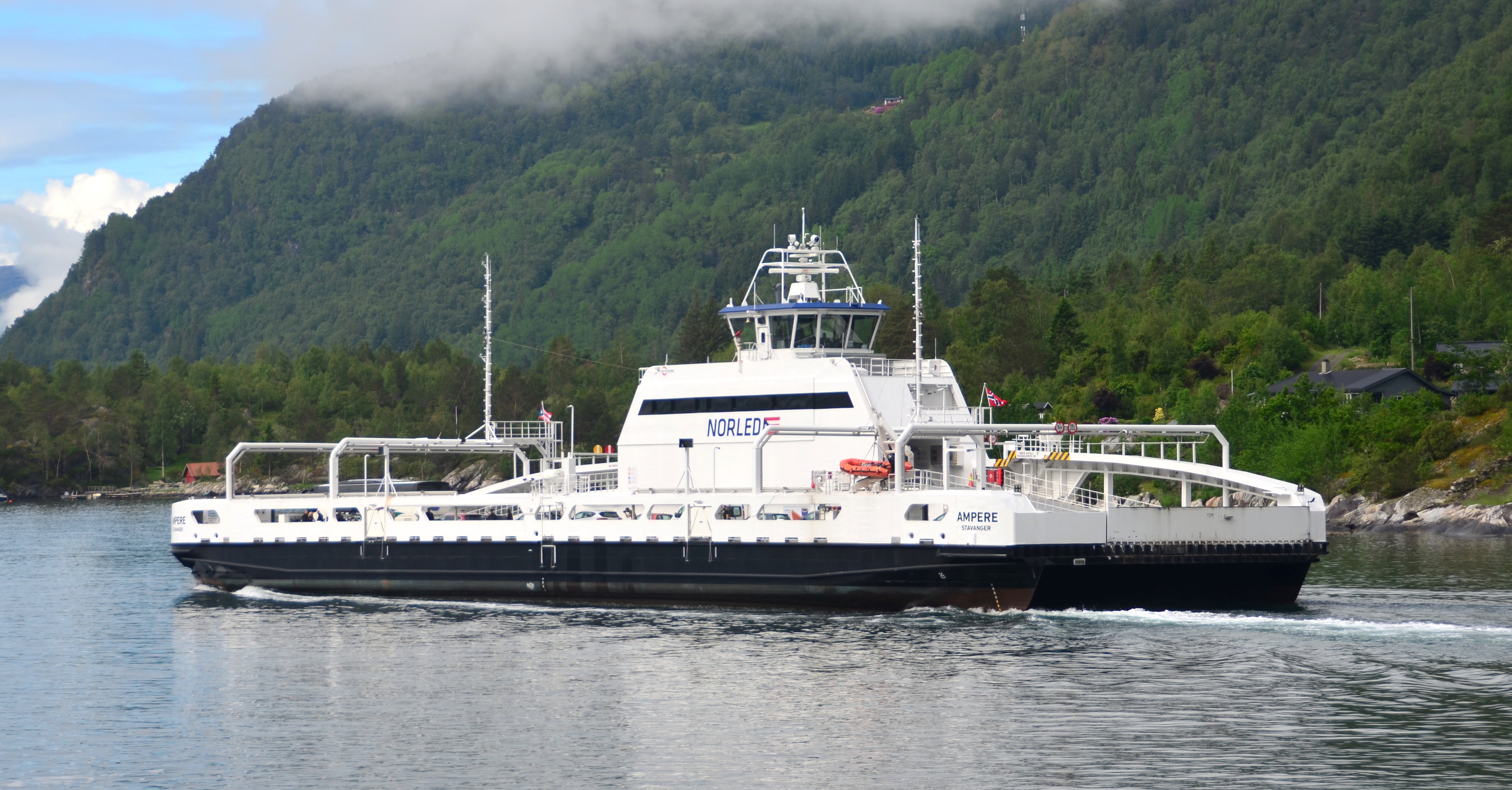
MV Ampere

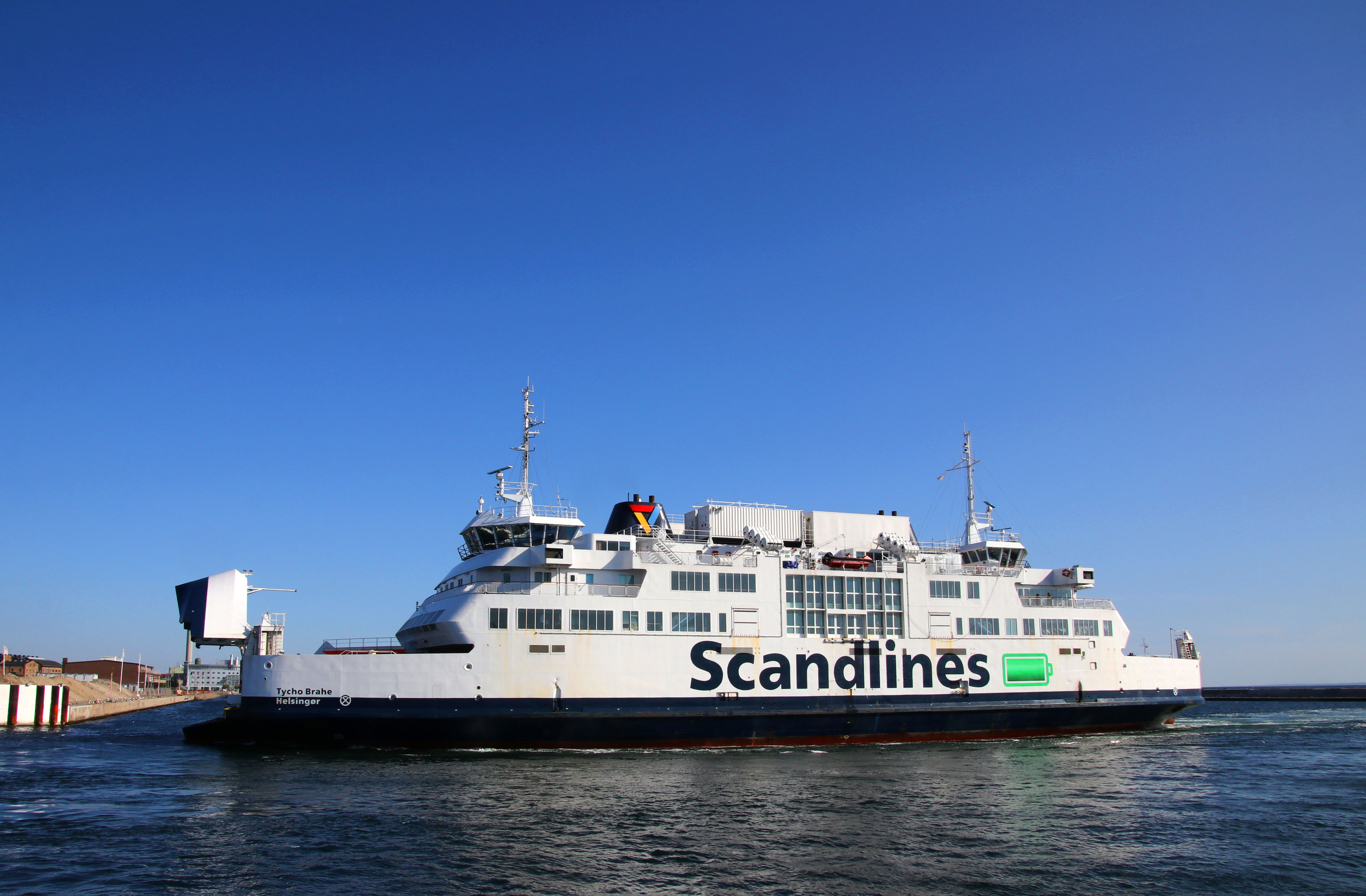
MF Tycho Brahe

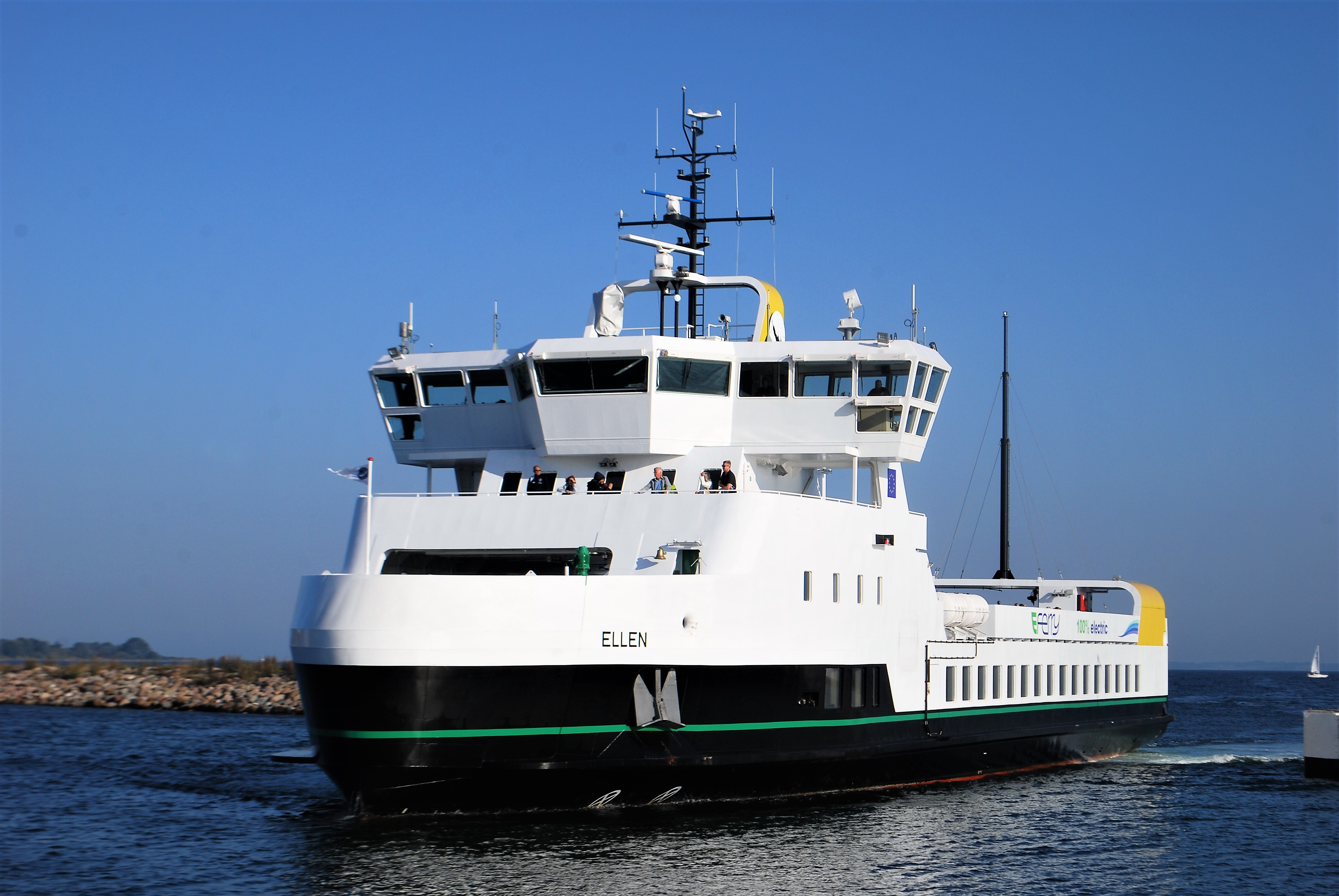
E-ferry Ellen

Solar electric catamaran vessel to carry at least 50 passengers.

== See also ==
- Catalina 30
- Cruising
- DC distribution system (ship propulsion)
- e5 Project
- Electric aircraft
- Electric battery
- Electric outboard motor
- Electric vehicle
- Frisian Solar Challenge
- Hydrogen-powered ship
- Integrated electric propulsion
  - Diesel–electric transmission
  - Turbine–electric transmission
- Lloyd's Register
- Open source hardware
- Oceanvolt
- Renewable energy
- Solar Splash
- Trolley boat
