= Arc (company) =

American electric boat manufacturer

- Industry: Boat building
- Founded: 2021
- Founders: Mitch Lee, Ryan Cook
- Headquarters: Los Angeles, United States
- Key people: Mitch Lee (CEO), Ryan Cook (CTO)
- Products: Arc One, Arc Sport, Arc Coast, Electric Tugs
- Website: arcboats.com

Arc Boat Company (Arc) is an American electric boat manufacturer based in Los Angeles, California, specializing in high-performance, all-electric watercraft. Since its founding in 2021, Arc has raised over $100 million in funding from notable investors, including Andreessen Horowitz, Eclipse Ventures, Menlo Ventures, and celebrities like Will Smith and Kevin Durant. The company has developed several fully electric boats: the Arc One, a luxury cruiser; the Arc Sport, a wake sport boat; the Arc Coast, a center console; and electric workboats for commercial use.

== Background ==
Arc was cofounded in 2021 by Mitch Lee, who serves as its CEO, and Ryan Cook, who serves as its CTO. Cook, a former lead engineer at SpaceX, brought aerospace expertise to Arc’s innovative approach to electric boating. The company initially raised $4.25 million in seed funding, followed by a separate celebrity-backed round that included celebrities like Will Smith and Kevin Durant. In November 2021, Arc raised an additional $30 million in a Series A funding round led by Eclipse Ventures, which supported the development and production of its first model, the Arc One. In July 2023, they raised an additional $70 million in a Series B round from Menlo Ventures and a bevy of returning investors, including Eclipse, Andreessen Horowitz, Lowercarbon Capital and Abstract Ventures.

== Products ==
=== Arc One ===
The Arc One is a 24-foot luxury electric boat introduced in late 2021 with a price tag of $300,000. It features a 220 kWh battery pack, providing over five hours of runtime on the water, depending on usage. Deliveries began in spring 2022. The Arc One offers 500 horsepower, a 12-person capacity, and a sleek aluminum hull designed for durability and performance. Its elegant design and groundbreaking technology have been praised in the media.

=== Arc Sport ===
The Arc Sport, unveiled in February 2024, is a 23-foot electric wake boat designed for water sports. It features a 226 kWh battery pack and a 500 horsepower electric motor, delivering instant torque that surpasses other premium gas-powered wake boats. The boat accommodates up to 15 passengers and includes features such as customizable ballast systems for optimal wake shaping, an auto-retract hardtop tower for adjustable towing points and storage, and both bow and stern thrusters. The Arc Sport offers a range of 4 to 6 hours of active use, including towing.

=== Arc Coast ===
Announced in May 2025, the Arc Coast is a 24-foot all-electric center console boat. It features a 226 kWh battery pack, a 400 horsepower electric motor, and a top speed of approximately 50 mph. The boat accommodates up to 10 passengers and includes a redesigned helm with integrated navigation, diagnostics, and entertainment controls. Its open deck layout, full-beam swim platform, and spacious sunpad are tailored for activities ranging from fishing to sandbar gatherings. The Arc Coast is expected to start delivering in 2026, with a starting price of $168,000.

== Commercial workboats and infrastructure ==
In 2025, Arc expanded into the commercial sector. In a $160 million partnership with Curtin Maritime, Arc is building eight hybrid-electric ship-assist tugboats to operate in the Ports of Los Angeles and Long Beach by 2027. The fleet of 4,000-horsepower vessels, powered by 6 megawatt-hour batteries, will be the largest commercial deployment of electric workboats in marine industry history.

Arc also partnered with Portland-based shipyard Diversified Marine Inc. to retrofit a 26-foot tugboat with an electric drivetrain for use at the Port of Los Angeles. The electric tugboat features a 600-horsepower dual-motor drivetrain, large lithium-ion battery packs, a modernized captain's helm, and real-time performance monitoring. Designed for short, repetitive missions requiring high torque, the electric tug aims to reduce operating expenses and emissions. Arc's vertical integration across hardware and software enables efficient scaling of this technology for broader commercial applications.

To facilitate the operation of its electric vessels, Arc announced plans to install charging infrastructure at the Port of Los Angeles in June 2025. Located within a 35-acre research campus operated by the nonprofit AltaSea, they will focus on R&D, on-water testing, and fleet deployment of electric workboats.
