= Frisian Solar Challenge =

Solar boat race

The Frisian Solar Boat Challenge is a 137 miles (220 km) solar boat race.

The race starts in Leeuwarden, the capital of Friesland, and follows the classic route of the Eleven City Tour. Following the canals, rivers, and lakes, with the occasional portage, the race features 40 teams from eight countries, including Belgium, Germany, Great Britain, Luxembourg, the Netherlands, Poland, Sweden, and one long-distance entry, a team from the Federal University of Rio in Brazil.

The race is divided into three classes: the A class is for one-seater boats, the B class is for two-seater boats, and the open or C class can have a crew of any amount. To keep the costs down, entries in the A and B class can borrow solar panels from the race's sponsors, Sharp and The Sun Factory. As of June 24 2008, two Dutch teams appear to be competing for the prize, as the Technical University of Delft (running in the C class) won the first stage, and preliminary results show the Hanze Solar Team (running in the A class) winning the second stage. The six-day race concludes back at its starting point in Leeuwarden.
