= Landeyjahöfn =

Ferry port in Iceland

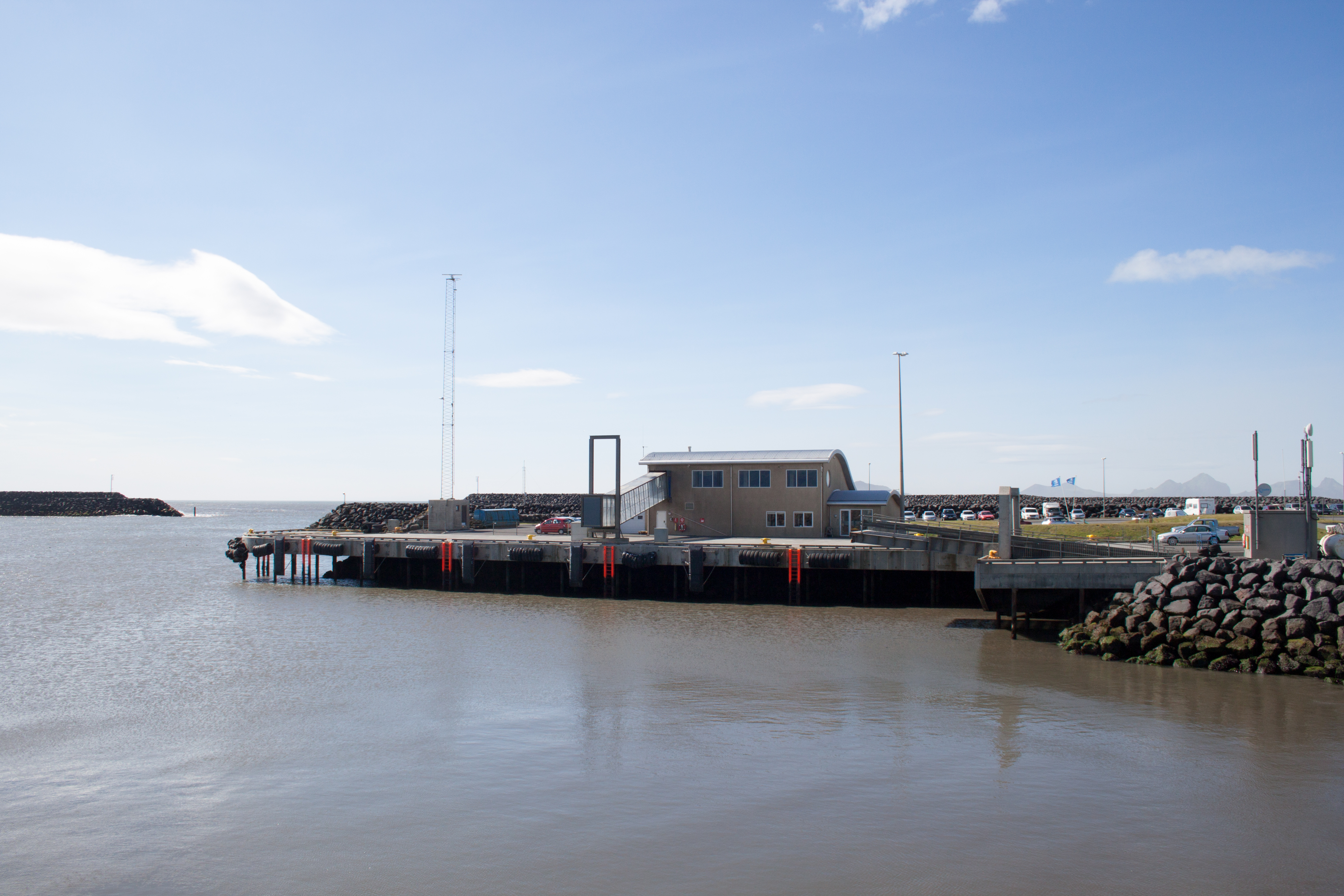
Landeyjahöfn ferry terminal

Landeyjahöfn (Icelandic pronunciation: [ˈlantˌeiːjaˌhœpn̥]), also previously referred to as Bakkafjöruhöfn [ˈpahkaˌfjœːrʏˌhœpn̥], is a roll-on/roll-off ferry terminal and harbour serving the Herjólfur ferry to Vestmannaeyjar island.

The harbour was opened on 21 July 2010. It has a main ferry dock and terminal as well as a dock for smaller boats.

The harbour is around 140 km from Reykjavík. It was constructed to reduce the sailing distance from Vestmannaeyjar to the mainland. Previously, the Herjólfur ferry sailed from Þorlákshöfn, taking approximately three hours to cover the 75 km to Vestmannaeyjar. The distance from Landeyjahöfn to Vestmannaeyjar is around 12 km, and the ferry now takes 30 minutes.

Being constructed on sand, the harbour has had considerable issues with sand and silt buildup and needs to be dredged regularly. During periods of poor weather and high wave height (especially during winter) the ferry is redirected to Þorlákshöfn.

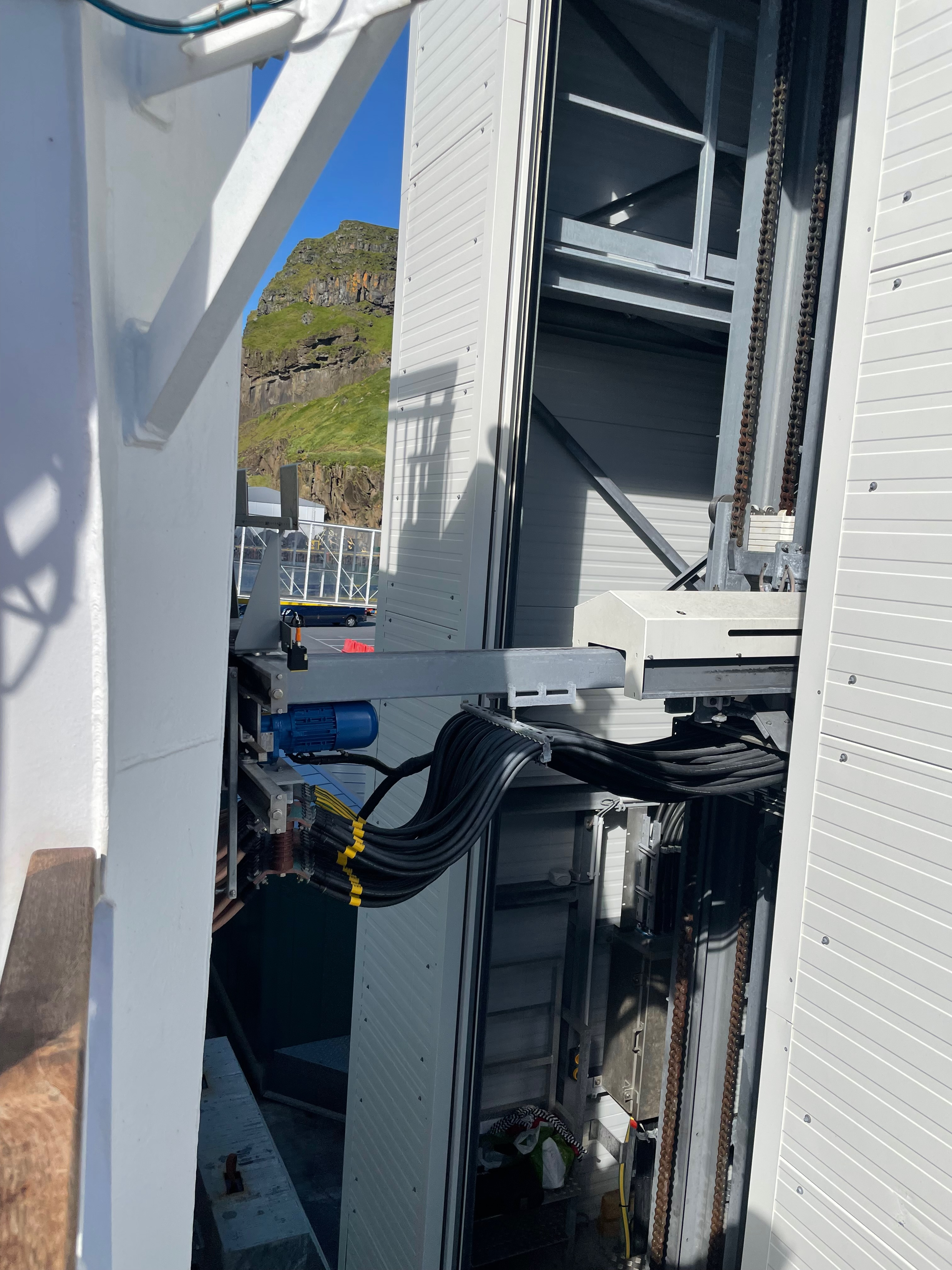
Electric ferry charging station for the Herjólfur ferry. One is located in Vestmannaeyjar, the other in Landeyjahöfn.

== Ship-to-shore connection ==
In August 2020, an electric ferry charging station was installed to charge a new hybrid-electric Herjólfur ferry introduced in 2019. When sailing between Vestmannaeyjar and Landeyjahöfn, it runs purely on electricity.

The charger couples automatically with the ferry once it has docked and charges the ferry in 30 minutes while loading and unloading passengers and goods, with a power output of 2.5MW. The ferry has a 3MWh battery. The system saves around 50,000 litres of fuel per week and 3.5 million tonnes of CO_{2} per year.
