= Oceanvolt =

Finnish boat electric motor manufacturer

- Industry: Marine Equipment
- Founded: Helsinki, Finland (2004)
- Founder: Janne Kjellman
- Headquarters: Helsinki, Finland
- Key people: Mikael Heikfolk (CEO); Jussi Tuuri (CFO); Alec von Weissenberg (Commercial Director); Anna Hietanen (Head of Marketing)
- Website: www.oceanvolt.com

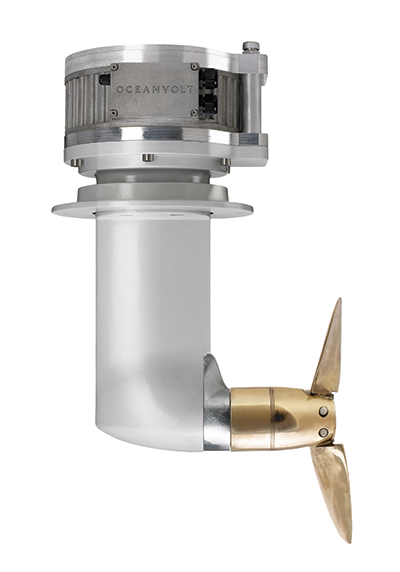
The award-winning Oceanvolt SD8.6 electric motor system for sailboats

Oceanvolt is a Finnish manufacturer of electric and hybrid propulsion systems for sailboats and other marine vessels. Founded in 2004, the company is headquartered in Helsinki, Finland, and specializes in zero-emission, low-maintenance, and quiet alternatives to traditional diesel engines. Oceanvolt’s propulsion systems are widely used in cruising yachts, racing sailboats, and commercial vessels.

== Products ==
Oceanvolt produces a range of electric propulsion systems designed for various types of boats:

- Saildrive motors (SD Series) – Compact electric motors ranging from 6 kW to 15 kW, designed as drop-in replacements for diesel saildrives. These motors feature a patented vibration-reduction system and are compatible with Volvo Penta and Yanmar mounting beds.
- ServoProp motors – Featuring a variable pitch propeller, these saildrives optimize propulsion and hydrogeneration, allowing for efficient energy recovery while sailing. The ServoProp 25 is designed for boats up to 70 feet (21 meters).
- Shaft Drive Motors (AXC Series) – A modular system with 12 kW to 36 kW configurations, designed for larger displacement boats, including charter catamarans and motorboats. These motors feature liquid cooling and high torque output.

== Hydrogeneration ==
All Oceanvolt motors include hydrogeneration, which allows the propeller to generate electricity while sailing. This recovered energy can be used to power onboard electronics or recharge the propulsion battery. The ServoProp 10, 15 and 25 are among the most advanced hydrogenerators, capable of generating up to 5 kW at 10 knots.

== Notable projects and boats installed with Oceanvolt electric motors ==
Oceanvolt has partnered with several yacht manufacturers and racing teams, with its propulsion systems installed in high-profile vessels:

- Baltic 68 Café Racer – A performance yacht equipped with an Oceanvolt ServoProp system, developed in collaboration with Baltic Yachts.
- Vendée Globe 2016 – Sailor Conrad Colman completed the race using an Oceanvolt electric motor, making history as the first competitor to finish the race using 100% renewable energy.
- Charter catamarans – Oceanvolt’s AXC and ServoProp systems are widely used in eco-friendly tourism fleets, providing sustainable propulsion for large catamarans.
- X-Yachts X4.9e
- X-Yachts Xc 47
- Sailing La Vagabonde III (Rapido 60)
- Sailing Uma (Pearson 36)
- Alex Thomson Racing (HUGO BOSS)

== Awards and recognition ==
Oceanvolt has received multiple industry awards for its advancements in electric propulsion technology:

- 2023 – DAME Award – Propulsion & Dynamics category and the Overall DAME Award: (Previously HighPower) ServoProp 25
- 2017 – DAME Award 2017 Category Winner (Machinery, Propulsion, Mechanical and Electrical Systems and Fittings): Oceanvolt ServoProp
- 2013 – 2013 Pittman Innovation Award from SAIL Magazine: Oceanvolt SD8.6 and SD15
- 2012 – DAME Award 2012 Special Mention: Machine, propulsion, mechanical and electrical systems and fittings for the Oceanvolt SD8.6
- 2012 – Clean Design Award 2012: Oceanvolt SD8.6

== See also ==
- Electric boat
- Marine propulsion
- Hybrid electric vehicles
