= DC distribution system (ship propulsion) =

The DC distribution system has been proposed, as a replacement for the present AC power distribution system for ships with electric propulsion.

This concept represents a new way of distributing energy for low-voltage installations on ships. It can be used for any electrical ship application up to 20 megawatts and operates at a nominal voltage of 1000 V DC. The DC distribution system is simply an extension of the multiple DC links that already exist in all propulsion and thruster drives, which usually account for more than 80 percent of the electrical power consumption on electric propulsion vessels.

== Benefits ==
In addition to boosting efficiency by up to 20 percent, other benefits include space and weight savings of up to 30 percent and flexible placement of electrical equipment. This allows for significantly more cargo space and a more functional vessel layout where the electrical system is designed around the vessel functions and not vice versa.

The efficiency improvement is mainly achieved from the system no longer being locked at a specific frequency (usually 60 Hz on ships), even though a 60 Hz power source can also be connected to the grid. This new freedom of being able to control each power source totally independently opens up numerous ways of optimizing fuel consumption.

The reduced weight and footprint of the installed electrical equipment will vary depending on the ship type and application. One comparison using the DC distribution system instead of the traditional AC system for a Platform Supply Vessel (PSV), reduced the weight of the electrical system components from 115,520 kilograms (254,680 lb) to 85,360 kilograms (188,190 lb). Another saves 15–30% fuel.

On land, the solar panels on several buildings in Sweden are connected via DC to smooth production and consumption, bypassing the AC grid and its inverters.

== Fuel savings ==
The biggest potential for fuel savings lies in the ease with which energy storage devices, such as batteries or super capacitors, can be added to the system. Energy storage will help the engines level out load variations from the thrusters and other large loads.

=== Operational optimization ===
DC distribution system allows for new ways of thinking regarding operational optimization. The system is flexible and can combine different energy sources such as engines, turbines, and fuel cells. This means that there is the potential to implement an energy management system that takes into account varying fuel prices and the availability of different fuels.

== Challenges ==
Because the main AC switchboard with its AC circuit breakers and protective relays is omitted from the new design, a new protection philosophy that fulfills class requirements is needed for selectivity and equipment protection. ABB has proposed a solution for protecting the DC distribution system using a combination of fuses and controlled turn-off semiconductor power devices. Because all energy-producing components have controllable switching devices, the fault current can be blocked much faster than is possible with traditional circuit breakers with associated protective relays. Although this approach offers a faster response during a short circuit, it does not fit well in system independent building philosophies.

== Safety and selectivity ==
The electrical power requirements of vessels are expanding as systems are expected to support power converters capable of integrating alternative sources and storage systems – including wind and solar power – and battery storage with a range of voltages, frequencies and power levels. DC links are ideal for this, but cannot be safely deployed without the necessary protection. Proper selection of protective devices (such as a DC breaker switch, high-speed fuse, or a circuit breaker) and their allocation according to distribution protection zones enables system integrators to achieve protection selectivity.

The protection device(s) closest to the fault location should isolate the fault before the protection devices at healthy zones are triggered. That is, they operate only on faults within their zone of protection and do not ordinarily sense faults outside that zone. If a fault occurs outside the zone, fault current can flow through, but the protection device(s) will not operate for this through-fault. As a result, the fault location is isolated, enabling the unaffected zones to remain operable.

Protection selectivity is achieved once the correct type of device has been chosen and the correct location at distribution protection levels. Selectivity between two protection devices can be complete (the load-side device provides protection without making the other device trip) and partial (the load-side device provides protection up to a given level of over-current, without making the other device trip). These protection devices come with a certain price tag, but the cost is justified thanks to the mitigation of any potential damage to a critical piece of equipment, or expensive system downtime and losses in production resulting from a fault.

== Fast fault interruption with solid state technology ==
A solid-state DC breaker switch is able to interrupt the full short-circuit current in microseconds. With such a time constraint, an autonomous switch control system must ensure local fault protection, without the need for external control or fault detection. This technology provides maximum flexibility for onboard DC grids and provides protection against short-circuit currents in any part of the grid. In addition to rapid over-current protection, the breaker should be programmed to open to a time-current profile in case of an overshoot. This enables the overall system to reconfigure the behavior of the DC breaker switch within certain predefined boundaries and according to applied ship rules. The fast opening time of a solid-state breakers limits the fault current considerably and minimizes the negative impact on the load. The current does not reach damaging levels and can be interrupted without forming an arc. Voltage reversal is therefore not required.

== Safe and redundant closed bus operations ==
Traditional (DP) systems are often designed for open bus mode, meaning completely separated power systems. A closed bus system is a more complex and tightly integrated system, which is demanding to build, verify and operate safely. Solid-state switching technology enables system integrators to design smarter solutions with equivalent safety. It contributes to save on fuel and maintenance costs and reduce the environmental footprint. It also enables a significant reduction in engine hours. Approval of a closed bus requires validation of the fault tolerance of the connected system, including live short-circuit testing of worst-case failure modes.

== See also ==
- Electric boat
- Diesel–electric powertrain
