= Solar Splash =

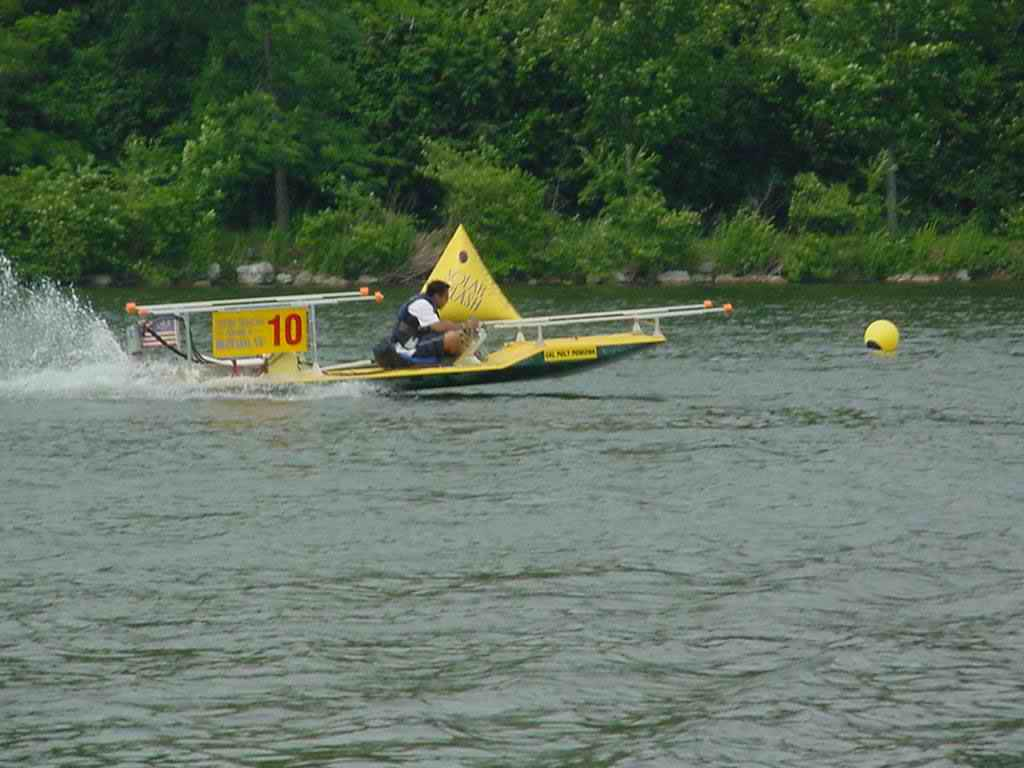
Cal Poly Pomona Solar Powered Race Boat for 2002 Solar Splash Competition in Buffalo, New York

Solar Splash is an intercollegiate solar/electric boat competition dedicated to showing the feasibility of solar energy.

An annual collegiate solar boating competition started in 1994. The competition includes three parts, a slalom race, a sprint, and an endurance race. In addition to race results the competition is scored based on a technical report and presentation. The 2007 contest was hosted by the City of Fayetteville, Arkansas, and the University of Arkansas College of Engineering. It took place June 13–17. Since 2017 the event has been hosted in Springfield, Ohio.

== See also ==
- Formula E
