= E5 Project =

Japanese marine design consortium

e5 Lab Co., Ltd.
- Industry: Commercial ship design
- Founded: August 2019; 6 years ago
- Headquarters: Chiyoda, Tokyo, Japan
- Number of locations: 1 (2020)
- Key people: Satoshi Ichida (CEO); Tomoaki Ichida (President)
- Services: Planning and design of electric/hydrogen cell commercial ships
- Total assets: ¥50,000,000 (capital)
- Website: Official website

The e5 Project (commercially registered as e5 Lab Co., Ltd., trading as e5 Lab Inc., and alternatively known as the e5 Consortium) is a Japanese consortium with the purpose of developing renewably-powered commercial ships.

== History ==
Founded in August 2019, the e5 Project originally consisted of Asahi Tanker Co. Ltd., Exeno Yamamizu Corporation, Mitsui O.S.K. Lines Ltd., and Mitsubishi Corporation. After founding, Idemitsu Kosan Co. Ltd., Tokio Marine & Nichido Fire Insurance Co. Ltd., and Tokyo Electric Power Company joined the partnership.

The name "e5" refers to the five "focus points" of the partnership: electrification, environment, evolution, efficiency, and economics.

In October 2019, the e5 powertrain design was certified for use by the Japanese Ministry of Land, Infrastructure, Transport and Tourism.

== Connectivity and software ==
=== Marine broadband project ===
In November 2019, e5 announced a collaboration with SoftBank Group to develop a marine broadband network. In the first trial, planned for January through May 2020, ships would "be equipped with flat antennas and local wireless stations", before a longer trial between January 2021 and March 2022 in which SoftBank and OneWeb will test a new satellite communication system designed to develop autonomous or remotely-controlled ships. The software was successfully trialled in February 2020.

The company tested new software designed to allow for the remote operation of ships on 11–12 November 2020.

== Ship design projects ==
Commercial ship design is the focal point of the e5 Project. It has completed its first two designs, the e5 Tanker and Tug, and is developing a third. Both completed e5 designs are capable of ship-to-shore power supply in the event of an emergency.

=== Tanker ===
e5 Tanker
Class overview
- Builders: Asahi Tanker Co. Ltd.
- Building: 2

General characteristics
- Tonnage: 499 tonnes
- Length: 62 metres (203 ft)
- Beam: 10.30 metres (33.8 ft)
- Draft: 4.15 metres (13.6 ft)
- Installed power: 3.48 MWh Orca Energy Storage System battery
- Propulsion: Kawasaki Azimuth thruster; 2 × 300kW (main); 2 × 68kW (side)
- Speed: c. 10 knots
- Capacity: 1,280 cubic metres (45,000 ft^{3})

The e5 Tanker claims to be the first fully electric oil tanker, powered by a 3.5 MWh battery which is projected to "run non-stop for 10 hours on a half-capacity battery". The ship will include a high level of automation and will be charged using wind and solar energy to further reduce emissions that would be incurred in charging the ship.

Asahi Tanker Co. are currently constructing two ships of the e5 Tanker design, the first of which will be completed by March 2022 and the second in March 2023, revised from an original completion target of 2021. The tanker is expected to mainly operate in Tokyo Bay.

Some commentators have called attention to the irony of an electric oil tanker, as the ships deliver fuel which causes pollution several times more severe.

=== Tug ===
e5 Tug
General characteristics
- Installed power: Hydrogen cell plant, lithium ion battery
- Propulsion: Azimuth thruster; 2 × 1500kW (main)
- Speed: 14 knots

By October 2019, e5 Lab had designed a tugboat that would run on a mixture of electricity and hydrogen fuel cells, produced with the advice of Tokyo Kisen. It will operate in Yokohama Port and Kawasaki Port and is expected to enter service in 2022.

=== Car carrier ===
The proposed car carrier, to be developed with the assistance of Mitsui O.S.K., would be powered by a mixture of liquefied natural gas and hydrogen cell generated electricity. Unlike e5 Lab's other projects, it would not be emission free, but would produce reduced emissions.
