= Trolley boat =

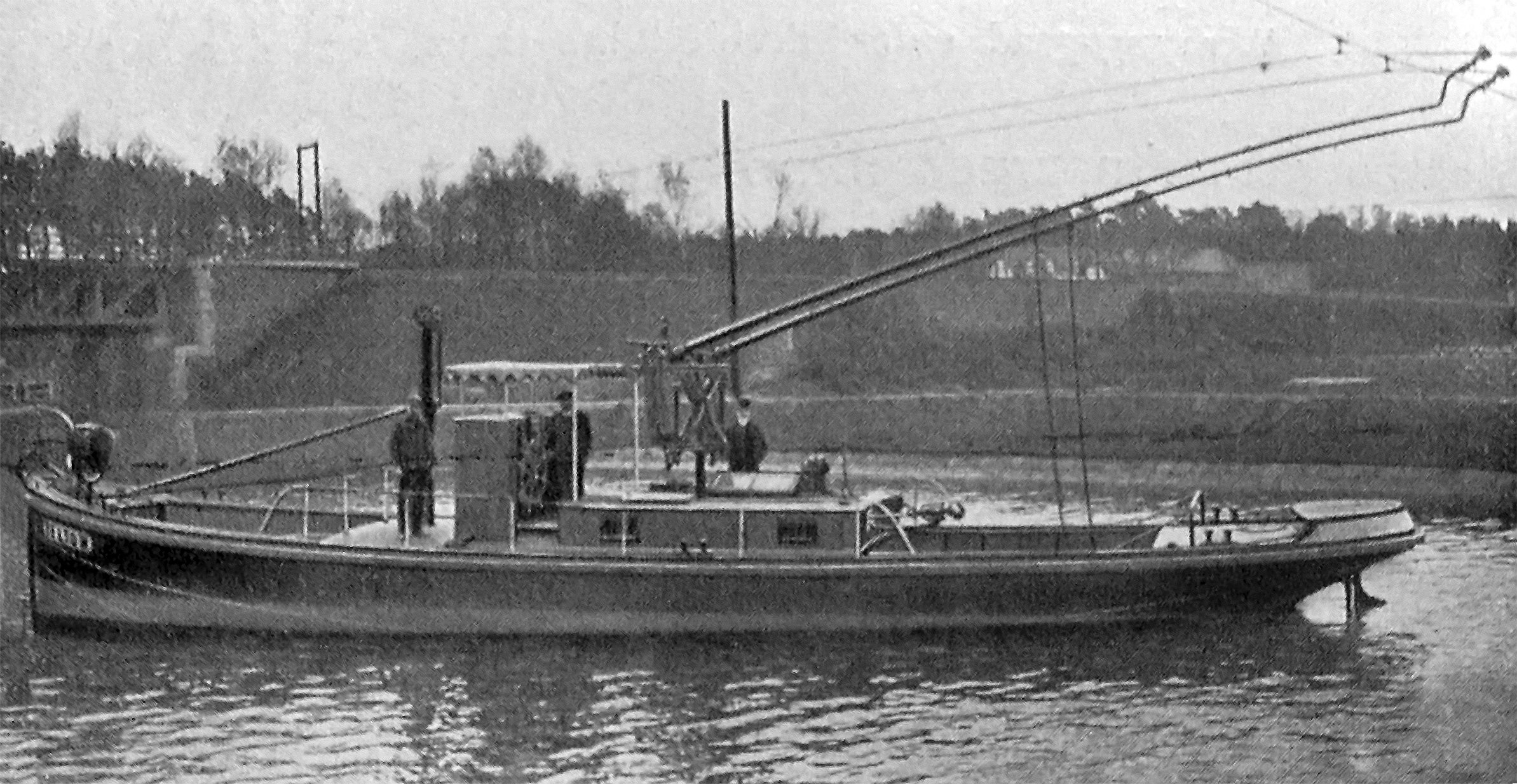
Teltow, a trolley boat on the Teltow Canal

A trolley boat (a descriptive neologism not used contemporaneously) is an electrically driven boat on canals and particularly in canal tunnels. It takes its energy like a tram or trolleybus from one or two overhead wires respectively.

== History ==
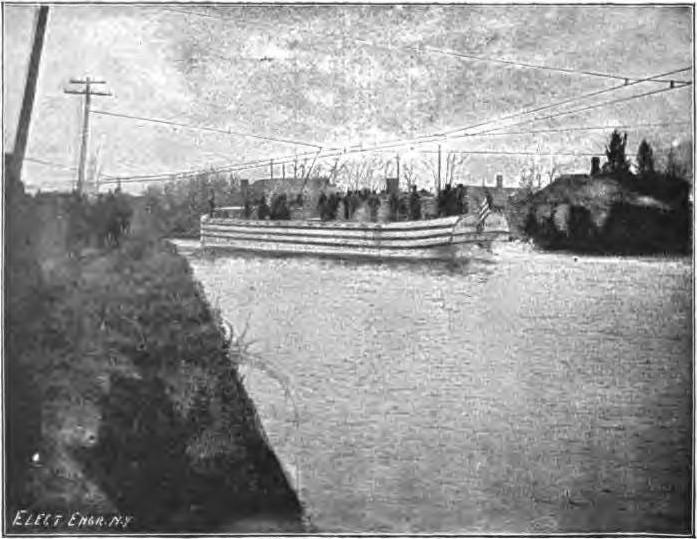
Demonstration of a trolley boat developed by Frank W. Hawley on the Erie Canal

Frank W. Hawley converted a conventional steam-driven canal boat into a trolley boat and demonstrated its benefits and limitations 1893 on the Erie Canal. It had two electric motors with 19 kW (25 hp) each, which drove the propellers.

On a 2 1/2 miles (4 km) long section of the Brussels–Charleroi Canal operated from 1899 a propeller driven trolley boat as a tug. Another installation was built in 1933 on a section of the Marne–Rhine Canal and is still in use. A 3 3/4 miles (6 km) long overhead cable was installed at the 2 miles (3,3 km) long canal tunnel of the Canal de Bourgogne in the French Canton de Pouilly-en-Auxois.

In 2012 Diversified Marine in Portland, Oregon built the new Buena Vista Ferry, which obtains its energy through an overhead cable, to connect Marion County and Polk County over the 220 meter wide Willamette River in Oregon. The Straussee Ferry is the last remaining trolley ferry in Germany, since the ferryboat of Haßmersheim was decommissioned in September 2014. It has a single wire overhead power supply.

== Additional photographs ==
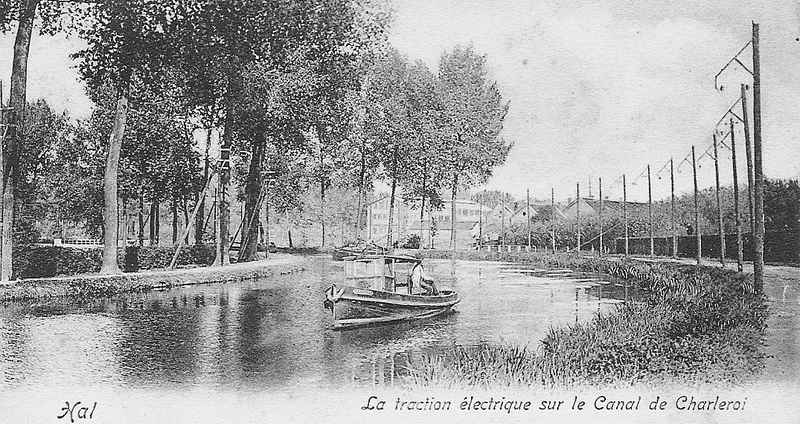
Trolley boat on the Brussels–Charleroi Canal

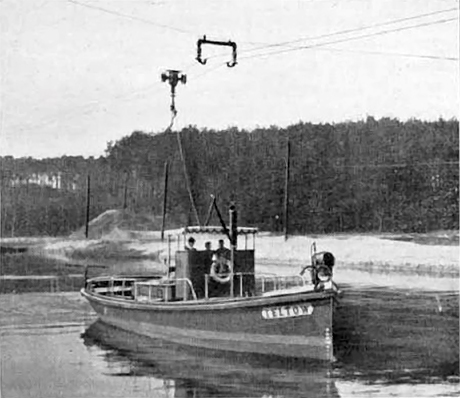
Teltow, a trolley boat on the Teltow Canal

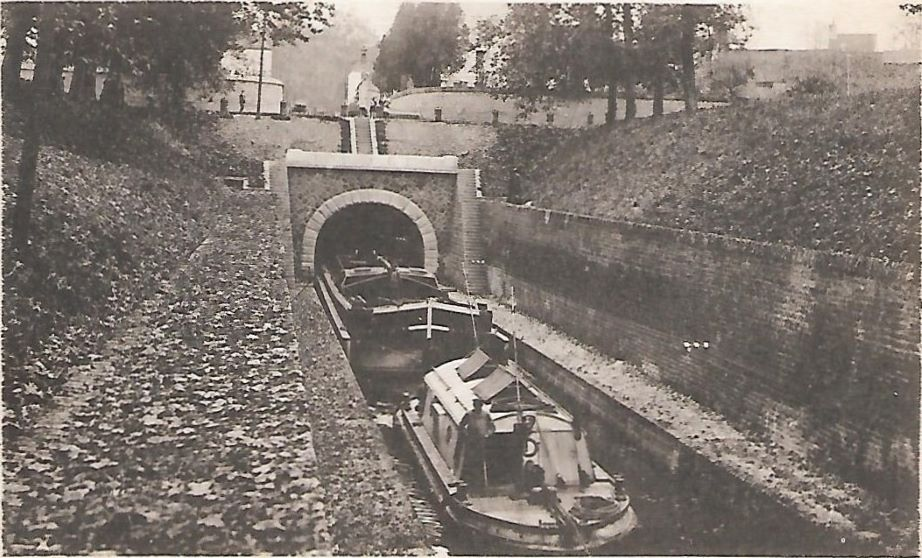
Trolley boat at the canal tunnel of Pouilly-en-Auxois
