= Aditya (boat) =

Ferry in Kerala, India

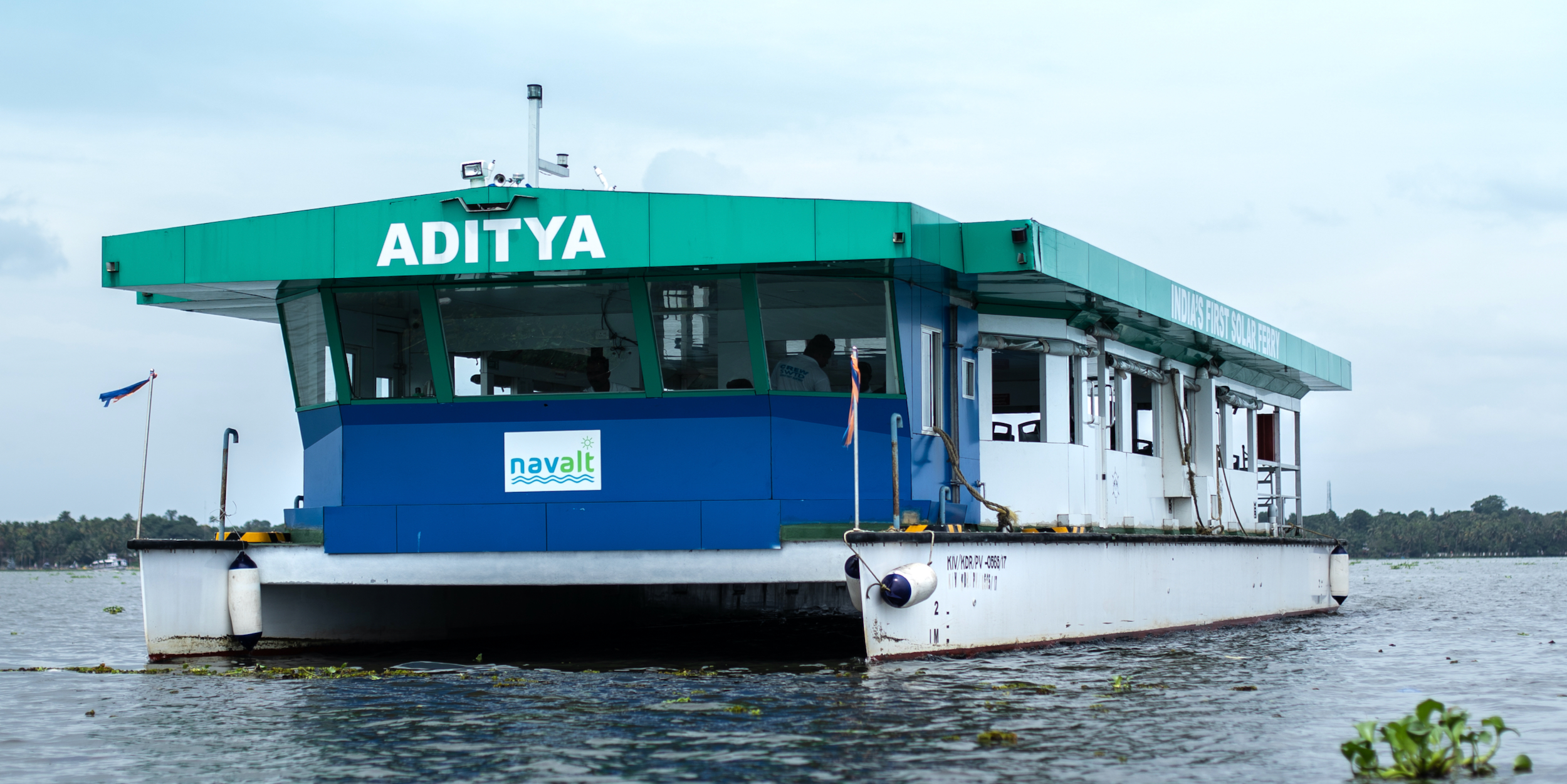

History

India
- Name: Aditya
- Owner: Kerala State Water Transport Department
- Operator: Kerala State Water Transport Department
- Port of registry: Kodungallur
- Route: Vaikom – Thavanakkadavu
- Builder: Navalt Solar and Electric Boats, Kochi, India
- Cost: ₹2 crore (US$370,000)
- Launched: 9 November 2016
- Completed: November 2016
- In service: 12 January 2017
- Status: In service

General characteristics
- Class & type: Indian Register of Shipping +IW ZONE 3 FERRY
- Displacement: 23 tonnes
- Length: 21 m
- Beam: 7 m
- Draught: 0.95 m
- Depth: 1.75 m
- Decks: Single
- Installed power: 2 × 9 kW (cruise); 2 × 20 kW (max)
- Propulsion: 2 Permanent-magnet asynchronous electric motors – 20 kW each @ 700 rpm
- Speed: 7.5 kn (max); 5.5 kn (cruise)
- Capacity: 75 passengers
- Crew: 3

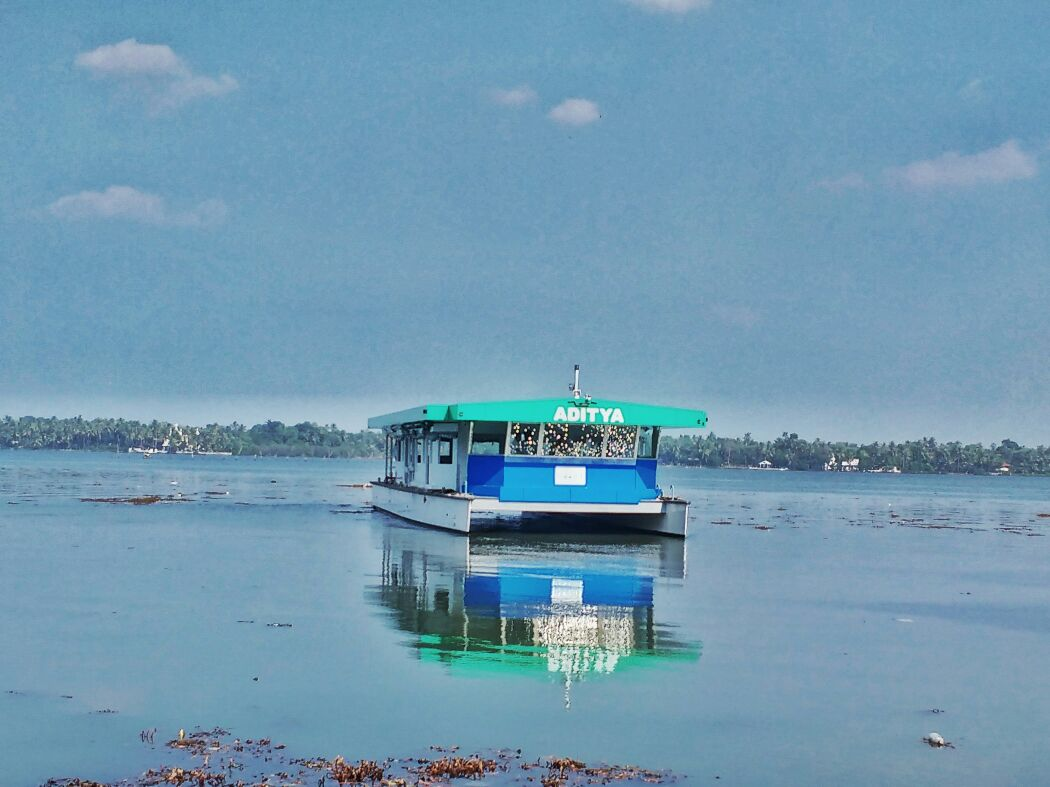
Aditya solar ferry in service

Aditya is a solar-powered ferry operating between Vaikom and Thavanakkadavu in the Indian state of Kerala. The boat was inaugurated by Kerala Chief Minister Pinarayi Vijayan and Union Minister for Power and Renewable Energy Piyush Goyal on 12 January 2017 at 5 pm.

It is India's first solar-powered ferry and was the largest such vessel until Indra (boat) was launched in 2023. The boat was designed and built by Navalt Solar and Electric Boats, Kochi — a joint venture between Navgathi Marine Design and Constructions, Alternative Energies (France) and EVE Systems (France).

== Development and background ==
- Initiated by the Kerala State Water Transport Department (KSWTD) to reduce fuel costs and emissions.
- Construction began in 2016 at Navalt's Kochi facility and was completed the same year for about ₹2 crore (US$370,000).
- Launched on 9 November 2016 and commissioned on 12 January 2017.
- A Public Interest Litigation filed on 20 June 2016 had claimed a solar ferry would be “impossible to operate”, but the project's success disproved this and later won multiple international awards.

== Design and construction ==
- Type: Catamaran passenger ferry
- Dimensions: 21 m × 7 m × 1.75 m (depth)
- Displacement: 23 tonnes
- Material: GRP hull / aluminium superstructure
- Registry: Kodungallur Port under Kerala Ports
- Classification: Built to Indian Register of Shipping rules for inland vessels (+IW Zone 3 Ferry)

The hull was developed using extensive CFD analysis by Navgathi and AltEn to optimise hydrodynamics. Construction and testing were witnessed by the Technical Committee, IRS surveyor and Kerala Port Surveyor on 16 November 2016 at Aroor backwaters.

== Technical features ==
- Solar array: 140 m^{2} roof panels rated 20 kW (≈ 80 kWh/day)
- Propulsion: 2 × 20 kW permanent-magnet motors (independent per hull)
- Performance: 7.5 kn max; 5.5 kn cruise
- Battery: 50 kWh lithium-ion + 9.6 kWh gel backup; 700 kg total
- Average power use: ~20 kW (16 kW cruise, 22 kW maneuvering)
- Operating cycle: ≈ 22 trips/day (5.5 h runtime)
- Charging: 32 A shore charger (~7 kW) overnight
- Monitoring: Real-time telemetry to Navalt servers for diagnostics and remote software updates

== Safety features ==
- Catamaran design ensures superior stability; can safely carry 200 passengers while meeting IMO stability standards.
- DNV-class approved propulsion batteries minimise thermal runaway risk.
- Multi-level safety system includes:
  - Warning for approaching temperature/voltage limits
  - Slowdown command when limits are reached
  - Automatic shutdown to prevent damage
- Independent dual propulsion trains allow safe return to shore in case of failure.
- Built under IRS inland vessel rules ensuring redundancy and safety compliance.

== Tests and trials ==
- Optimisation trials: 13–14 November 2016 – software fine-tuning with French experts.
- Builder trials: 15 November 2016 – system validation.
- IRS and Technical Committee trials: 16 November 2016 – maximum speed 7.4 kn @ 90% power; redundancy verified.
- Client trials: 25 November 2016 – attended by Transport Minister A. K. Saseendran and officials; performance approved.
- Site trials: Full-day Vaikom–Thavanakkadavu route, 22 trips completed successfully.

== Operational performance ==
Since entering service in January 2017, Aditya has continuously operated between Vaikom and Thavanakkadavu (2.5 km, 15 min per trip, 22 trips per day).

Performance highlights (2017–2025):

- 3.1 lakh litres of diesel saved
- ₹2.6 crore+ fuel cost savings
- 30 lakh+ passengers carried
- 740 tonnes+ of CO₂ avoided (~4,200+ trees equivalent)
- Average CO₂ reduction: ≈85 tonnes per year
- OPEX ≈ US$79/month (vs US$2,867 for diesel)
- Operational breakeven achieved in 2019
- First battery replacement completed in 2024

== Energy and efficiency statistics ==
Year	Passengers (million)	Diesel saved (L)	CO₂ avoided (t)	Distance travelled (km)
1	0.3	29,000	81	19,000
2	0.6	58,000	156	38,000
3	1.06	105,000	283	63,000
4	1.35	130,000	330	80,000
5	1.68	160,000	420	102,500
6	2.00	190,000	509	125,000
7	2.23	210,000	563	142,000
8	2.61	264,000	697	181,830

Average annual CO₂ saving ≈84.8 tonnes (≈3,856 trees, based on 22 kg CO₂/tree/year).

== Initial operation data ==
- First 60 days – 73.3 kWh/day, SOC 65%, grid charge ₹124
- 150 days – 73.7 kWh/day, SOC 60%, grid charge ₹163
- 1 year – 72.8 kWh/day, SOC 58%, grid charge ₹179 (~US$2.6)
- OPEX savings ≈₹25 lakh in Year 1

== Tender specifications ==
- Estimated daily energy need: 110 kWh (≈20 kW × 5.5 h)
- Solar generation: ≈80 kWh/day (1 kW → 4 kWh)
- Battery support: 50 kWh capacity (≈40 kWh usable)
- One trip ≈5 kWh → 22 trips/day = 1,650 passengers (≈580,000 per year)
- Operation window: 07:00–19:00 with optimised breaks
- Cloudy-day charging via 32 A shore charger adds ≈21 kWh in 3 hours

== Awards and recognition ==
- Winner – The 1st Gussies Electric Boat Awards (2020) – *Best Electric Ferry in the World*
- Solar Impulse Foundation – Efficient Solution Label (for eco-profitability)
- Listed among Significant Small Ships of 2017 by the Royal Institution of Naval Architects (UK)
- FICCI Catapult Award 2017 – Best R&D Project That Can Be Scaled Up

== Legacy and broader impact ==
- Aditya's success led KSWTD to plan conversion of all 48 diesel ferries to solar-electric systems.
- As of 2025, Navalt Solar and Electric Boats has 73 projects worldwide – 35 vessels in operation and 38 under construction.
- Geographic distribution: 68 in India (Kerala 47, Uttar Pradesh 6, Punjab 4, Maharashtra 3, Madhya Pradesh 2, six other states with 1 each), plus one each in Canada, Israel, Maldives and Seychelles.
- By sector: Tourism 43, Passenger Transport 19, Fishing 6, Vehicle Transport 2, Workboats 2.
- Navalt continues to expand with new models including Indra, Barracuda, Srav, Marsel and Destiny, and the Greenship modular platform for defence and commercial applications.

== See also ==
- Electric boat
- Solar Impulse – solar-powered aircraft
- List of solar-powered boats
