= Ujjwal DISCOM Assurance Yojana =

Indian government program

UDAY
- Mission statement: "Financial turnaround of Power Distribution Companies"
- Commercial?: Yes
- Location: India
- Owner: Supported by Ministry of Power (India)
- Founder: Centrally Sponsored Scheme
- Established: November 2015

Ujjwal DISCOM Assurance Yojana (UDAY) is the financial turnaround and revival package for electricity distribution companies of India (DISCOMs) initiated by the Government of India with the intent to find a permanent solution to the financial mess that the power distribution is in. It allows state governments, which own the DISCOMs, to take over 75 percent of their debt as of September 30, 2015, and pay back lenders by selling bonds. DISCOMs are expected to issue bonds for the remaining 25 percent of their debt.

== Launch ==
The scheme was announced by Piyush Goyal, Minister of State (IC) for Power, Coal & New and Renewable Energy (Now Railway minister and coal minister) in November 2015. The scheme is optional for the states to join. Jharkhand became the first state to come under uday scheme. Other states that have given their in-principle approval are Gujarat, Chhattisgarh, Andhra Pradesh, Karnataka, Rajasthan, Punjab, Haryana, Jammu and Kashmir, Himachal Pradesh, Madhya Pradesh, Uttarakhand, Telangana, Assam.

Recently Uttar Pradesh, Bihar, Maharashtra, Tamil Nadu and Mizoram joined, thereby making the total of 27 states to have joined. Till November 2017, only states that have not joined it are Odisha and West Bengal. Till now 31 states/UT have joined this scheme Mizoram being the 27th state to join. Lakshadweep joined the scheme on 28 February 2018, bringing the total of states and Union Territories covered to 32.
