= Ved Prakash Goyal =

Indian politician

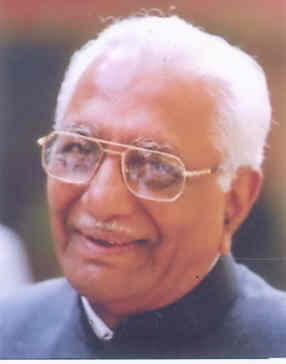

Union Minister of Shipping Government of India
- In office 1 September 2001 – 29 January 2003
- Prime Minister: Atal Bihari Vajpayee
- Preceded by: Arun Jaitley
- Succeeded by: Shatrughan Sinha

Member of Parliament, Rajya Sabha
- In office 3 April 1996 – 2 April 2008
- Constituency: Maharashtra

Personal details
- Born: 31 January 1926 Karnal, Punjab, British India (present-day Haryana, India)
- Died: 17 December 2008 (aged 81–82) Mumbai, Maharashtra, India
- Party: Bharatiya Janata Party
- Spouse: Chandrakanta Goyal
- Children: 2, including Piyush Goyal
- Education: B.Tech IIT-BHU

Ved Prakash Goyal (31 January 1926 – 17 December 2008) was an Indian politician and the Union Minister of Shipping in the Atal Bihari Vajpayee government in India from 2001 to 2003. He was the treasurer of Bharatiya Janata Party for a long time. He was a member of Rajya Sabha, the upper house of the Parliament of India. Piyush Vedprakash Goyal, the Minister of Commerce and Industry, Consumer Affairs, Food and Public Distribution, Textiles in the Government of India is the son of Ved Prakash Goyal.

== Early life ==
He was born in 1926 in Karnal in British Punjab and passed B.Sc. (Engg.). He was educated at Dayanand Anglo Vedic College, Lahore and at Banaras Hindu University.

== Personal life ==
He died from complications of brain tumor at the Hinduja Hospital in Mumbai on 17 December 2008.
