= List of solar-powered boats =

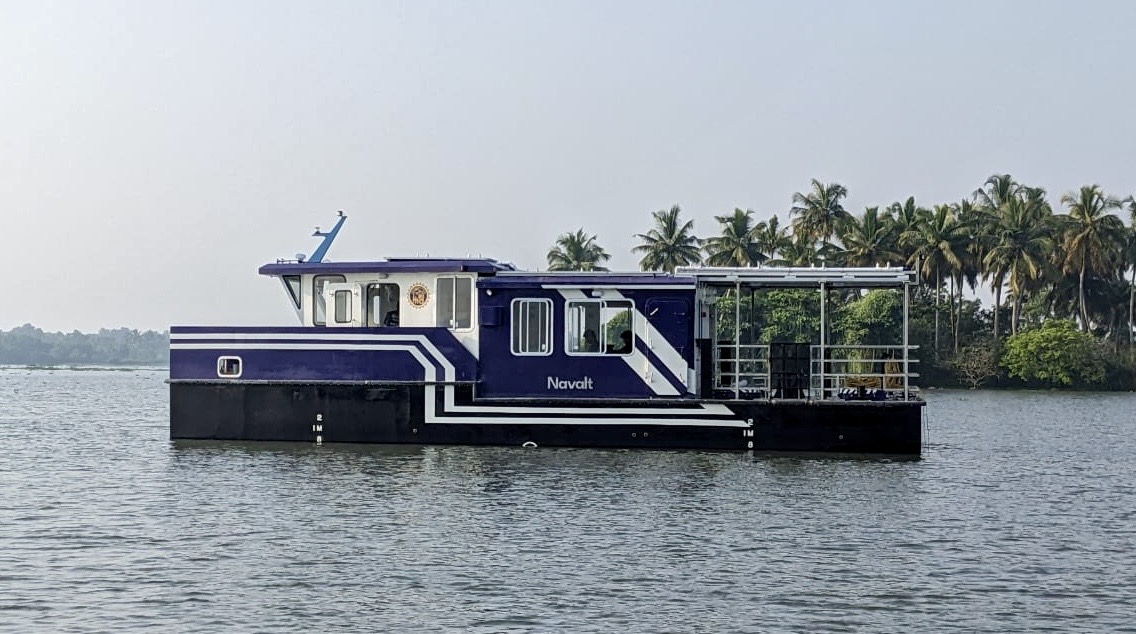
Barracuda India's fastest solar boat

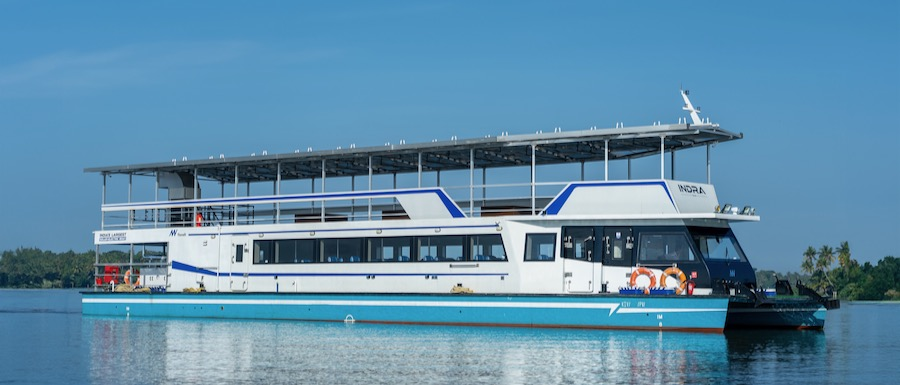
Indra India's largest solar boat

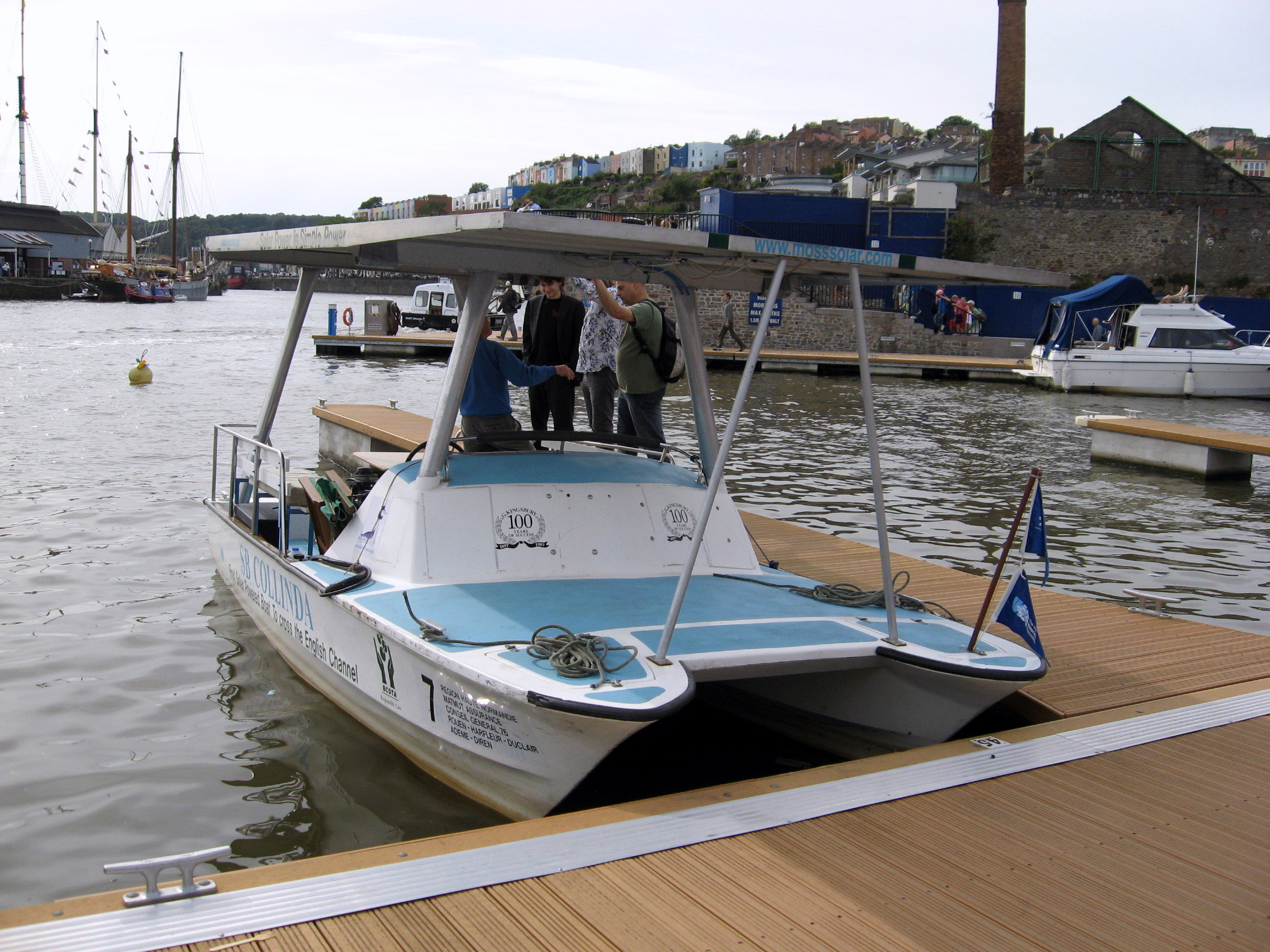
SB Collinda crossed the English Channel on solar power

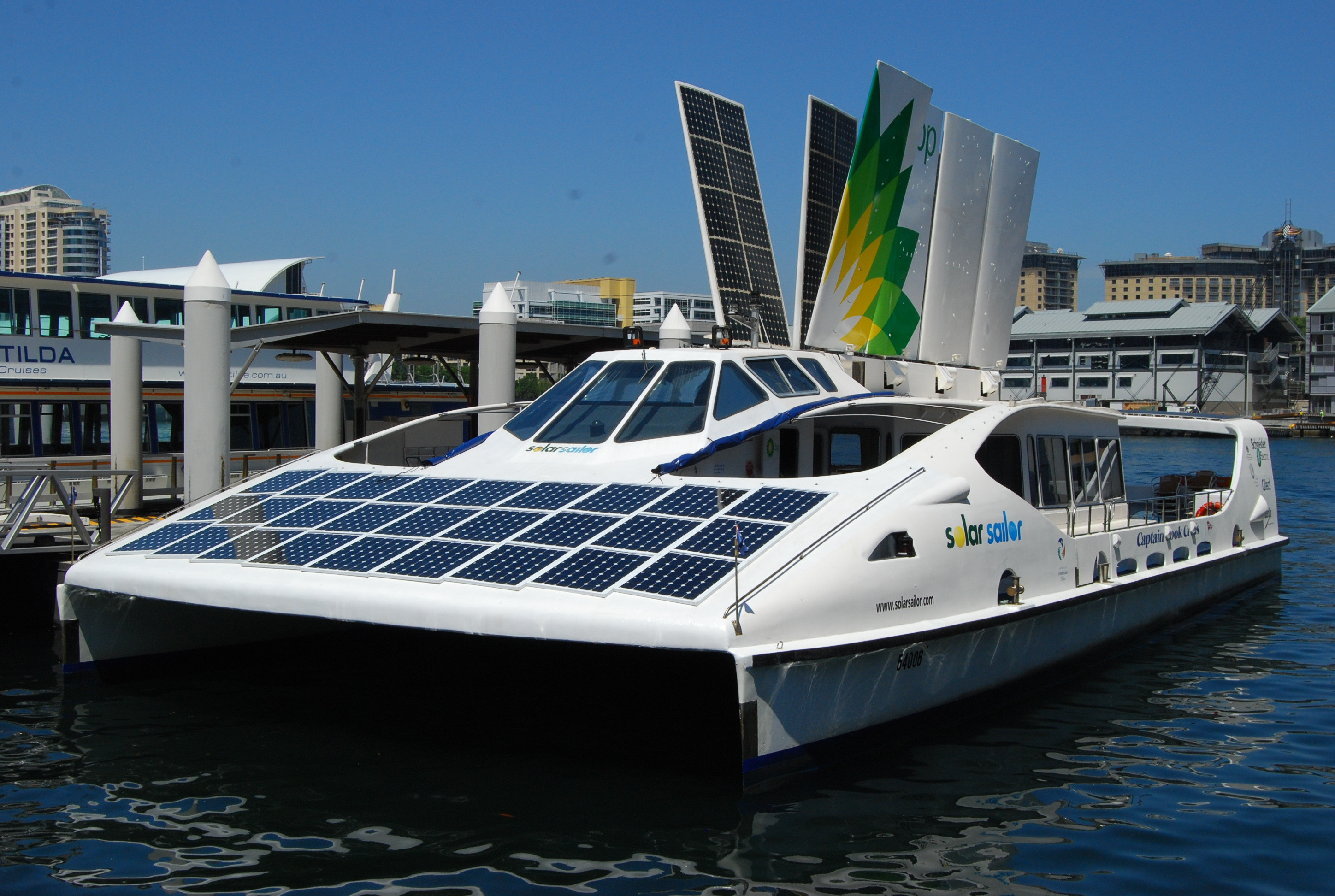
Solar Sailor of Australia

List of solar-powered boats is a list of boats powered by the sun, typically solar panels providing electrical power to motors.

- AMBER, by ELVENE, is self-sufficient with a top speed of 30 knots. Tested to reach 215 nautical miles without the need for external charging, thanks to the solar panels and efficient consumption.
- AMY, by ELVENE, combines high-speed performance with true energy autonomy, offering a compelling alternative to combustion-powered craft for both private and commercial use.
- Aditya, India's First Solar Ferry, 75 passenger boat is operating in Vaikom, Kerala, India.
- Alstersonne is a 27-metre, 42-tonne passenger ferry for 100 persons on the river Alster in Hamburg, Germany. As of year 2000 it was the largest solar-powered ship in the world.
- Avalon solar cruise boat at Thriprayar, Kerala. In operation since 2022.
- Barracuda, India's Fastest Solar-electric Boat, 12 passenger work boat is operating in Mumbai, Maharashtra, India. It was launched in Kochi in December, 2023.
- de:MobiCat - passenger catamaran for 150 passengers, in Switzerland. Used on Lake Biel since 2001
- FISH, by ELVENE, innovation award winner for the “best technical solution to decarbonise European fisheries,” is a workboat built specifically for small-scale coastal and inland commercial fishing removing fuel expenses, lowering maintenance and allows fishermen to operate without external charging infrastructure.
- Indra is the largest solar boat in India. It is a 27 m long, 7 m wide catamaran, double deck GRP boat with air-conditioned space for 100 passengers in the upper deck and open space for 100 passengers in the tier above. The boat started operations in Kochi waters in December, 2023.
- Iron, from Ecomarine BD, a 100% solar-powered catamaran having the international award in its customized/DIY electric boat's category. Made in Bangladesh, it has 50 passenger carrying capacity.
- Marina Solar Cruise (Marsel 1) at Akalapuzha, Kozhikode, Kerala. In operation since 2023.
- MS PlanetSolar, the first vehicle to circumnavigate the globe on solar power (2010–2012), first crossing powered by solar energy of the Indian Ocean, biggest solar boat in the world and first crossing of the red sea powered by solar energy
- Mundoo 3 is a riverboat in Australia, based on the Philip Bolger Tennessee design. An 11m solar electric version has been produced with a 16 kW motor and a top speed of 8-9 knots, featured in Wooden Boat magazine number 185.
- SB Collinda was the first solar powered vessel to cross the English Channel (in 1997).
- Solar Sailor shuttles passengers in Sydney harbor Australia.
- Sun21 sailed the Atlantic from Seville to Miami, and from there to New York. It was the first crossing of the Atlantic powered only by solar.
- The Firefly lar boat

== See also ==
- Electric boat
- Electric aircraft (including section on solar-powered aircraft)
- Solar Splash (Solar-powered boat race)
- Frisian Solar Challenge (Solar-powered boat race)
- List of large sailing vessels
- Human-powered watercraft
