= Chandrakanta Goyal =

Indian politician (1932–2020)

Member of the Maharashtra Legislative Assembly
- In office 1990–2004
- Preceded by: V. Subramanyam
- Succeeded by: Jagannath Shetty
- Constituency: Matunga

Personal details
- Born: 1932
- Died: 6 June 2020 (aged 88)
- Political party: Bharatiya Janata Party
- Spouse: Ved Prakash Goyal
- Children: Piyush Goyal

Chandrakanta Goyal (1932 – 6 June 2020) was an Indian politician and a member of the Bharatiya Janata Party. She was a member of Maharashtra Legislative Assembly from Matunga constituency three times, winning in 1990, 1995, and 1999. She was married to Ved Prakash Goyal (1926–2008) who was a minister in Atal Bihari Vajpayee's government. Their son, Piyush Goyal, is a minister in Modi ministry.

Chandrakanta Goyal died in June 2020, at the age of 88.
