= Matunga Assembly constituency =

Constituency of the Maharashtra legislative assembly in India

Coordinates: 19.030°N 72.855°E

Matunga
- Former constituency for the Maharashtra Legislative Assembly

Constituency details
- Country: India
- Region: Western India
- State: Maharashtra
- Established: 1952
- Abolished: 2008

Matunga is a former constituency of the Maharashtra Legislative Assembly. It was abolished when the constituency boundaries were re-arranged through 2008 delimitation bill.

== Members of Vidhan Sabha ==
Year	Member	Party
1952	Subramaniam Salivati	Indian National Congress
1957	Mane Madhavrao Ganpatrao	Praja Socialist Party
1957	Bhatankar Jagannath Ganpatrao (Sc)	Scheduled Castes Federation
1962	Liladhar Passu Shah	Indian National Congress
1967	Liladhar Passu Shah	Indian National Congress
1972	Kamla Raman	Indian National Congress
1978	Kohli Sohansingh Jodhsingh	Janata Party
1980	V. Subramnian	Indian National Congress
1985	V. Subramnian	Indian National Congress
1990	Chandrakanta Goyal	Bharatiya Janata Party
1995	Chandrakanta Goyal	Bharatiya Janata Party
1999	Chandrakanta Goyal	Bharatiya Janata Party
2004	Jagannath Achanna Shetty	Indian National Congress

== Election results ==
=== Assembly Election 2004 ===
2004 Maharashtra Legislative Assembly election : Matunga
Party	Candidate	Votes	%	±%
INC	Jagannath Achanna Shetty	48,266	43.48%	▲6.95
BJP	Babubhai Bhawanji	43,610	39.29%	▲0.94
SP	Mohammad Zubair Lakadawala	12,771	11.51%	New
BSP	Kuntal Abhishek	2,821	2.54%	▲1.43
Margin of victory		4,656	4.19%	▲2.38
Turnout		1,11,005	45.97%	▲2.46
Total valid votes		1,11,001		
Registered electors		2,41,488		▲8.17
INC gain from BJP		Swing	▲5.14	

=== Assembly Election 1999 ===
1999 Maharashtra Legislative Assembly election : Matunga
Party	Candidate	Votes	%	±%
BJP	Chandrakanta Goyal	37,244	38.35%	▼1.50
INC	Upendra P. Doshi	35,485	36.54%	▲4.27
NCP	Niyaz Ahmed Vanu	14,302	14.73%	New
Independent	Babubhai Bhawanji	6,589	6.78%	New
BSP	Ramchandra Balikaran Gautam	1,082	1.11%	▼1.07
AIADMK	Geetha Dasarathan	743	0.76%	New
Margin of victory		1,759	1.81%	▼5.76
Turnout		97,125	43.50%	▼10.63
Total valid votes		97,125		
Registered electors		2,23,252		▲3.68
BJP hold		Swing	▼1.50	

=== Assembly Election 1995 ===
1995 Maharashtra Legislative Assembly election : Matunga
Party	Candidate	Votes	%	±%
BJP	Chandrakanta Goyal	46,443	39.84%	▲6.39
INC	Upendra P. Doshi	37,613	32.27%	▲2.13
JD	Kohli Sohansingh Jodhsingh	24,017	20.60%	▼9.11
BSP	Sardar Avtarsingh	2,544	2.18%	▲1.70
Independent	Ahire Namdeo Savliram	1,500	1.29%	New
Independent	Sayad Varisali Barkhati Bachhual	975	0.84%	New
Margin of victory		8,830	7.58%	▲4.26
Turnout		1,18,566	55.06%	▼40.84
Total valid votes		1,16,563		
Registered electors		2,15,334		▲111.46
BJP hold		Swing	▲6.39	

=== Assembly Election 1990 ===
1990 Maharashtra Legislative Assembly election : Matunga
Party	Candidate	Votes	%	±%
BJP	Chandrakanta Goyal	32,355	33.45%	▼2.17
INC	V. Subramnian	29,150	30.14%	▼12.56
JD	Kohli Sohansingh Jodhsingh	28,738	29.71%	New
Independent	Herbert D. Barretto	2,606	2.69%	New
DMM	Shaikh Raeen Habibulla Babu	1,584	1.64%	New
INS(SCS)	M. K. Eapen	626	0.65%	New
Margin of victory		3,205	3.31%	▼3.76
Turnout		97,887	96.13%	▲53.33
Total valid votes		96,713		
Registered electors		1,01,831		▼33.30
BJP gain from INC		Swing	▼9.24	

=== Assembly Election 1985 ===
1985 Maharashtra Legislative Assembly election : Matunga
Party	Candidate	Votes	%	±%
INC	V. Subramnian	27,149	42.70%	New
BJP	Rustom Tirandaz	22,654	35.63%	▲5.04
Independent	Ahmadji Mohammed Ibrahim	8,370	13.16%	New
Independent	Chandrakant Khanduji Kasbe	2,488	3.91%	New
Independent	Santosh Kumar	2,068	3.25%	New
Independent	Ramyash Maurya	418	0.66%	New
Margin of victory		4,495	7.07%	▼6.43
Turnout		64,434	42.20%	▲2.47
Total valid votes		63,583		
Registered electors		1,52,674		▲18.85
INC gain from INC(I)		Swing	▼1.38	

=== Assembly Election 1980 ===
1980 Maharashtra Legislative Assembly election : Matunga
Party	Candidate	Votes	%	±%
INC(I)	V. Subramnian	22,186	44.08%	▲29.96
BJP	Rustom Tirandaz	15,394	30.59%	New
JP	Kohli Sohansingh Jodhsingh	10,198	20.26%	▼38.69
INC(U)	Ranjeet Naik	2,334	4.64%	New
Margin of victory		6,792	13.50%	▼31.33
Turnout		51,040	39.73%	▼19.46
Total valid votes		50,329		
Registered electors		1,28,458		▲6.83
INC(I) gain from JP		Swing	▼14.87	

=== Assembly Election 1978 ===
1978 Maharashtra Legislative Assembly election : Matunga
Party	Candidate	Votes	%	±%
JP	Kohli Sohansingh Jodhsingh	41,568	58.95%	New
INC(I)	Bhat Padma Subha	9,956	14.12%	New
INC	Dadasaheb Baburao Chavan	9,887	14.02%	▼34.55
Independent	Tirandaz Rustom Sheriar	8,532	12.10%	New
Margin of victory		31,612	44.83%	▲18.38
Turnout		71,836	59.74%	▼6.29
Total valid votes		70,515		
Registered electors		1,20,247		▲45.66
JP gain from INC		Swing	▲10.38	

=== Assembly Election 1972 ===
1972 Maharashtra Legislative Assembly election : Matunga
Party	Candidate	Votes	%	±%
INC	Kamla Raman	26,037	48.57%	▲12.10
SWA	Narayan Dandekar	11,856	22.12%	▼11.54
INC(O)	P. K. Ganatra	9,485	17.69%	New
ABJS	Mangaldas Nathubai Manek	6,103	11.39%	▼6.43
Margin of victory		14,181	26.46%	▲23.64
Turnout		54,583	66.12%	▼2.05
Total valid votes		53,604		
Registered electors		82,553		▲17.17
INC hold		Swing	▲12.10	

=== Assembly Election 1967 ===
1967 Maharashtra Legislative Assembly election : Matunga
Party	Candidate	Votes	%	±%
INC	Liladhar Passu Shah	17,213	36.47%	▼12.15
SWA	V. R. Murthy	15,885	33.66%	New
ABJS	V. P. Thakkar	8,408	17.82%	▲10.16
RPI	D. R. Gadgil	5,687	12.05%	New
Margin of victory		1,328	2.81%	▼3.02
Turnout		48,997	69.55%	▲4.49
Total valid votes		47,193		
Registered electors		70,453		▲0.71
INC hold		Swing	▼12.15	

=== Assembly Election 1962 ===
1962 Maharashtra Legislative Assembly election : Matunga
Party	Candidate	Votes	%	±%
INC	Liladhar Passu Shah	21,258	48.62%	▲24.83
PSP	M. Madhavan	18,707	42.79%	▲15.26
ABJS	Sarojini Ramchandra Shevde	3,346	7.65%	New
Independent	Hardevkaur Pritamsing Mathuaru	409	0.94%	New
Margin of victory		2,551	5.83%	▲4.65
Turnout		45,052	64.40%	▼72.33
Total valid votes		43,720		
Registered electors		69,953		▼39.90
INC gain from PSP		Swing	▲21.10	

=== Assembly Election 1957 ===
1957 Bombay State Legislative Assembly election : Matunga
Party	Candidate	Votes	%	±%
PSP	Mane Madhavrao Ganpatrao	43,198	27.52%	New
SCF	Bhatankar Jagannath Ganpatrao (Sc)	41,334	26.34%	New
INC	Shah Liladhar Pasoo	37,345	23.80%	▼23.08
INC	Salve Shakuntala Chintaman (Sc)	35,065	22.34%	▼24.53
Margin of victory		1,864	1.19%	▼17.15
Turnout		1,56,942	134.83%	▲77.64
Total valid votes		1,56,942		
Registered electors		1,16,398		▲113.92
PSP gain from INC		Swing	▼19.35	

=== Assembly Election 1952 ===
1952 Bombay State Legislative Assembly election : Matunga Sion Koliwada
Party	Candidate	Votes	%	±%
INC	Subramaniam Salivati	14,588	46.87%	New
SP	Bhat, U. U.	8,880	28.53%	New
Independent	Desai, Ratilal Ichharam	3,254	10.46%	New
CPI	Sundaram, Ganpat	2,597	8.34%	New
Margin of victory		5,708	18.34%	
Turnout		31,122	57.20%	
Total valid votes		31,122		
Registered electors		54,412		
INC win (new seat)				
