= Kerala State Water Transport Department =

Indian state government department

- Type: Separate government department in the state of Kerala.
- Industry: Public transport ferry service
- Founded: 1968
- Headquarters: Alappuzha, Kerala, India
- Area served: Kerala
- Products: Passenger and Cargo Ferry
- Services: Operates 81 boats
- Owner: Transport Department, Government of Kerala
- Divisions: 13
- Website: http://swtd.kerala.gov.in/

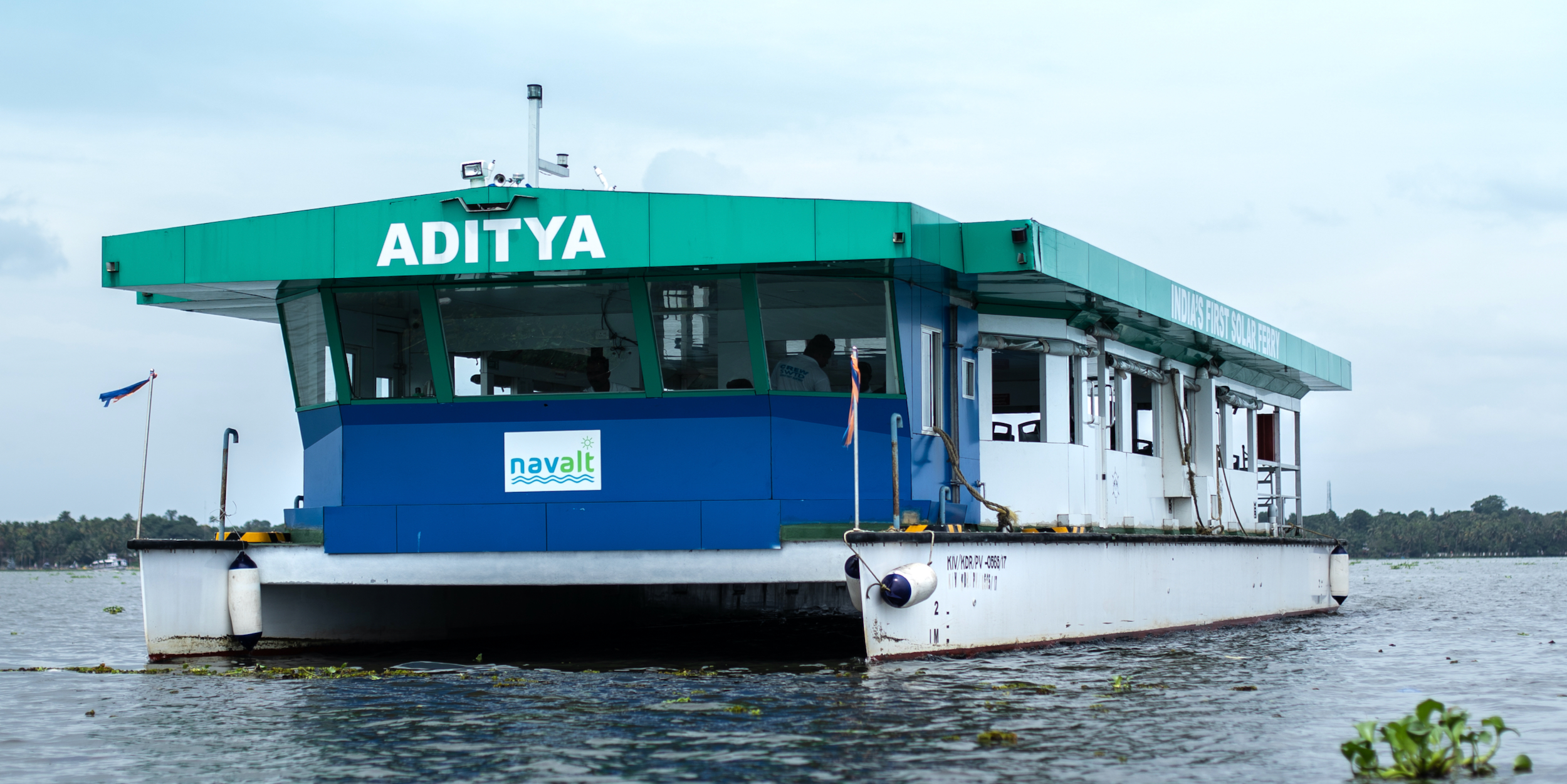
Aditya, India's first solar ferry

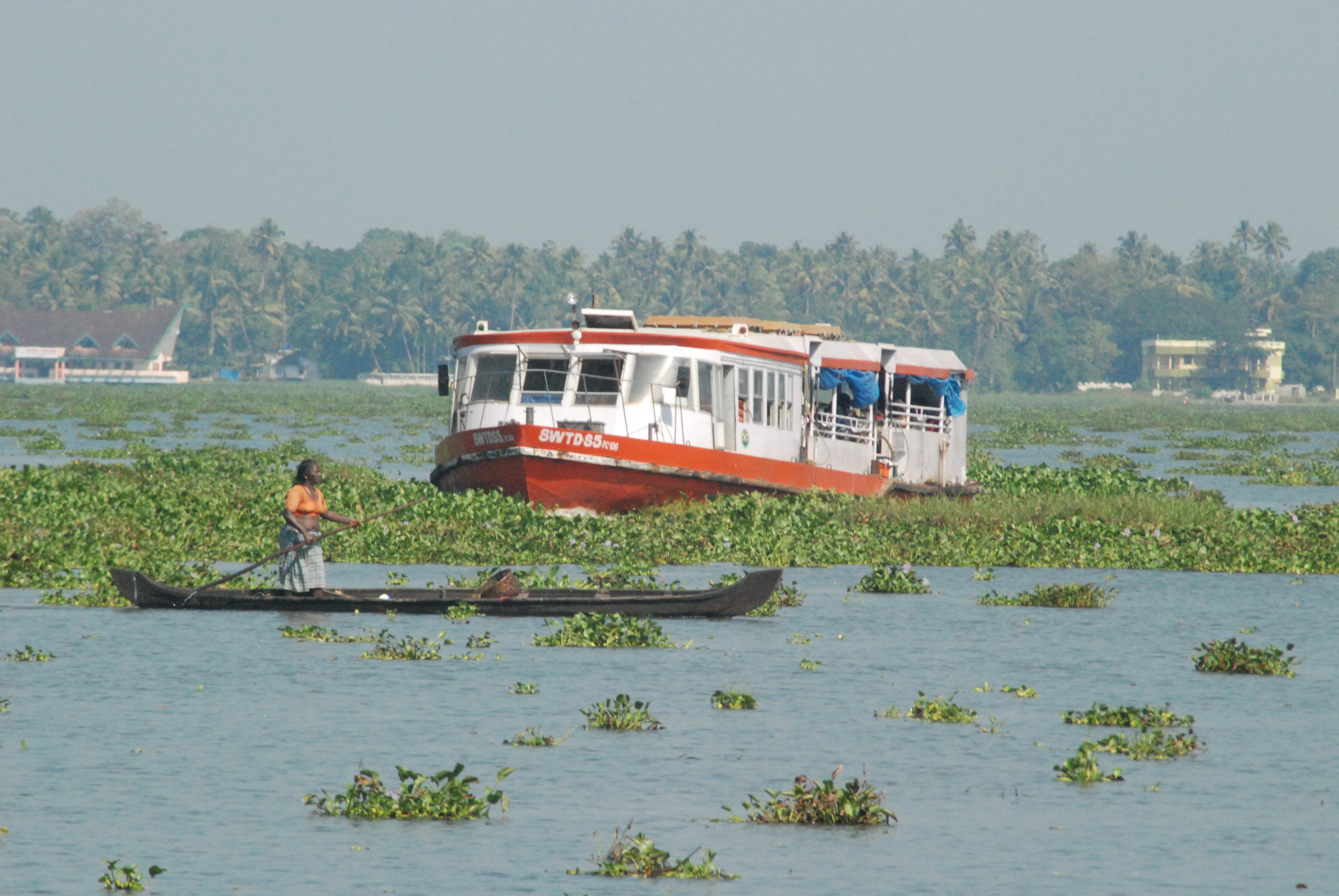
SWTD ferry on service in the Kerala Backwaters

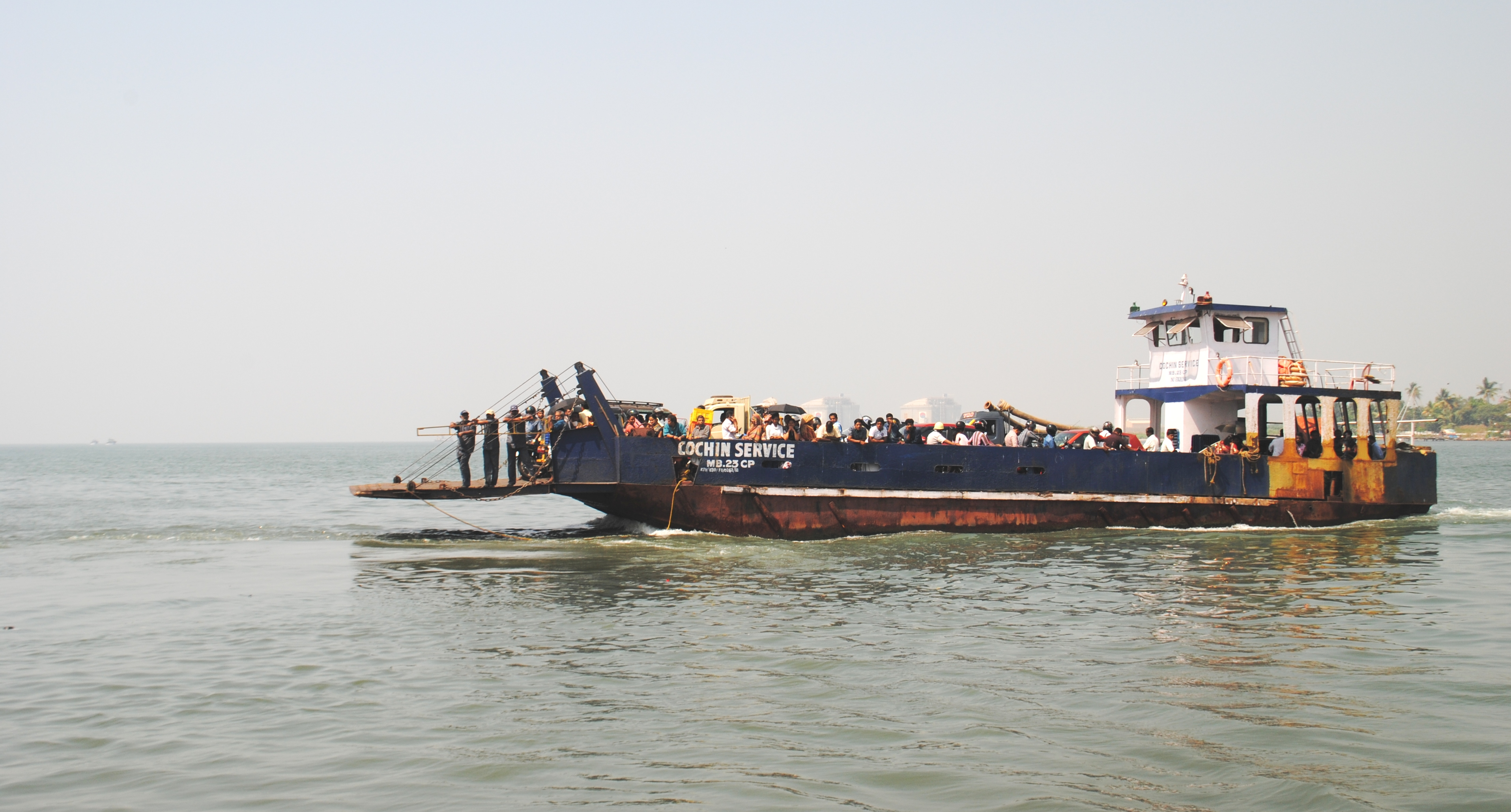
Junkar Service Fort Cochin

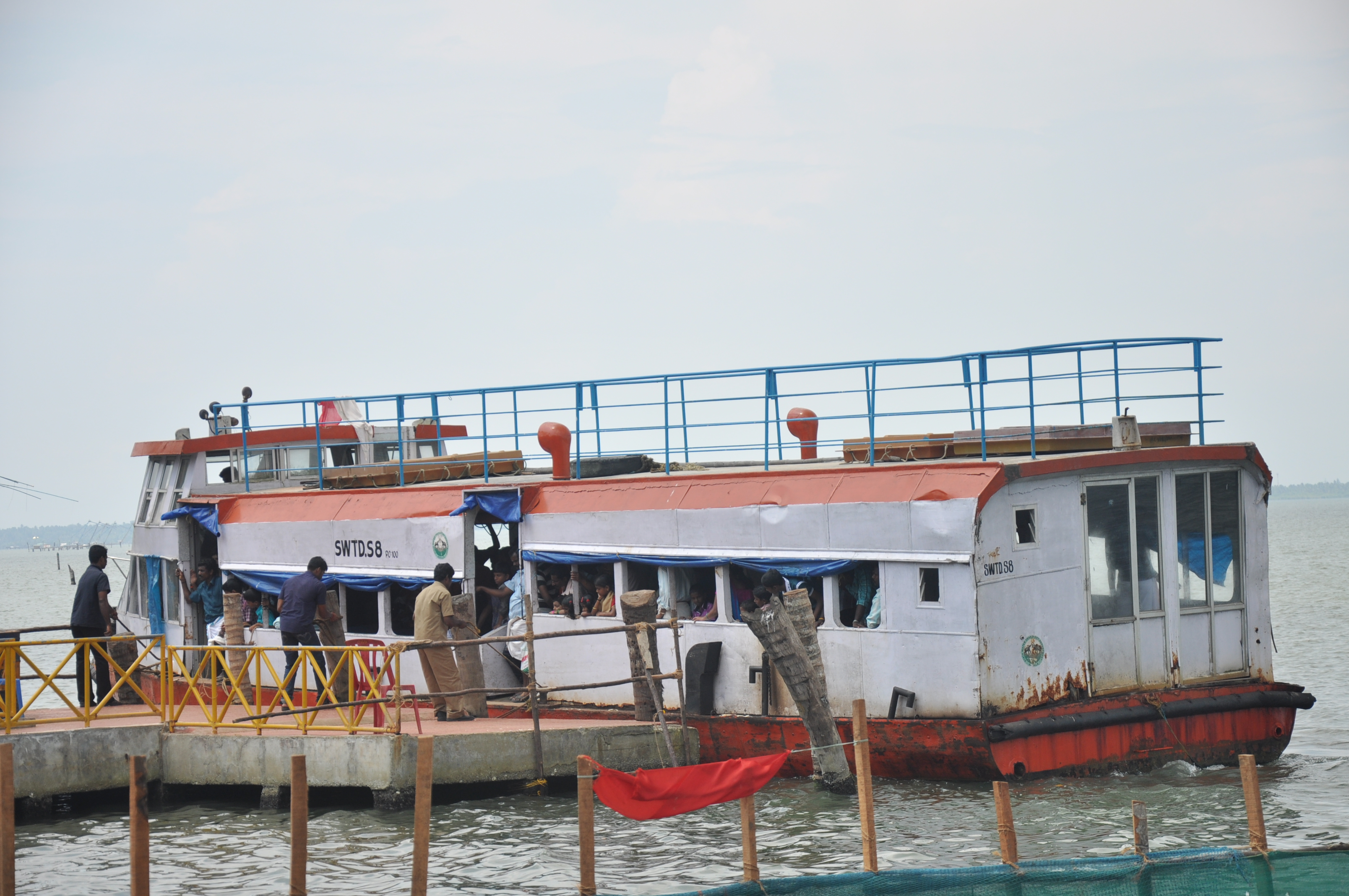
SWTD ferry at Ashtamudi Lake, disembarking passengers

Kerala State Water Transport Department (SWTD) is a governmental department that regulates the inland navigation systems in the Indian state of Kerala and provides inland water transport facilities. The department is headed by the State Minister in charge of transportation.

This system consists of 1895 kilometers of waterways, including navigable rivers, backwaters, and man made cross canals. Most of these are in Travancore-Cochin region. Of the 44 rivers in Kerala, 41 of the westward flowing rivers combine with back waters and man made canals to form an integral part of inland navigation system.

A study conducted in 2011-2012 by CPPR on Inland Water Transport in Kochi shows that around 56 percent of the passengers expressed their dissatisfaction over the quality of ferry service.

== Landmark projects ==
- Aditya (boat) - India's first solar ferry launched in 2017
- Vega - Kerala's fastest public transport ferry launched in 2018
- Kerala's first water taxi service launched in 2020.
- Indra (boat) - India's first solar cruise and largest solar boat launched in 2024

== External sources ==
Kerala Government Site
