= Piyush Goyal =

Indian politician (born 1964)

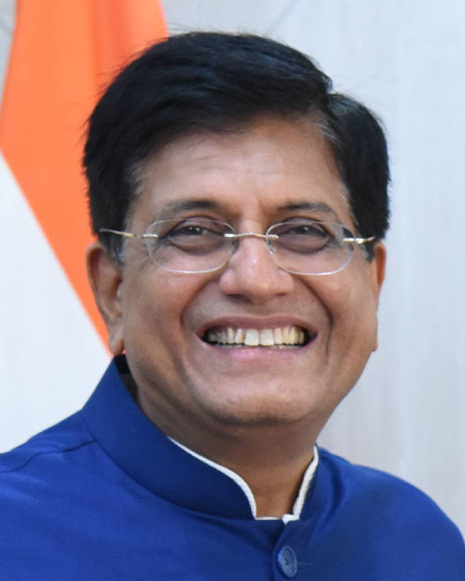
- Official portrait, 2024

8th Union Minister of Commerce and Industry
- Incumbent
- Assumed office 30 May 2019
- President: Ramnath Kovind; Droupadi Murmu
- Prime Minister: Narendra Modi
- Preceded by: Suresh Prabhu

Union Minister of Consumer Affairs, Food and Public Distribution
- In office 8 October 2020 – 10 June 2024
- President: Ramnath Kovind; Droupadi Murmu
- Prime Minister: Narendra Modi
- Preceded by: Ram Vilas Paswan
- Succeeded by: Pralhad Joshi

Union Minister of Textiles
- In office 8 July 2021 – 10 June 2024
- President: Ramnath Kovind; Droupadi Murmu
- Prime Minister: Narendra Modi
- Preceded by: Smriti Irani
- Succeeded by: Giriraj Singh

28th Leader of the House in Rajya Sabha
- In office 14 July 2021 – 4 June 2024
- Deputy: Mukhtar Abbas Naqvi (till 2022); Dharmendra Pradhan (from 2022)
- Chairman: Venkaiah Naidu (2021–22); Jagdeep Dhankhar (2022–24)
- Preceded by: Thawar Chand Gehlot
- Succeeded by: J. P. Nadda

Indian Emissary to the G20 & G7
- In office 7 September 2021 – 7 July 2022
- Prime Minister: Narendra Modi
- Preceded by: Suresh Prabhu
- Succeeded by: Amitabh Kant

Deputy Leader of the House in Rajya Sabha
- In office 12 June 2019 – 13 July 2021
- Leader: Thawar Chand Gehlot
- Chairman: Venkaiah Naidu
- Preceded by: Ravi Shankar Prasad
- Succeeded by: Mukhtar Abbas Naqvi

Union Minister of Railways
- In office 3 September 2017 – 7 July 2021
- Prime Minister: Narendra Modi
- Preceded by: Suresh Prabhu
- Succeeded by: Ashwini Vaishnaw

Union Minister of Coal
- In office 26 May 2014 – 31 May 2019
- Prime Minister: Narendra Modi
- Preceded by: Shriprakash Jaiswal
- Succeeded by: Pralhad Joshi

Union Minister of Finance & Corporate Affairs
- Acting
- In office 14 May 2018 – 23 August 2018
- Prime Minister: Narendra Modi
- Preceded by: Arun Jaitley
- Succeeded by: Arun Jaitley
- In office 23 January 2019 – 15 February 2019
- Prime Minister: Narendra Modi
- Preceded by: Arun Jaitley
- Succeeded by: Arun Jaitley

Union Minister of State (Independent Charge) for Mines
- In office 5 July 2016 – 3 September 2017
- Prime Minister: Narendra Modi
- Preceded by: Narendra Singh Tomar
- Succeeded by: Narendra Singh Tomar

Union Minister of State (Independent Charge) for New and Renewable Energy
- In office 26 May 2014 – 3 September 2017
- Prime Minister: Narendra Modi
- Preceded by: Farooq Abdullah
- Succeeded by: Raj Kumar Singh

Member of Parliament, Rajya Sabha
- In office 5 July 2010 – 4 June 2024
- Succeeded by: Nitin Patil
- Constituency: Maharashtra

Member of Parliament, Lok Sabha
- Incumbent
- Assumed office 4 June 2024
- Preceded by: Gopal Shetty
- Constituency: Mumbai North, Maharashtra

Personal details
- Born: Piyush Vedprakash Goyal; 13 June 1964 (age 62) Mumbai, Maharashtra, India
- Party: Bharatiya Janata Party
- Other political affiliations: National Democratic Alliance
- Spouse: Seema Goyal (m. 1991)
- Children: 2
- Parents: Ved Prakash Goyal (father); Chandrakanta Goyal (mother)
- Education: HR College (B.Com); Government Law College, Mumbai (L.L.B); Institute of Chartered Accountants of India (C.A)
- Occupation: Politician
- Profession: Chartered accountant; management consultant
- Website: www.piyushgoyal.in

Piyush Vedprakash Goyal (born 13 June 1964) is an Indian politician who is serving as the 13th Minister of Commerce and Industry since 2019, also being the longest serving minister for the same. He also served as Minister of Textiles and Minister of Consumer Affairs, Food and Public Distribution. He was elevated to the Cabinet Minister position on 3 September 2017. Formerly a Member of Parliament for Rajya Sabha from the state of Maharashtra, he is also the former Leader of the House in Rajya Sabha. Goyal was elected as member of 18th Lok Sabha representing Mumbai North Lok Sabha constituency. Goyal is the 2018 Carnot Prize Recipient for distinguished contributions to energy policy.

Earlier, he held the post of the National Treasurer of the Bharatiya Janata Party (BJP). He headed the BJP's Information Communication Campaign Committee where he oversaw the publicity and advertising campaign of the party including the social media outreach for the Indian General Elections 2014. Goyal has also held additional charge of Minister of Finance and Corporate Affairs twice in 2018 and 2019. Earlier he was Minister of State (Independent Charge) for Power, Coal, New & Renewable Energy (2014–2017), and Mines (2016–17).

== Early life and education ==
Goyal was born in Mumbai to Chandrakanta Goyal and Ved Prakash Goyal. His mother was a three-time Bharatiya Janata Party (BJP) Member of Legislative Assembly (MLA) from Maharashtra and his father served as the Union Minister for shipping in the Third Vajpayee ministry from 2001 to 2003. His father also served as the National Treasurer of the BJP for over two decades.

Piyush Goyal is a Chartered Accountant with All India Rank 2. He earned his degree in Law from Mumbai University. He did his schooling from Don Bosco High School, Matunga.

== Career ==
Goyal started his career as an investment banker and served on the board of India's largest commercial banks, the State Bank of India (2001–2004) and Bank of Baroda (2002–2004) as Government nominee.

Goyal was a member of the Standing Committee on Finance and the Consultative Committee for the Ministry of Defence. An active member of the Managing Committee of Indian Merchants Chamber, he is also involved with NGOs in diverse fields such as tribal education and welfare of the physically challenged (Jaipur Foot).

During his 35-year-long political career, he has served on the National Executive and held several important positions in the BJP including the national treasurer. He was also nominated by the Government of India to the Task Force for Interlinking of Rivers. He was the Dy. Campaign In-charge for the Parliament elections in 1991 and played a key role at the central level in all elections since 2004.

=== Minister of State for Coal, Power, New and Renewable Energy (2014–17) ===
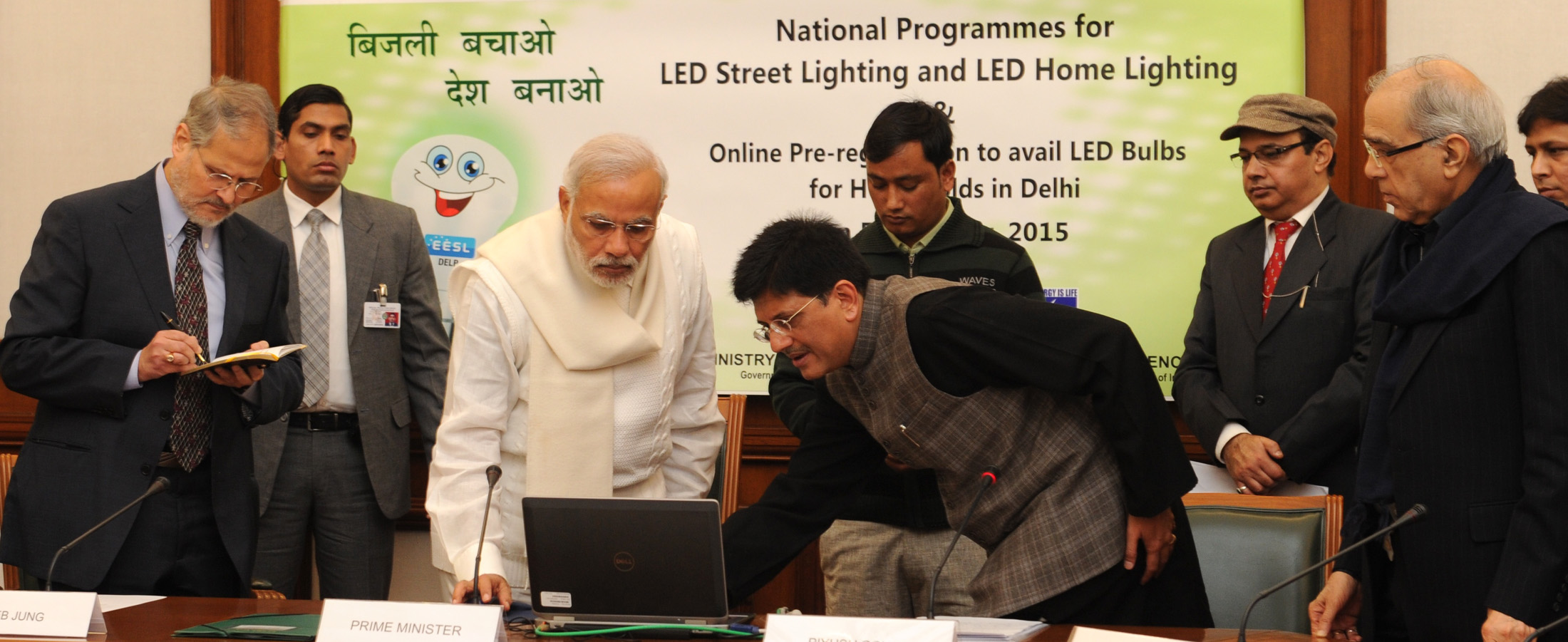
Minister Goyal along with PM Modi launching the National UJALA Programme for Street & Home Lighting

Goyal became the Minister of State for Power, Coal, New and Renewable Energy in the Modi government in 2014 and undertook multiple initiatives in his term. Under his tenure, India saw a proliferation of renewable energy through the world's largest renewable energy expansion program. Ministry under him accelerated the mission to provide 24X7 reliable electricity to all households and pushed towards the adoption of clean energy. He introduced the Ujwal DISCOM Assurance Yojana (UDAY) to revive debt-ridden power distribution companies and Deen Dayal Upadhyaya Gram Jyoti Yojana (DDUGJY) to improve India's energy access.

He initiated and completed the government program to electrify all the 18,000 remaining unelectrified villages of the country. He was awarded the 2018 Carnot Prize for distinguished contributions to energy policy and work in village electrification by the University of Pennsylvania's Kleinman Center for Energy Policy. He also worked for energy efficiency in the country through the Unnat Jyoti by Affordable Lighting for All (UJALA) scheme and reduced the prices of LED bulbs to ₹38 (41¢ US) per piece from ₹310 (US$3.30) in 2014. He revised the Government's target of 20 GW of solar power by 2022 to five times (i.e. 100 GW). Along with this, he also helped the cash-strapped state power distribution companies to turn around.

On 5 July 2016, during the second cabinet reshuffle of the Modi ministry, he was included in the cabinet and took over as the Minister of State for Mines (Independent charge) from Narendra Singh Tomar.

=== Minister of Railways (2017 – 2021) ===
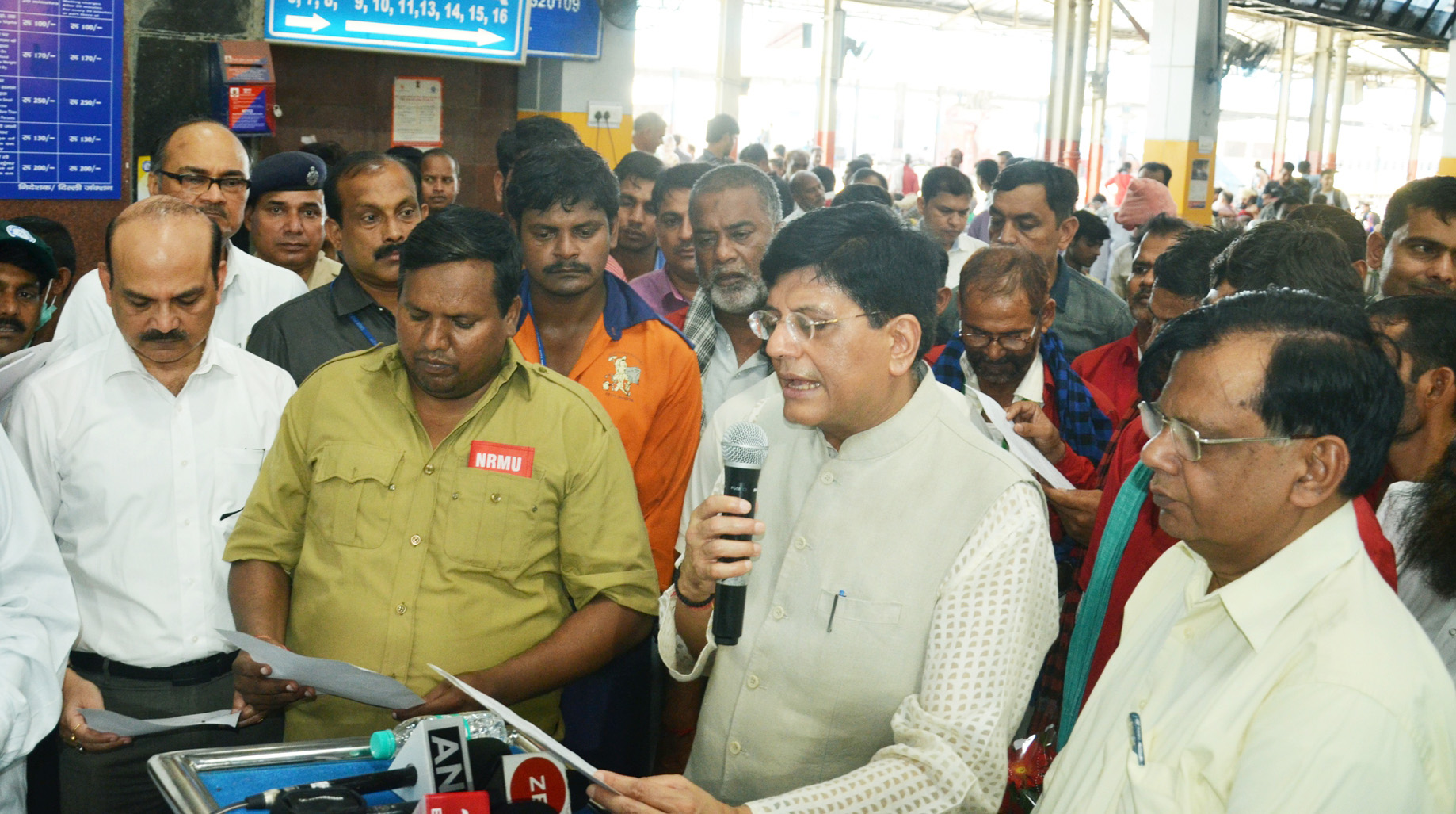
Minister Goyal administering the Swachhata pledge, on the occasion of the "Swachhata Hi Sewa" Abhiyan at Old Delhi Railway Station

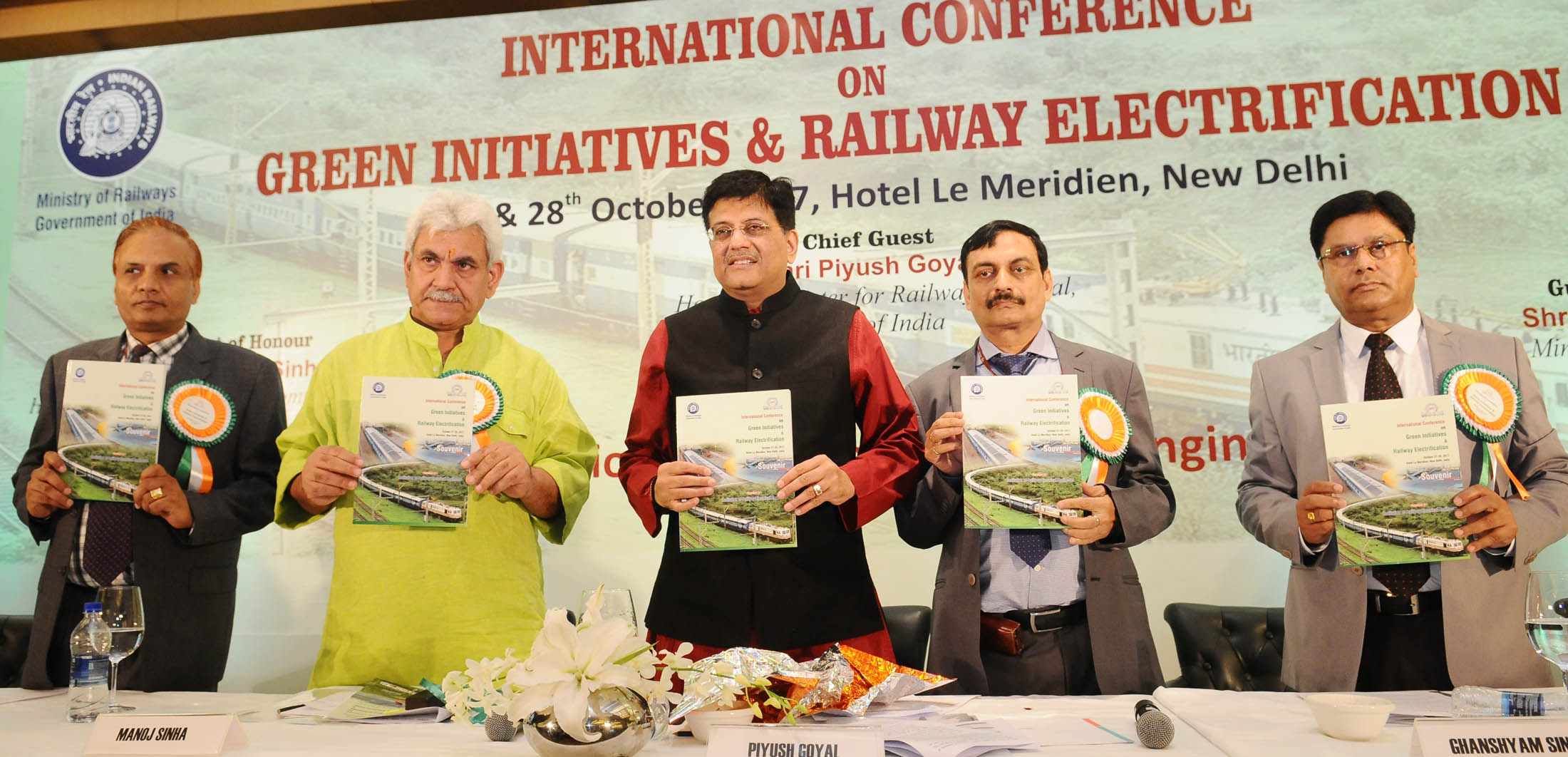
Minister Goyal releasing the souvenir at the inauguration of the International Conference on Green Initiatives & Railway Electrification

Goyal became the Minister of Railways on 3 September 2017 taking charge from Suresh Prabhu. Under his leadership, Indian Railways established a "Zero Accident" railway system and have seen no major accidents for the past 22 months. He started 'Plan Bee', a method to prevent elephants from approaching the railway lines. It involves setting up of devices near tracks, which emit the 'buzzing' sound of bees, saving elephants from train accidents.

He launched the first indigenous semi-high speed train Vande Bharat Express between Delhi and Varanasi. In all the mountain railways region of the country, Goyal introduced Vista-Dome coaches, in an attempt to allow the passengers to enjoy the scenery of the hilly terrains. On 27 February 2019, Piyush Goyal announced a Railway Zone for Andhra Pradesh named South Coast Railway with Waltair Division in Andhra Pradesh along with Guntur, Guntakal and Vijayawada Divisions with the headquarters of the zone being in Visakhapatnam, according to the AP Reorganisation Act 2014.

Goyal announced the 'Clone Train Scheme', wherein it planned to run a clone train with the train of the same number, to help and provide relief to the waitlisted passengers over heavy passenger traffic routes. For fighting climate change and making plastic-free India, he announced that tea will be sold in environment friendly 'Kulhads' (earthen cups) in place of plastic cups at all railway stations in the country.

From May through August 2018, he was temporarily given additional charge of Ministry of Finance during Arun Jaitley's absence for medical treatment. Goyal presented the 2019 Interim-Union budget of India in the Lok Sabha on 1 February 2019.

==== Coronavirus Pandemic ====
By taking advantage of the COVID-19 lockdown in India, the Indian Railways completed 200 key long pending projects. These projects, according to Railways officials, included three super critical projects with a combined length of 68 km, three critical projects with a combined length of 45 km, upgrading the entire 389 km railway line from Jhajha in Bihar to Pandit Deen Dayal Upadhyaya Junction in Uttar Pradesh, and a new 82 km port connectivity line to Paradip. Also during the COVID pandemic in India, Goyal directed Indian Railways to develop an anti-COVID-19 coach to contain the spread of coronavirus. This anti-COVID-19 coach had hands-free water tanks and flushes; and copper-coated handles and locks.

During the second wave of the pandemic in India, to overcome the scarcity of Oxygen, the railways under him ran an Oxygen Express to transport medical oxygen as well as the oxygen cylinders. As of 7 May 2021, the Indian Railways had run "40 Oxygen Express [trains] with 161 tankers to deliver a record load of 2,511 metric tonnes of liquid medical oxygen."

=== Minister of Commerce & Industry (2019 – present) ===
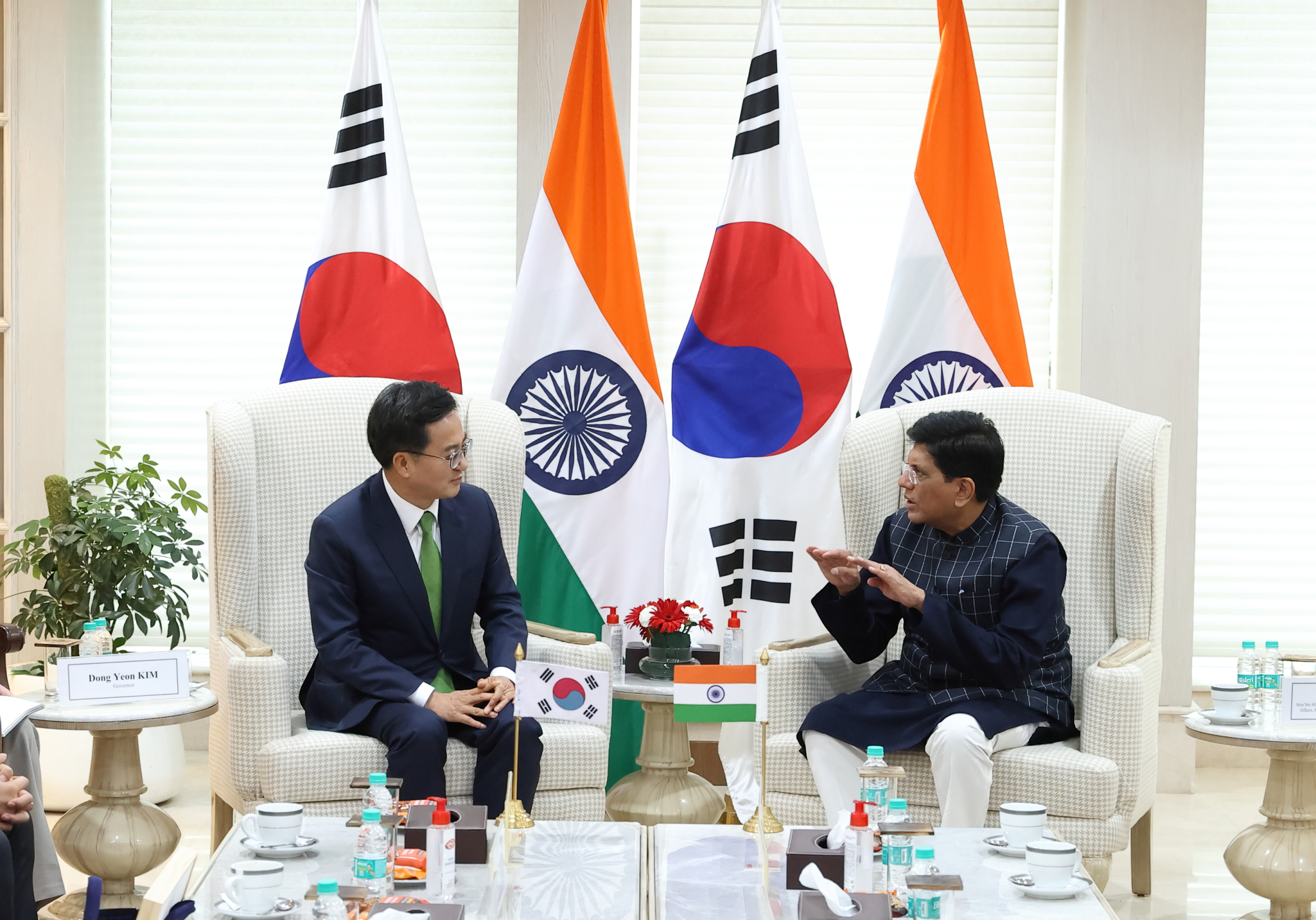
Kim Dong-yeon, Governor of Gyeonggi Province of South Korea and Goyal in 2023

In May 2019, Goyal continued at the Ministry of Railways and got the Ministry of Commerce and Industry. He aims to discard restrictive States Government policies pertaining to License Raj, Land Permissions, Foreign Investment Proposals, and Environmental Clearances. In a bid to systematise the onboarding process of retailers on e-commerce platforms, Goyal directed the Department for Promotion of Industry and Internal Trade (DPIIT) to utilise the Open Network for Digital Commerce (ONDC) to set protocols for cataloging, vendor discovery and price discovery. Goyal aims to provide equal opportunities to all marketplace players to make optimum use of the e-commerce ecosystem in the larger interest of the country and its citizen. Under Goyal's leadership in Jan 2021 India jumped 14 spots in World Bank's Ease of Doing Business rankings taking India to 63rd spot amongst 190 countries.

In a bid to Atmanirbhar Bharat, Goyal launched One District One Product (ODOP) initiative to fuel the economic growth and generate employment within India. The objective of ODOP is to convert each district of India into an export hub by identifying products with export potential in the respective district. Goyal inaugurated 'Prarambh' International Summit, an initiative by Startup India in New Delhi.

=== Leader of the House in Rajya Sabha (2021-2024) ===
In June 2019, he was appointed the Deputy Leader of the House in Rajya Sabha. In July 2021, Goyal was appointed the Leader of the House in Rajya Sabha succeeding his colleague Thawar Chand Gehlot.

=== Minister of Consumer Affairs, Food & Public Distribution (2020 – present) ===
After the demise of Ram Vilas Paswan, he took over the additional charge of the Ministry of Consumer Affairs Food & Public Distribution on 9 October 2020.

After taking charge, Goyal announced the strengthening and modernising of the Food Corporation of India. He also emphasised that the procurement system at Minimum support price (MSP) will continue and Food Corporation of India (FCI) will be committed to serving farmers. To ensure that all the migrant labor community can draw their allotted ration anywhere in the country Goyal called for speedy implementation of One Nation One Ration Scheme. At the 3rd Governing Council meeting of the Bureau of Indian Standards (BIS), Goyal directed to cut quality testing charges for MSMEs, Startups and Women Entrepreneurs.

Goyal also directed the Department of Consumer Affairs to focus and ensure on quality and quantity of products, processes and services to the consumers by way of the BIS Act, 2016 and Legal Metrology Act, 2009.

On 27 August 2026, Goyal stated that India plans to negotiate expanded market access in Japan for basmati rice and proposed food products during their trade agreement review.

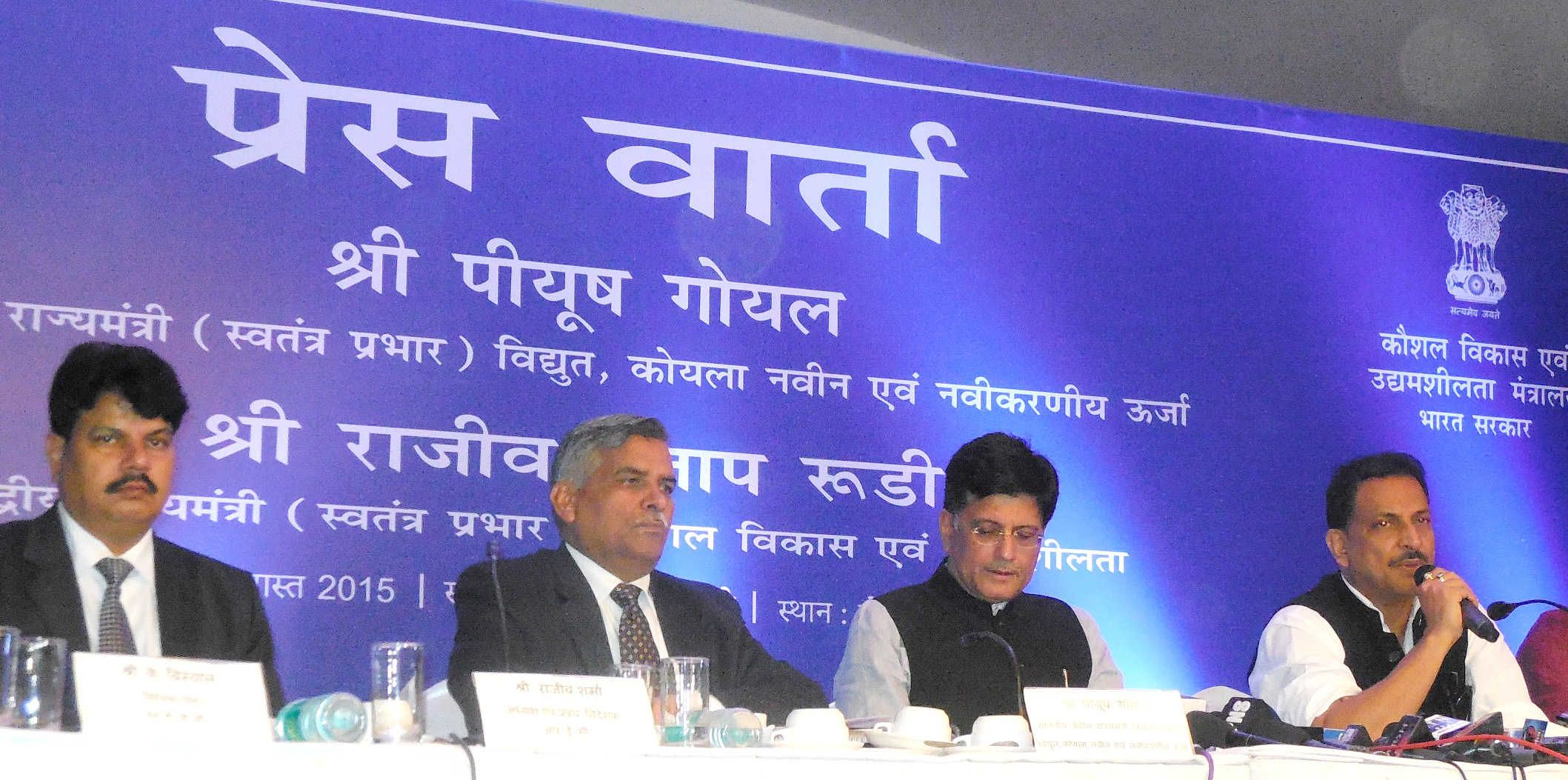
Minister Goyal addressing the media

== Electoral politics ==
He was elected as the Bharatiya Janata Party candidate from Maharashtra for the Rajya Sabha in 2010. He won as the BJP candidate for the Mumbai North constituency in the 2024 General Elections.

== Elections contested ==
=== Lok Sabha ===
Year	Constituency	Party	Votes	%	Opponent	Opponent party	Opponent votes	%	Result	Margin	%
2024	Mumbai North	BJP	680,146	65.68	Bhushan Patil	INC	322,538	31.15	Won	357,608	34.53

=== Rajya Sabha ===
Position	Party	Constituency	From	To	Tenure
Member of Parliament, Rajya Sabha	BJP	Maharashtra	5 July 2010	4 July 2016	5 years, 365 days
Member of Parliament, Rajya Sabha	BJP	Maharashtra	5 July 2016	4 July 2022	5 years, 364 days
Member of Parliament, Rajya Sabha	BJP	Maharashtra	5 July 2022	4 June 2024	1 year, 335 days

== Personal life ==
He is married to Seema Goyal, an active social worker, and they have two children.

== See also ==
- Third Modi ministry

Political offices
Preceded by Sriprakash Jaiswal	Minister of Coal; 26 May 2014 – 30 May 2019	Succeeded by Pralhad Joshi
Preceded by Jyotiraditya Madhavrao Scindia	Minister of Power (Minister of State with Independent charge); 26 May 2014 – 3 September 2017	Succeeded by R. K. Singh (Minister of State with Independent charge)
Preceded by Farooq Abdullah	Minister of New and Renewable Energy (Minister of State with Independent charge); 26 May 2014 – 3 September 2017	Succeeded by R. K. Singh (Minister of State with Independent charge)
Preceded by Narendra Singh Tomar	Minister of Mines (Minister of State with Independent charge); 5 July 2016 – 3 September 2017	Succeeded by Narendra Singh Tomar
Preceded by Suresh Prabhu	Minister of Railways; 3 September 2017 – 7 July 2021	Succeeded by Ashwini Vaishnaw
Preceded by Suresh Prabhu	Minister of Commerce and Industry; 30 May 2019 – Present	Incumbent
Preceded by Ram Vilas Paswan	Minister of Consumer Affairs, Food and Public Distribution; 8 October 2020 – Present	Incumbent
Preceded by Smriti Irani	Minister of Textiles; 7 July 2021 – Present	Incumbent
