= Oxygen Express =

Liquid medical oxygen train service

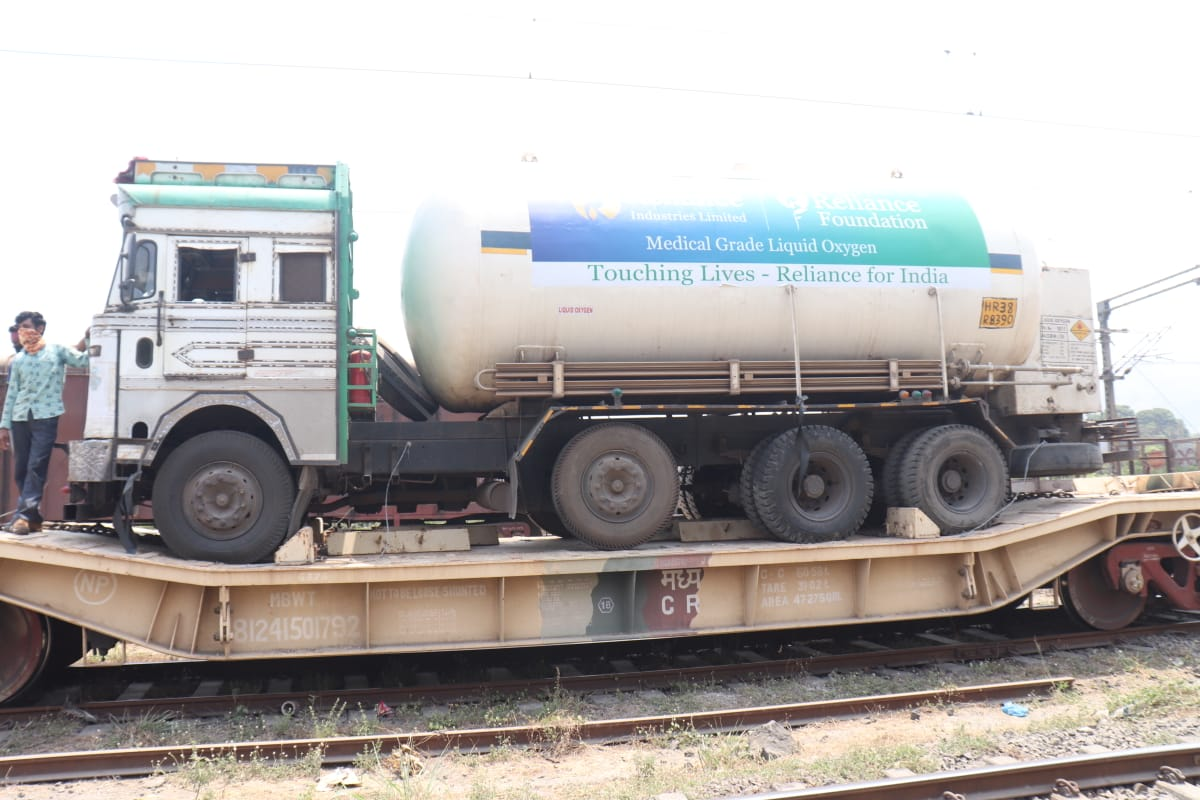
- Oxygen Express Ro-Ro Service at Kalamboli in Maharastra, 26 April 2021
- In service: MEDICAL PRODUCT transport
- Manufacturer: INOX
- Family name: Liquid Medical Oxygen trains
- Replaced: -
- Constructed: 2020
- Entered service: 2021
- Refurbished: -
- Formation: 2019
- Fleet numbers: 10
- Operators: Indian Railways
- Depots: Amingaon, Bengaluru, Jamshedpur, Mumbai, Tondiarpet, Vishakhapatnam

Oxygen Express was a series of long- and short-haul train services jointly operated by the Ministry of Railways and Indian Railways to overcome a severe shortage of medical-grade oxygen by supplying to various hospitals in different parts of India and Bangladesh during the second-wave of COVID-19 pandemic in India.

== Background ==
Oxygen Express trains were operated in two formats: by using cryogenic ISO tanks which can carry 16 metric-tonnes of liquid medical oxygen each; using fixed tankers on semis such as Tata Motors 1618s, which are then further loaded on to the trains at the roll-on/roll-off discharge facilities of the Indian Railways and Indian Army.

At the peak of pandemic, the trains ran on signal-free "Green Corridor" routes, transporting oxygen from various steel plants to various parts of the country.

In July 2021, 200 metric-tonnes of liquid medical oxygen were transported to the Benapole Border Crossing in Bangladesh, from the Tatanagar Junction railway station.

== Gallery ==
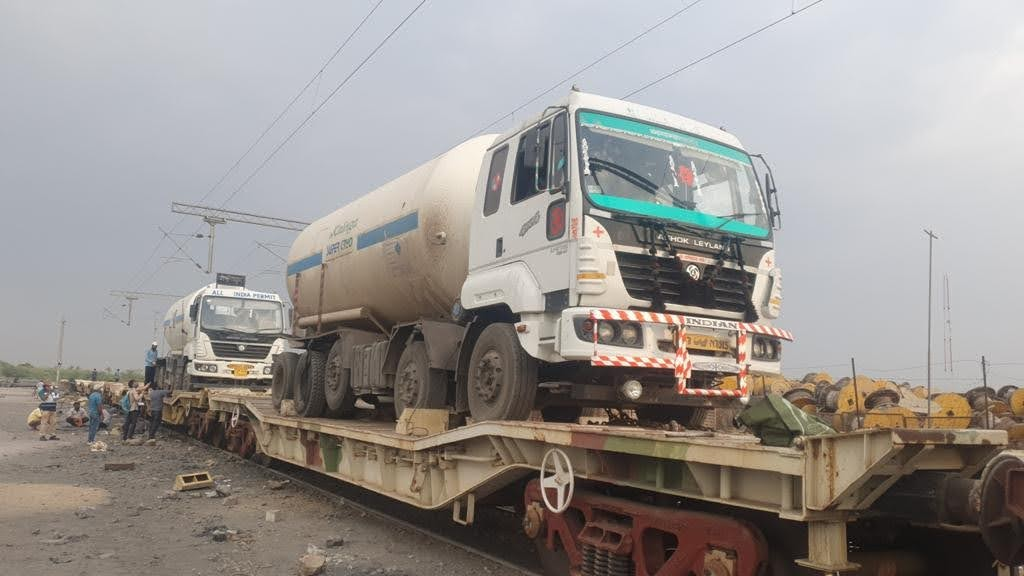
Western Railways' Oxygen Express Train with LMO tanker truck, 23 May 2021

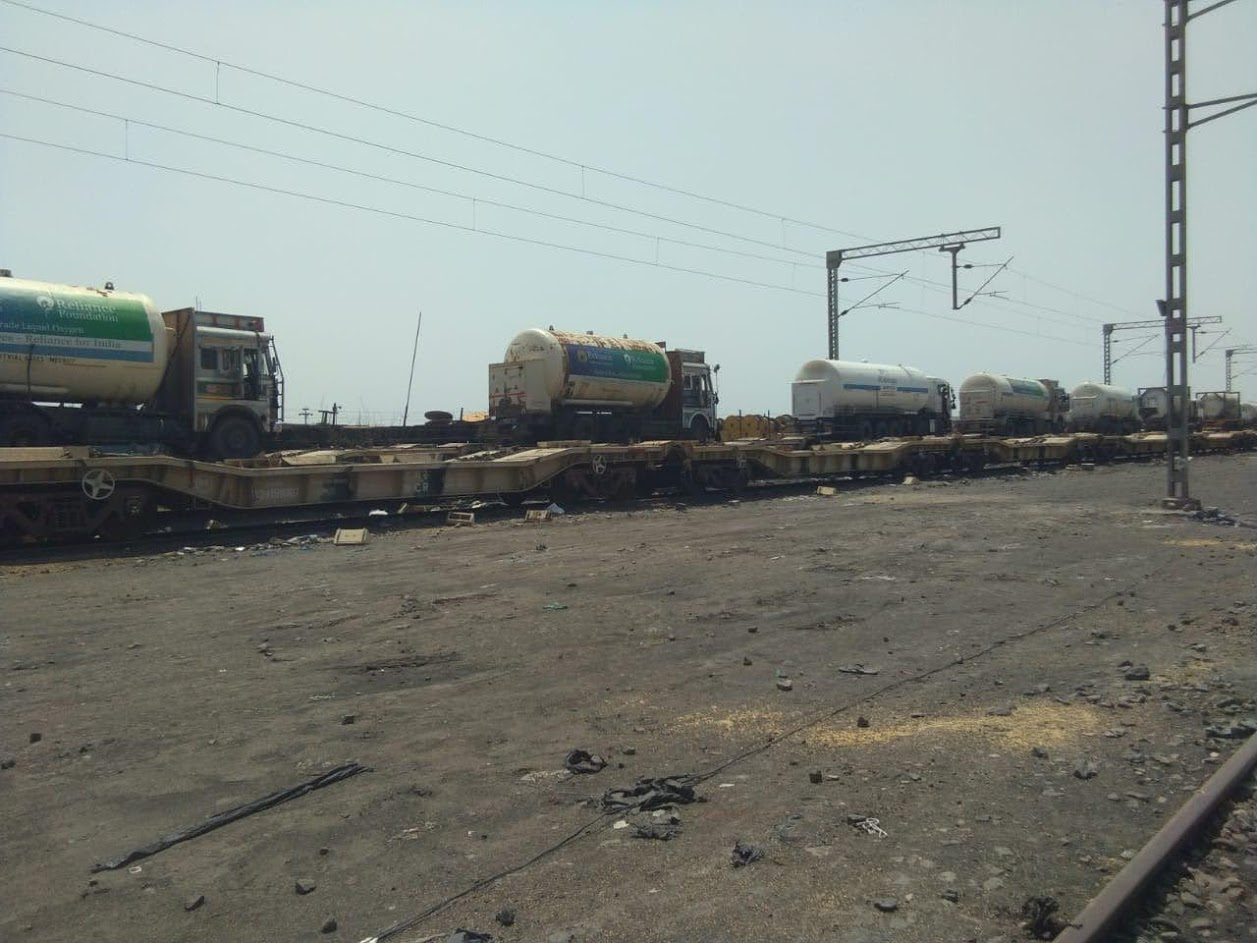
Western Railways' Oxygen Express Train with LMO tanker trucks from Hapa to Delhi, 23 May 2021

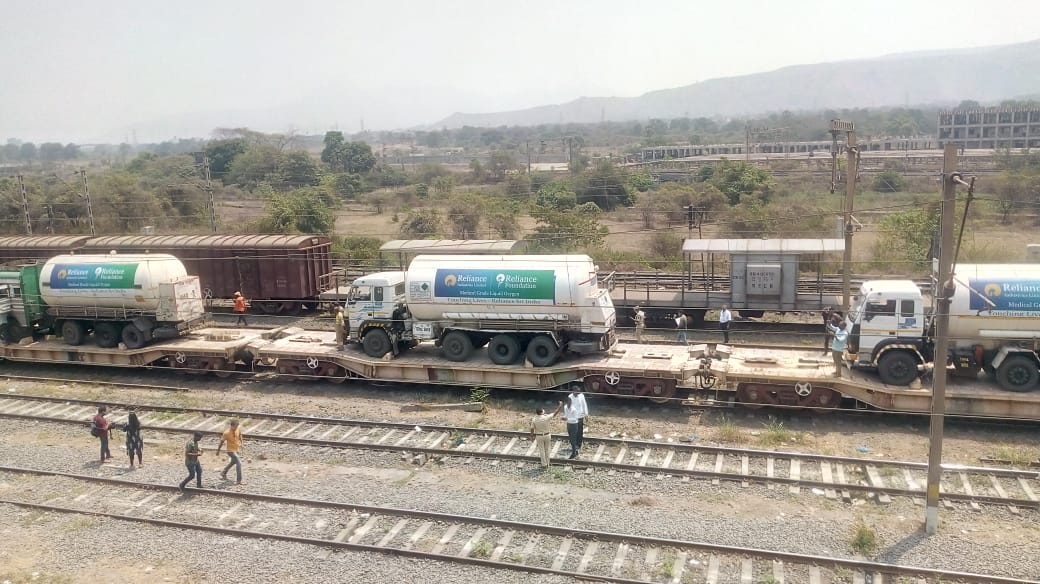
Oxygen Express carrying Reliance Foundation's tankers at Kalamboli in Maharastra, 26 April 2021

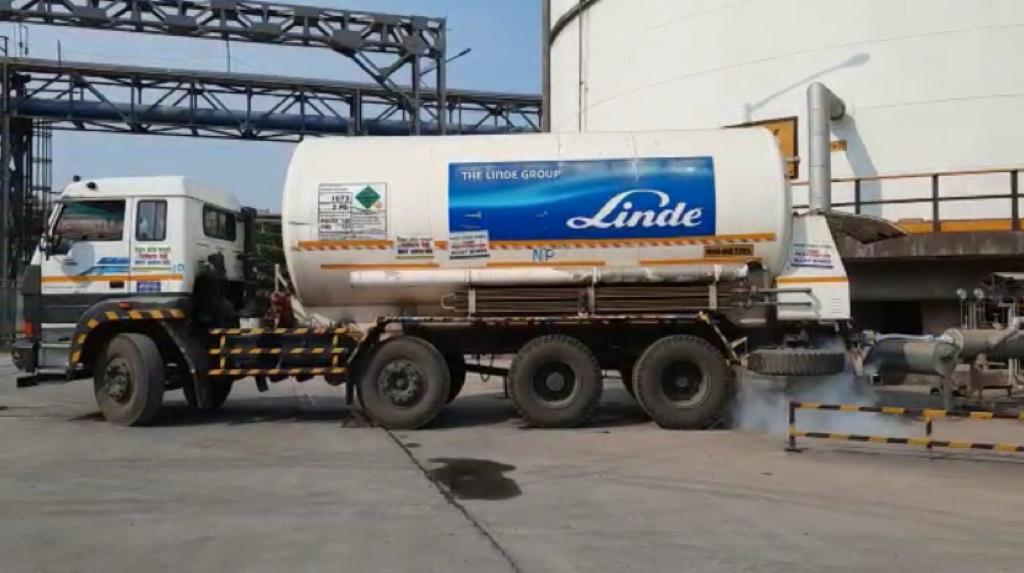
Linde plc's Tata Motors 1618 road tanker is being loaded with Liquid Medical Oxygen at Visakhapatnam Steel Plant, 22 April 2021

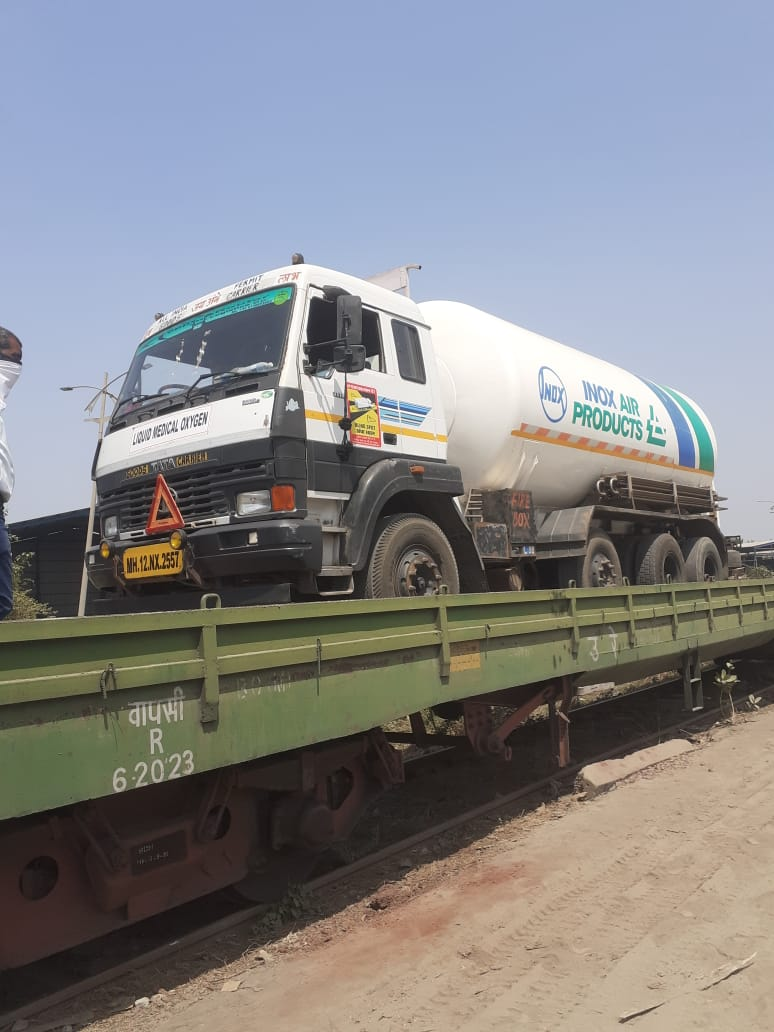
Empty LMO tankers of Inox Air Products departing from Kalamboli goods yard for the Visakhapatnam Steel Plant, 19 April 2021

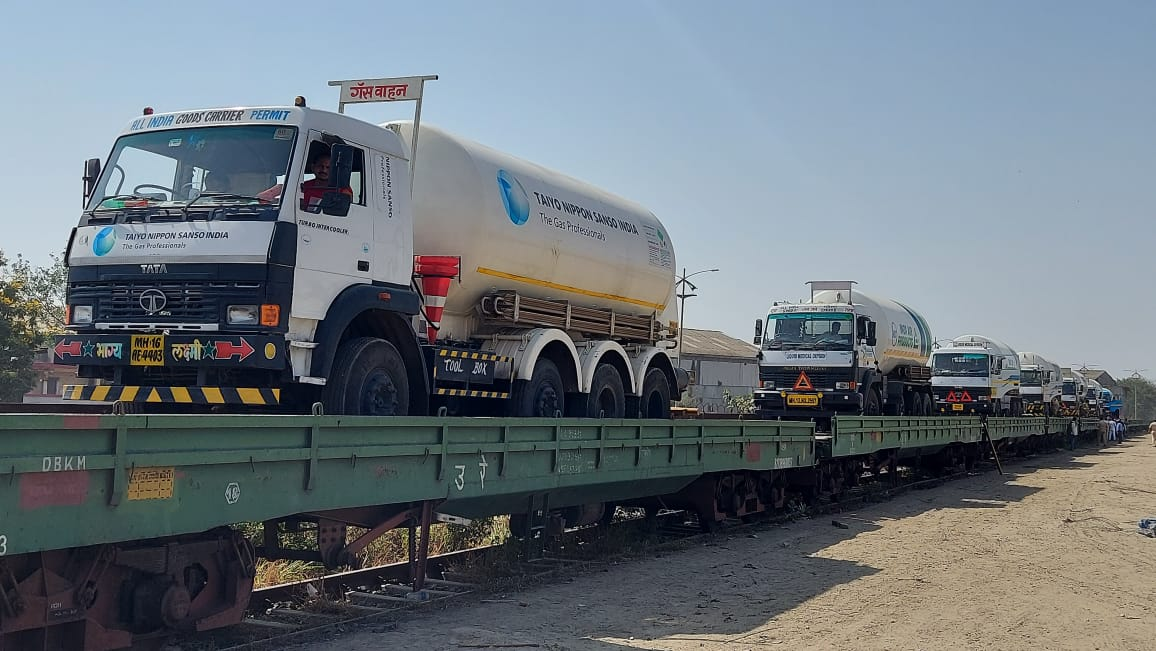
Taiyo Nippon Sanso's Empty LMO Tankers at Kalamboli, Maharastra, 19 April 2021
