= Indra (boat) =

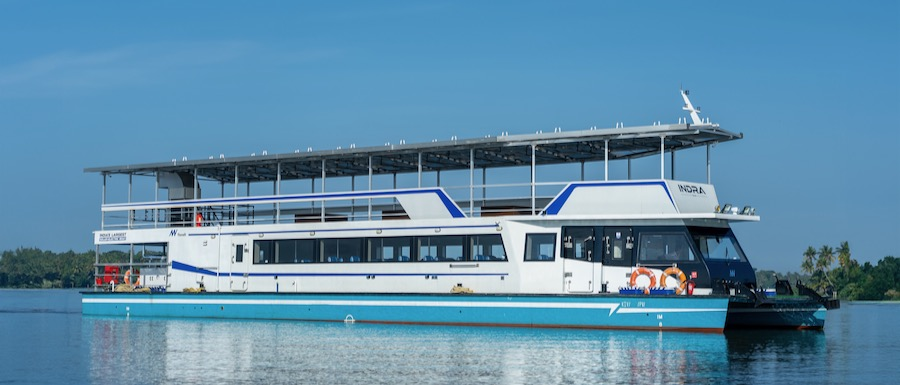

History

India
- Name: Indra
- Owner: Kerala State Water Transport Department
- Operator: Kerala State Water Transport Department
- Port of registry: Kodungallur
- Route: Kochi waters
- Builder: Navalt, Kochi, India
- Cost: ₹3.71 Crores
- Yard number: Y-19
- Launched: December 2023
- Completed: December 2023
- Maiden voyage: December 2023
- In service: December 2023
- Status: In service

General characteristics
- Class & type: Indian Register of Shipping IRS +IW ZONE 1, FERRY
- Type: Catamaran
- Displacement: 40 tonnes
- Length: 27 m
- Beam: 7 m
- Height: 6 m
- Draught: 1.0 m
- Depth: 1.8 m
- Decks: Double
- Installed power: 2 × 10 kW (cruise); 2 × 20 kW (max)
- Propulsion: 2 Permanent magnet asynchronous electrical motors – 20 kW each (max) @ 700 rpm
- Speed: 7 knots (13 km/h; 8.1 mph) (max); 6 knots (11 km/h; 6.9 mph) (cruising)
- Capacity: 100 passengers
- Crew: 3

Indra is the largest solar-powered boat in India. It started operations in Kochi waters in the Indian state of Kerala on 22 December 2023. The design and construction was done by Navalt at their Kochi headquarters and their Navgathi Panavally Yard.

== Statistics ==
Ever since the boat started operating, it has been a hit with the passengers.

== Technical features ==
The 27-metre-long and 7-metre-wide boat is covered by 125 square metres (1,350 sq ft) of solar panels rated at 25 kW, which in turn connect to two electric motors of 20 kW, one in each hull. There are 1500 kg of lithium-ion batteries in the ship's two hulls with a total capacity of 80 kWh. The catamaran hull and its shape allow it to reach speeds of up to 7 knots. This was verified by Indian Register of Shipping surveyor.

The boat is remotely monitored and troubleshooting can also be done remotely. All the operating parameters of the boat are recorded and transmitted to the Navalt's server from where the technical experts can monitor the boat. The upgrades and settings in the software can also be performed remotely as if a computer is plugged into the boat. This makes the boat even safer.

== Safety features ==
- The boat is a catamaran and hence more stable than single-hulled boats. Even with 50% more capacity, 150 passengers, the boat will meet all the criteria for stability.
- The propulsion battery is approved by DNV Class. These higher standards of safety are essential to ensure the risk of thermal runaway is minimal.
- Cell level monitoring of the battery ensures that risks are lower.
- There are three levels of safety warning for various parameters like temperature of cells, motor, and many more. Level one indicates certain parameters are approaching threshold limit. The next level is the warning that limits have reached and hence need a slowdown, and finally level three warning that limits have breached and the system need to shut down to protect it.
- There are two independent power train that provides reliability and redundancy. A system fault in one power train does not affect the other since they are electrically independent. The boat satisfies the Indian Register of Shipping's safety requirement of being able to maintain cruise speed with one set of propulsion shut down.
- There are two generators on board to take care of range anxiety – a three phase 30 kVA genset to power the auxiliary including air conditioners and a single phase 25 kVA genes to recharge the propulsion battery.

== See also ==
- Electric boat
- Solar Impulse, a solar powered airplane
- List of solar-powered boats
